= Washing mitt =

Cloth pouch for washing

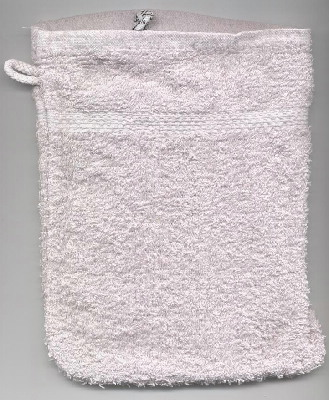
A washing mitt

A washing mitt or washglove is a piece of terry cloth shaped like a pouch that the hand fits in. It is used as a type of washcloth to aid in washing the body, for example, to apply soap to the body, and to remove the soap with a rinsed out washing mitt. Larger wash mitts are used for cleaning cars, boats, and other vehicles by hand.

== Bathing ==
A washing mitt is especially useful for people who like to wash themselves at a sink, and do not wish to spill or waste much water. An expansion on the washing mitt is the showercloth, with which also the back can be washed. There are also special sponges which can be used in the shower, or in the bathtub, in combination with a shower gel. Usually, a towel is used to dry off the body afterwards.

In the case of bruises or injuries, a washing mitt can be filled with ice, so that it can be used as an ice bag.

Washing mitts are mostly used in the Netherlands, Belgium, France, Germany, Iran and Korea. Wash cloths are commonly used in Korea both at home and within their public bathhouses.

Bathing mitts with a sewn-in piece of loofah were popular in the 1890s in the United States, as part of a trend of marketing skin care products to women; Ivory soap had been introduced in 1879.

=== Caregiving and adaptive use ===
A washing mitt may be used by nurses and caregivers to wash patients in their beds. Occupational therapists and nurses also teach patients with reduced hand strength or mobility to use washing mitts with soap pockets as a strategy for bathing oneself with reduced risk of dropping items, among other options such as soap on a rope.

Parents teaching children to wash themselves may provide a washing mitt with a bit of soap inside.

== Cleaning ==
Wash mitts made of different types of soft material are used to hand wash vehicles, such as cars and sailboats. A sheepskin wash mitt can be used to clean a tractor. Wash mitts are often used by people to clean their own vehicles, and professional auto detailers also use them as part of cleaning procedures.

== See also ==
- Italy towel – Exfoliating utensil mainly used in Korea
- Peshtemal – Traditional towel used in baths in Turkey
- Mitter curtain – Car wash component
