= Salux cloth =

Type of washcloth

Salux cloth, also called Salux nylon, is a type of Japanese washcloth originating in 1966, made of part nylon and polyester. The cloth is known for its ability to soften and smooth skin. Salux may also reduce ingrown hairs after shaving and help with exfoliation. Salux won the Japanese Invention Award in 1974.

== See also ==
- Disposable towel
- Peshtamal
- Terrycloth
