= Turkish towel =

Turkish towel can refer to two different things:

- a type of towel used in Turkish baths, such as a fouta towel or a peshtemal
- Chondracanthus exasperatus, a seaweed known as Turkish towel
