= Futa =

Futa may refer to:

== Geography ==
- Futa Pass in the Apennines, Italy
- Futa River, Chile
- Futa, Ghana, a community in Ghana
- Fouta Djallon, Guinea
- Futa Tooro, a region along the Senegal River
- Imamate of Futa Jallon
- Imamate of Futa Toro

== Acronyms ==
- Federal Unemployment Tax Act (US)
- Federal University of Technology Akure, Nigeria

== People ==
- André-Philippe Futa, Congolese politician
- Yasunosuke Futa, Japanese village chief and architect
- Futa Helu, Tongan philosopher, historian, and educator
- Futa Nakamura (born 1991), known as Ben-K, Japanese wrestler

== Other ==
- Fouta towel or futa towel, a piece of cloth worn in a skirt-like fashion in certain countries
- Futa (red panda), a famous standing Japanese red panda
- FUTA, an e-bike made by Ducati
- Futa, an abbreviation for futanari, the Japanese word for hermaphroditism and a genre of pornography
- FUTA, an bus line for Vietnam transportation

== See also ==
- Fouta (disambiguation)
