= Hydrocotton =

Cotton-growing technology company and fabric type

Hydrocotton is a company based in London, England working on cotton-growing technology using 80% less water than existing cultivation methods, without artificial fertilizers or pesticides. The company is also seeking to enable tracing the cotton from the grower to the ultimate user for a transparent supply chain.

The term hydrocotton is also used in an unrelated way to describe a cotton fabric used to make towels and bedlinen, using a weaving method creating many fine, untwisted yarn loops with an airy hollow core to promote absorbency.
