= Towel tablet =

Compressible towel

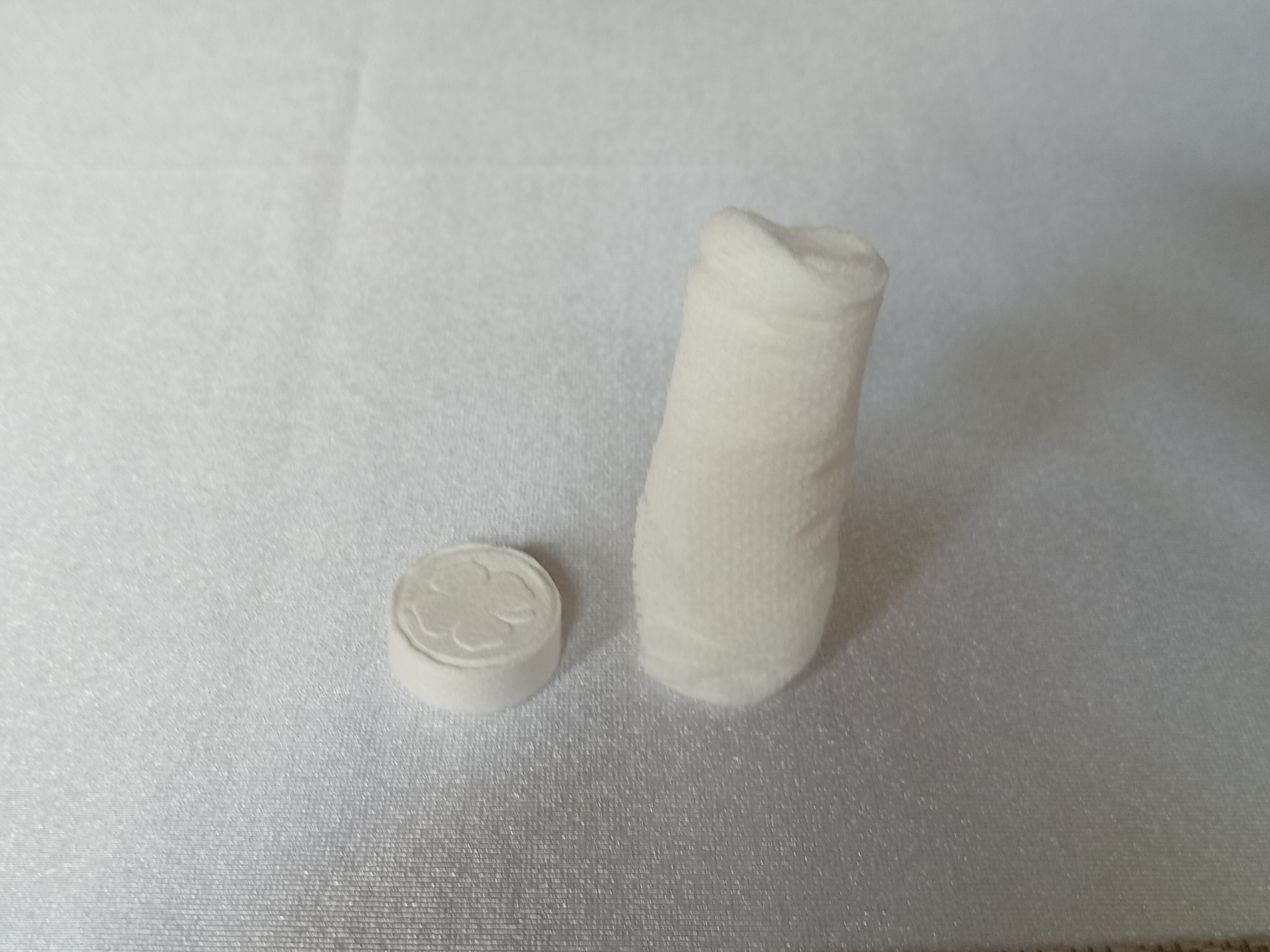
A towel tablet before and after being put in water.

A towel tablet is a fiber towel that is compressed into the shape and size of a small tablet. The towel tablet expands when water is added to the tablet. Typically the expanded towel size is approximately 26 cm by 20 cm (10" x 8"). Typical uses are for travel, large events, and other situations where these disposable hygiene towels are needed.

The compressed towel tablet is made from viscose rayon, which is a fiber of regenerated cellulose. It is a β-D-glucose polymer having the empirical formula (C_{6}H_{10}O_{5})_{n}.

Cellulose is structurally similar to cotton and is generally derived from various plants like soy, bamboo or sugarcane.

== See also ==
- Dopp kit
