= Flannel (disambiguation) =

Flannel is a woollen (or other) cloth.

Flannel may also refer to:

== Textiles ==
- Washcloth, known as a flannel in British English
- Flannels, cricket attire originally made of flannel
- Flannel vest

== Other uses ==
- Flannel, a networking component of CoreOS
- "Flannel", a 2018 song by Justin Timberlake from Man of the Woods
