= Griot's Garage =

Automotive care products company

- Type: Private
- Industry: Automotive; Car Care
- Founded: 1990; 36 years ago in San Diego, California, U.S.
- Founder: Richard Griot
- Headquarters: Tacoma, Washington
- Key people: Nick Griot, CEO
- Products: Vehicle cleaning, detailing, and maintenance products
- Website: www.griotsgarage.com

Griot's Garage (pronounced grē‑ō) is an American car care and detailing products company headquartered in Tacoma, Washington. The company manufactures and sells vehicle cleaning and maintenance products.

== History ==
Griot's Garage was founded in 1990 by Richard Griot in Southern California. Griot identified a gap in the American market for specialized car care products aimed at enthusiasts rather than professional detailers. The company began as a mail‑order business, distributing products through a printed catalog that included automotive commentary.

Early product offerings focused on car washing and basic detailing supplies, with the catalog format serving as the company's primary sales channel in its formative years. Over time, the catalog expanded in size and scope, introducing additional maintenance tools, polishes, and accessories.

The company later relocated its headquarters to Tacoma, Washington. As sales volume increased, Griot's Garage expanded its logistics network and established a major distribution facility in Plainfield, Indiana, located within the Indianapolis metropolitan area. The Plainfield site serves as a central warehouse and fulfillment hub supporting national distribution.

== Retail ==
Griot's Garage operates a flagship retail store and showroom location in Tacoma, Washington that includes an automotive collection display. The site incorporates rotating vehicle exhibits and serves as a venue for educational programming, including car care demonstrations, workshops, and other community-focused automotive events.
