= Eirakuya =

Company in Kyoto, Japan

EIRAKUYA Co. Ltd.
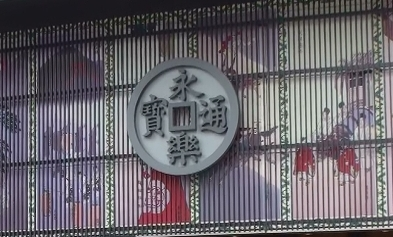
- Native name: 株式会社 永楽屋
- Industry: Production and retail of traditional Japanese tenugui.
- Founded: 1615 (established 1959)
- Headquarters: Nakagyō-ku, Kyoto, Japan
- Website: http://eirakuya.jp/

Eirakuya Co. Ltd. (株式会社 永楽屋 かぶしきがいしゃ えいらくや kabushiki-gaisha Eirakuya) is a Japanese manufacturer and vendor of tenugui (hand towels) located in the Nakagyō-ku ward of Kyoto, Japan. It was founded in 1615.

== History ==
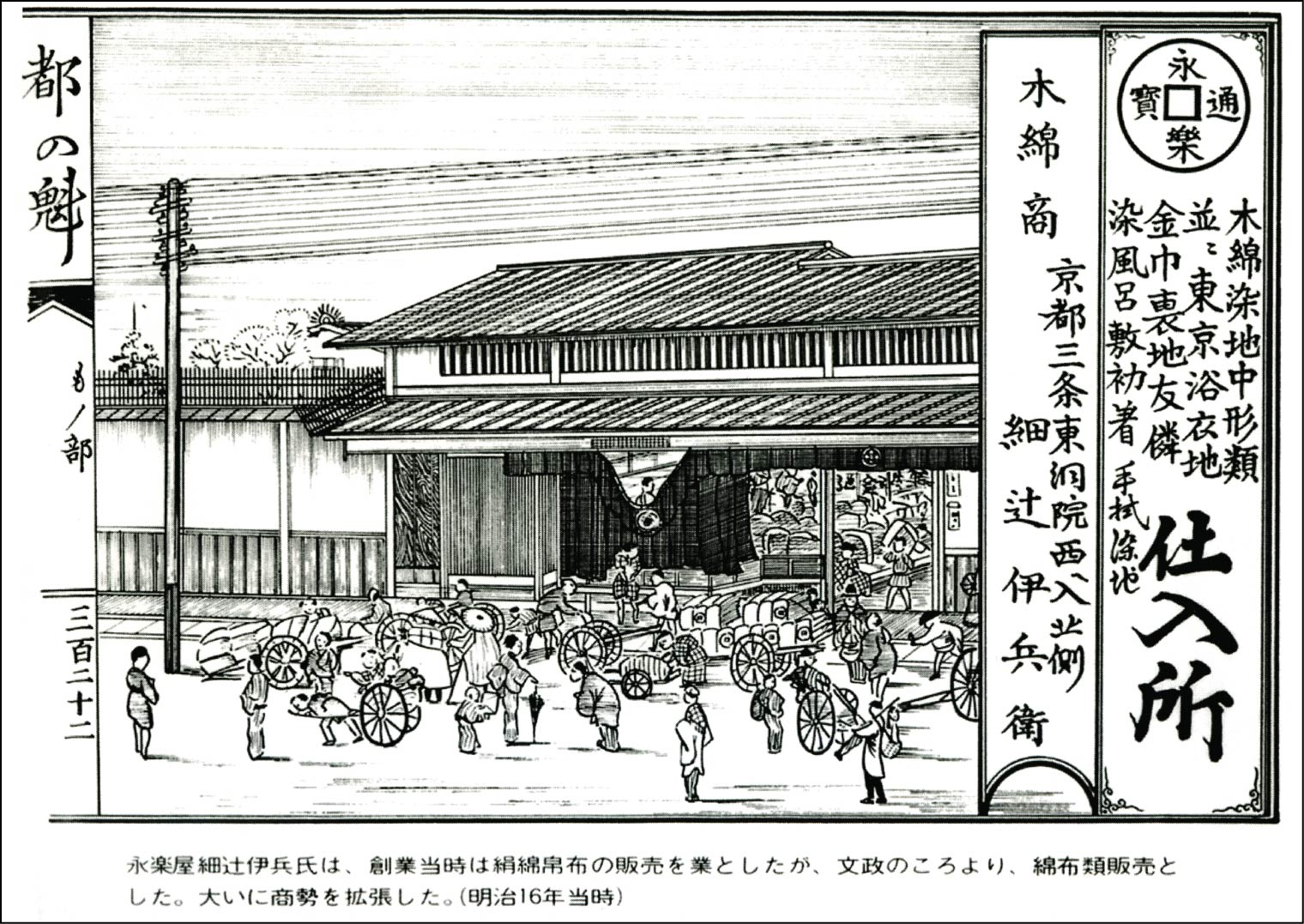
Eirakuya shop during the Meiji Era.

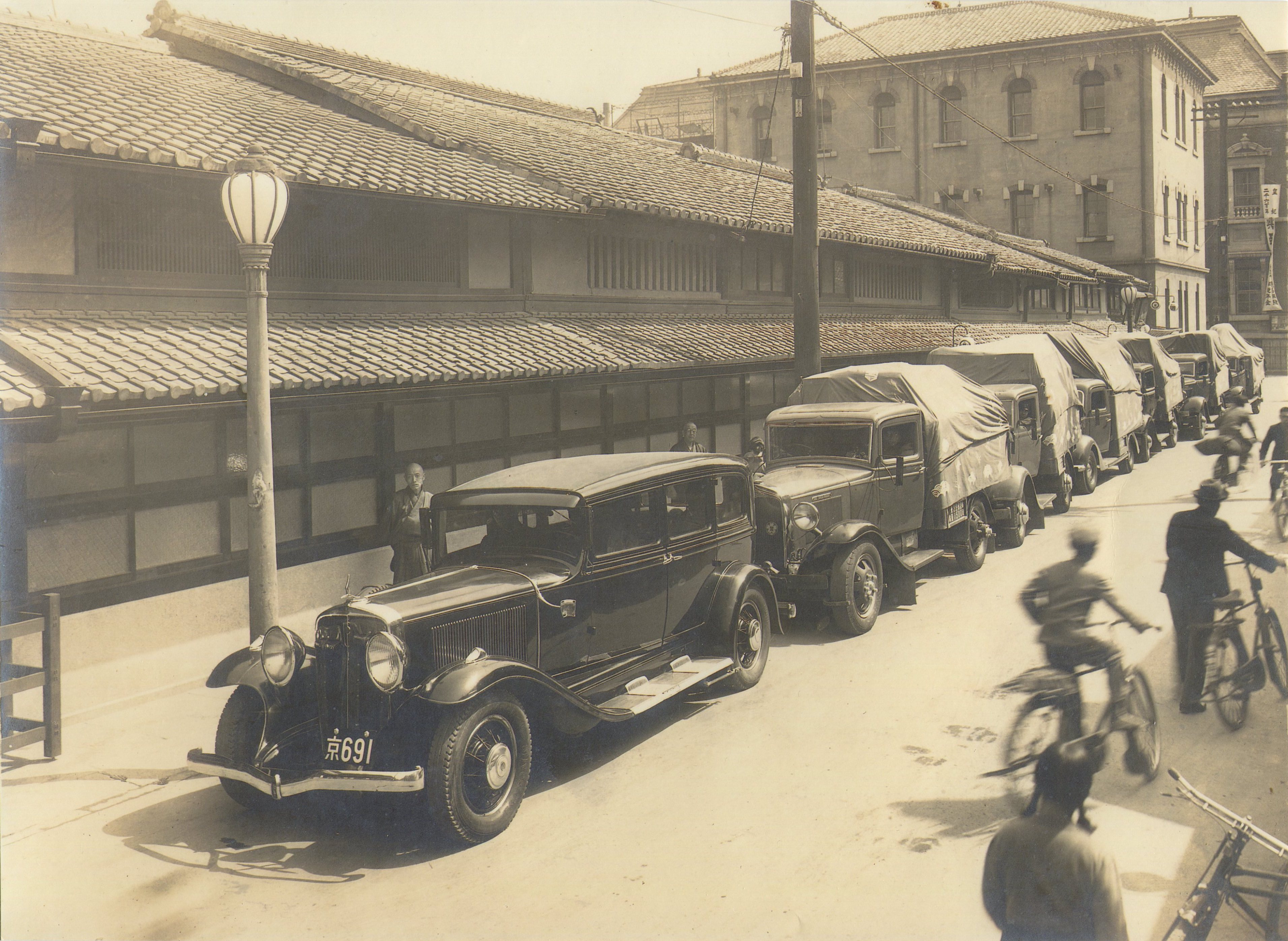
Eirakuya during the early Showa Period.

The company was founded in the year 1615 and is known as the oldest cotton cloth dealer of Japan. Before the Bakumatsu, the store of the business was lost in fires twice and was reconstructed in the early Meiji Period. However, during WWII the building was demolished as part of the firewall construction plans of the time.

After the war, the company was formally established in 1959, with focus in the production and selling of towels, facing strong competition from foreign brands. Later in 1999, the company shifted back to producing traditional tenugui and was able to achieve financial stability after a long period of crisis.

== Present day ==
The company continues to produce and sell tenugui, along with other items such as business card holders and bags. Currently it has 9 stores around Kyoto and 60 employees in total.

In recent years, as a brand, it has gained popularity among foreign visitors for offering items of both traditional and artistic design.
