= Car wash =

Facility used to clean the exterior of motor vehicles

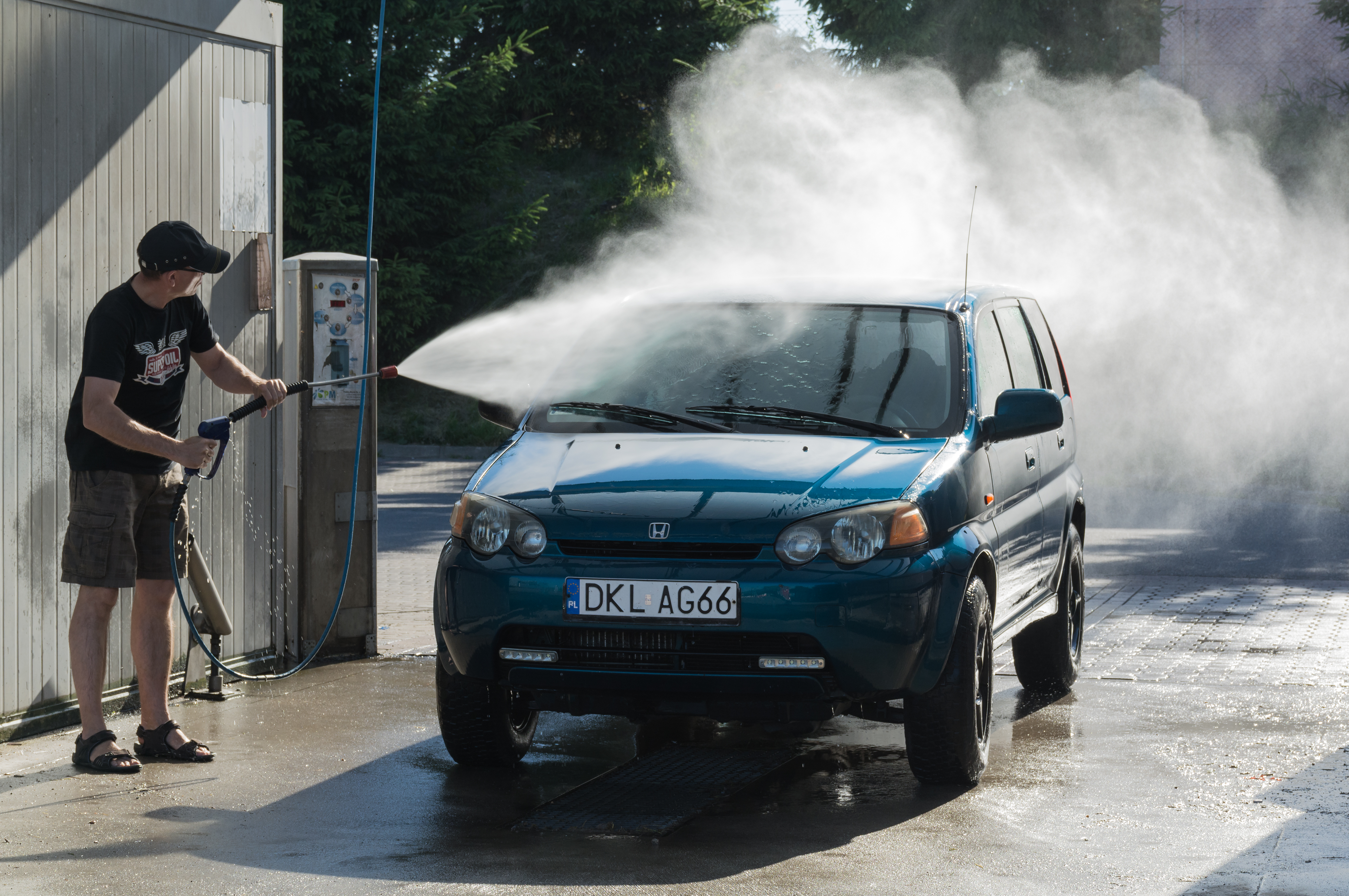
A self-service car wash in Kłodzko, Poland

A car wash, or auto wash, is a facility used to clean the exterior, and in some cases the interior, of cars. Car washes can be self-service, full-service (with attendants who wash the vehicle), or fully automated (possibly connected to a filling station). Car washes may also be events where people pay to have their cars washed by volunteers, often using less specialized equipment, as a fundraiser.

== History ==
The first U.S. patent for a mechanized car wash was filed in 1900 and soon followed by "auto laundries". The Automobile Laundry in Detroit, Michigan, opened in 1914 by Frank McCormick and J.W. Hinkle, is considered the first business in the U.S. to adopt the name "car wash" for their services. Manual car wash operations, which used manpower to push or move the cars through stages, peaked at 32 drive-through facilities in the United States. The first semi-automatic car wash in the United States debuted in 1946 at a facility in Detroit, which used automatic pulley systems and manual brushing.

Dan Hanna, encouraged by car washers in Detroit, founded a car wash in 1967 called the Rub-a-Dub in Oregon. He later formed Hanna Enterprises and reached about 31 locations. Hanna operated his wash rack until adopting a mechanized car washing system in 1959. The company became one of the leading manufacturers of car washing equipment and materials, including brushes, conveyor belts, tire washes, and recirculating water systems. In the late-1960's, some car washes began to adopt "flex-serve" models to accommodate customers who did not want a full interior and exterior cleaning, in which facilities such as vacuuming and hand detailing are constructed near the exit as an optional service.

The car wash industry in the U.S. remained primarily led by small businesses that distinguished themselves through playful signage or building architecture. At the turn of the 21st century, the "express exterior" business model—first developed by a chain in Baton Rouge, Louisiana—began to emerge, in which computerized point of sale and queueing systems are used to manage customer throughput via automation, reducing the amount of staff required. In the 2010s, this model began to be combined with subscription-based car wash services, which offer convenience and potentially lower costs for car owners compared to traditional pay-per-wash models.

Due to their turnkey nature and lower staffing requirements, express exterior washes became an ubiquitous business model for the industry, resulting in many operators and private equity firms investing in opening larger chains of locations. As of 2024, the United States is estimated to have approximately 60,000 car washes that constitute a $14 billion industry. It experienced annual growth of approximately 5% per year in the early 2020s, which some market analysts attributed to subscription-based services. Additionally, the market share of professional car washes (versus at-home car washes) has grown significantly, from 50% in 1996 to an estimated 79% in 2021. Some municipalities in the United States have enacted saturation bans due to the number of new car wash locations being constructed in clusters.

== Categories ==
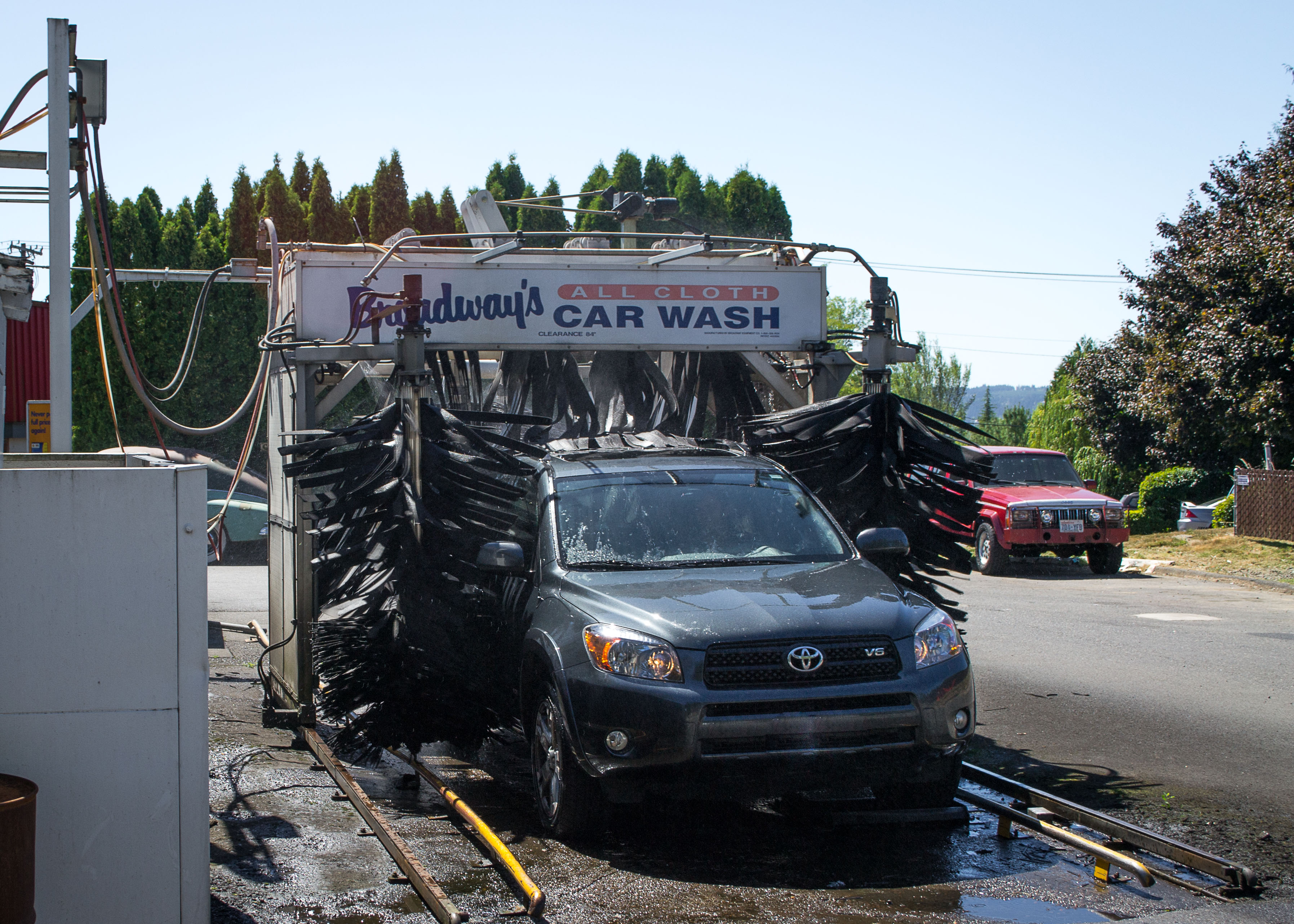
An in-bay automatic car wash performing a friction wash pass

The following are forms of car washing.

- Hand car wash Vehicles are cleaned manually by attendants using cloths, brushes, and buckets or hoses. These facilities may offer basic exterior washing or full detailing services, including interior cleaning.
- Self-service facilities, generally coin-operated, where the customer manually washes the car with a water-dispersing wand and low-pressure brushes, including pressurized "jet washing".
- In-bay automatics involve the customer parking and an automatic wash machine rolling back and forth over the stationary vehicle. Housed at filling stations and stand-alone wash sites.
- Conveyor or tunnel washes involve the car moving on a conveyor belt through a series of fixed cleaning mechanisms while the customer waits outside. Friction (brushes or curtains) or frictionless (high-pressure nozzles and touchless wash) are used.
- Mobile car washes Operators travel to the customer's location with equipment mounted on vans, trailers, or trucks. Services may include exterior washing, waxing, and interior cleaning. Many operators use water tanks, pressure washers, generators, vacuums, and buffers.
- Car wash lift systems, where cars are placed on a lift platform that can be used to wash under the car.
- Touch-free (or touchless) car washing technology is the modern car wash system that reduces water consumption, chemical solutions, and time. Washing machinery uses high-pressure jets that measure the length and width of the vehicle.
- Steam car wash: Steam cleaning uses high-temperature steam to remove dirt and grime from both the exterior and interior surfaces. This method is water-efficient and often used for sanitization purposes.
- Waterless car wash: This technique uses high-lubricity cleaning agents and microfiber cloths to clean the vehicle without the need for rinsing with water. It is favored in areas with water restrictions or where mobility is prioritized.

=== Use of chemicals ===
In modern car wash facilities, whether tunnel, in-bay automatic, or self-serve, detergents and other cleaning solutions are designed to loosen and eliminate dirt and grime. This is in contrast to earlier times, when hydrofluoric acid, a hazardous chemical, was commonly used as a cleaning agent in the industry by some operators. There has been a move in the industry to shift to safer cleaning solutions. Most car wash facilities are legally required to treat and/or reuse their water and may be required to maintain wastewater discharge permits. This is in contrast to unregulated facilities or even driveway washing (at one's home), where wastewater can end up in the storm drain and, eventually, in streams, rivers, and lakes.

A chemical car wash, or waterless car wash, uses chemicals to wash and polish car surfaces. This method is claimed to be eco-friendly, but is recommended only for cars with light dirt accumulation to avoid paint damage.

Mechanized car washes, especially those with brushes, may risk damaging the exterior finish. Paint finishes and car washing processes have improved. More facilities utilize "brushless" (cloth) and "touch-free" (high-pressure water) equipment, as well as modern "foam" washing wheels made of closed-cell foam.

== Self-serve car wash ==
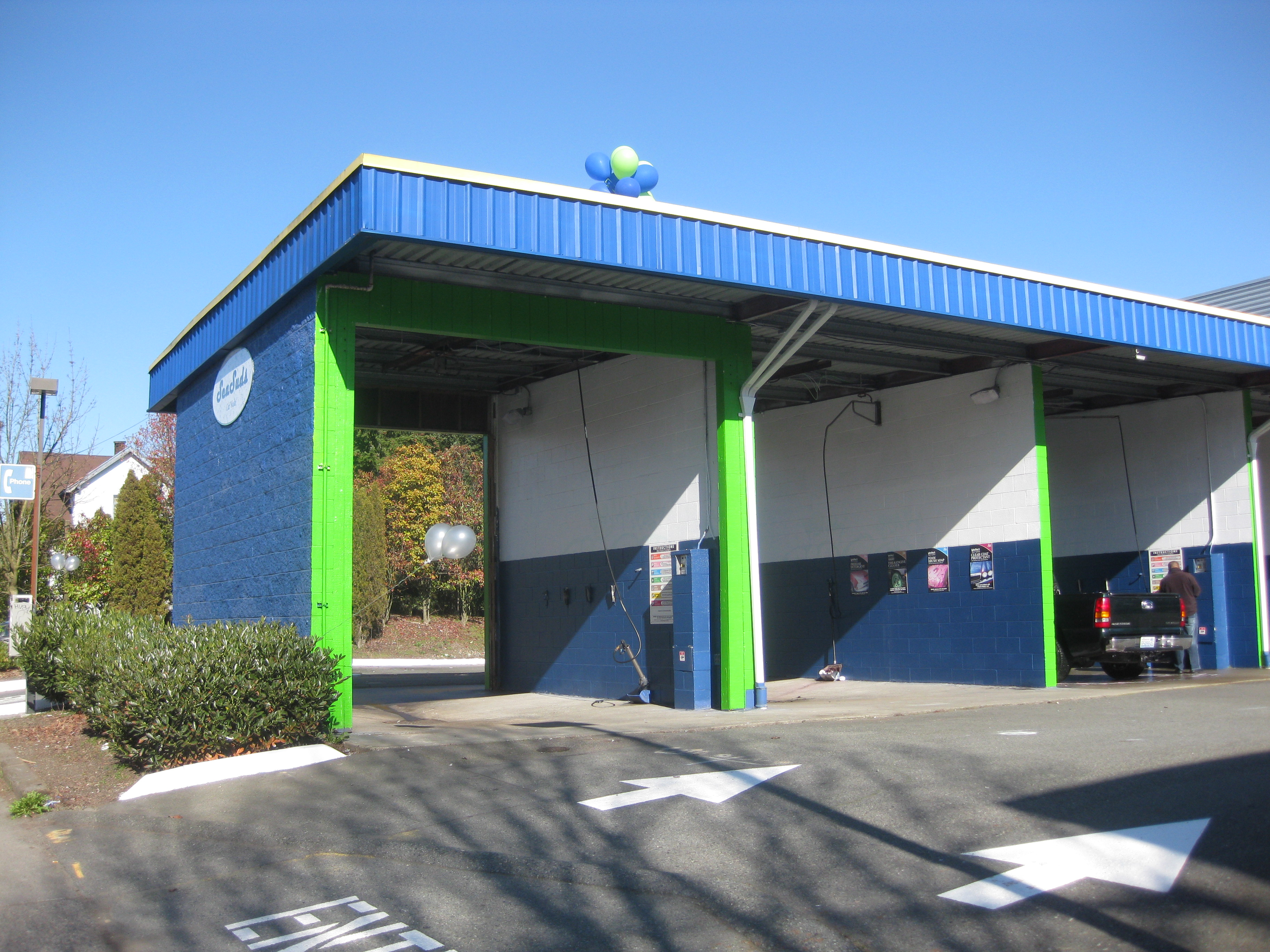
A multi-bay, coin-operated self-service car wash in Seattle, Washington

A self-serve car wash is a simple and automated type of car wash that is typically coin-operated or token-operated self-service system. Newer self-service car washes offer the ability to pay with credit cards or loyalty cards. The vehicle is parked inside a large, sometimes covered, bay equipped with a trigger gun and wand (a high-pressure sprayer) and a foam brush for scrubbing. When a customer inserts coins or tokens into the coin box, they can choose options such as soap, tire cleaner, wax, or clear water rinse, all dispensed from the sprayer, or scrub the vehicle with the foam brush. The number of coins or tokens inserted determines when customers operate the equipment; in most instances, a minimum number of coins is necessary to start the equipment. These facilities are often equipped with separate vacuum stations that allow customers to clean the upholstery and rugs inside their cars. Some self-service car washes offer hand-held dryers.

While self-service car washes offer flexibility and cost savings, they can also present challenges. In colder climates, water runoff can freeze in and around the bay, creating potential safety hazards. Moreover, self-serve vacuum stations may harbor various bacteria, including Staphylococcus aureus, Pseudomonas aeruginosa, Listeria monocytogenes, and coliforms such as Escherichia coli. These microorganisms can pose health risks, particularly to individuals with compromised immune systems, and may lead to the transfer of contaminants onto vehicle interiors during cleaning.

== Automatic car wash ==
=== Conveyor-driven/tunnel car wash ===
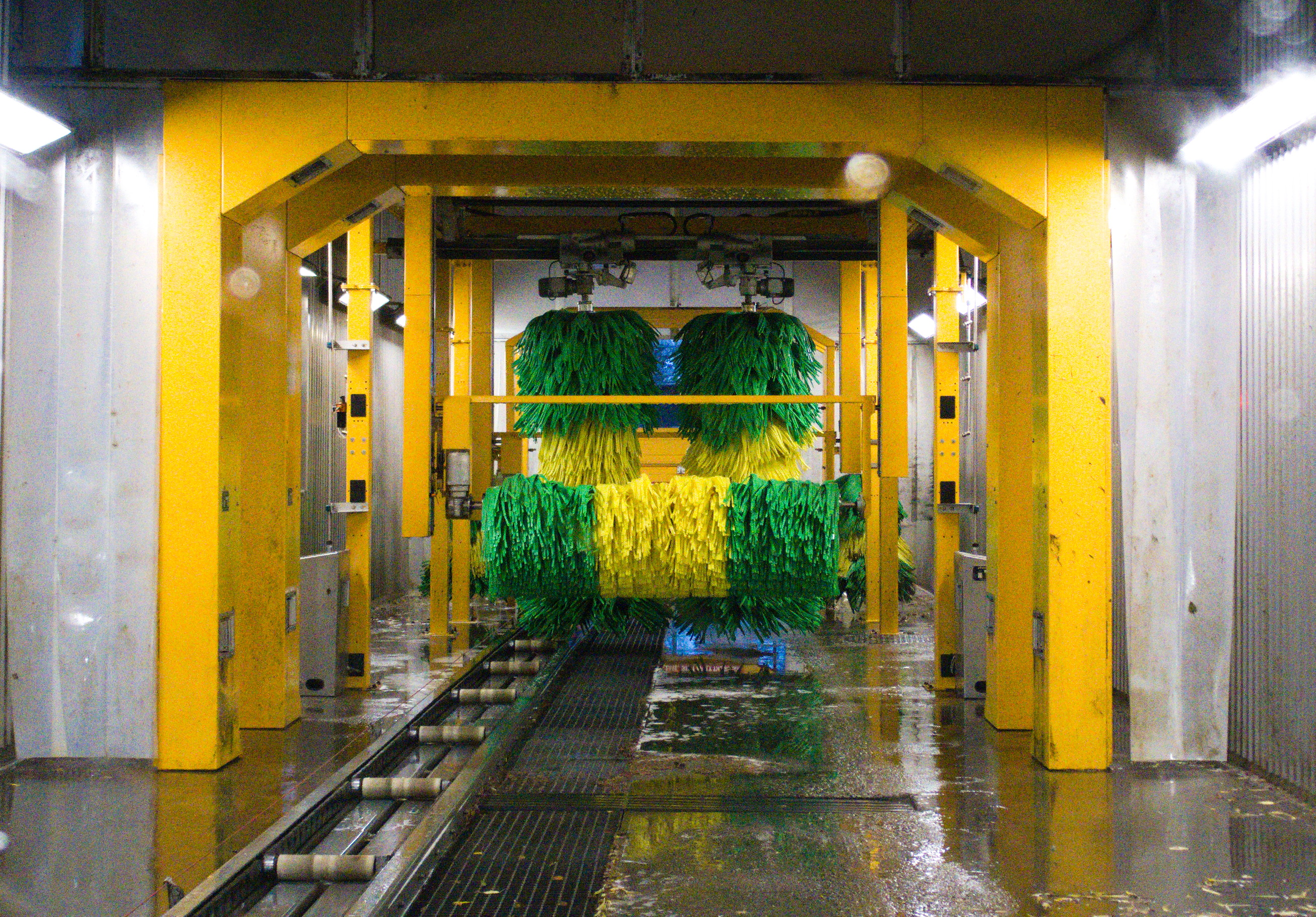
Car wash tunnel at the ABC filling station in Joensuu, Finland

The first conveyor-driven automatic car wash appeared in Hollywood, California, in 1940, and the oldest operating example survives in Washington, DC. Conveyor-driven automatic car washes consist of tunnel-like buildings into which customers (or attendants) drive.

Before entering the automated section of the wash tunnel, attendants may prewash customers' cars.

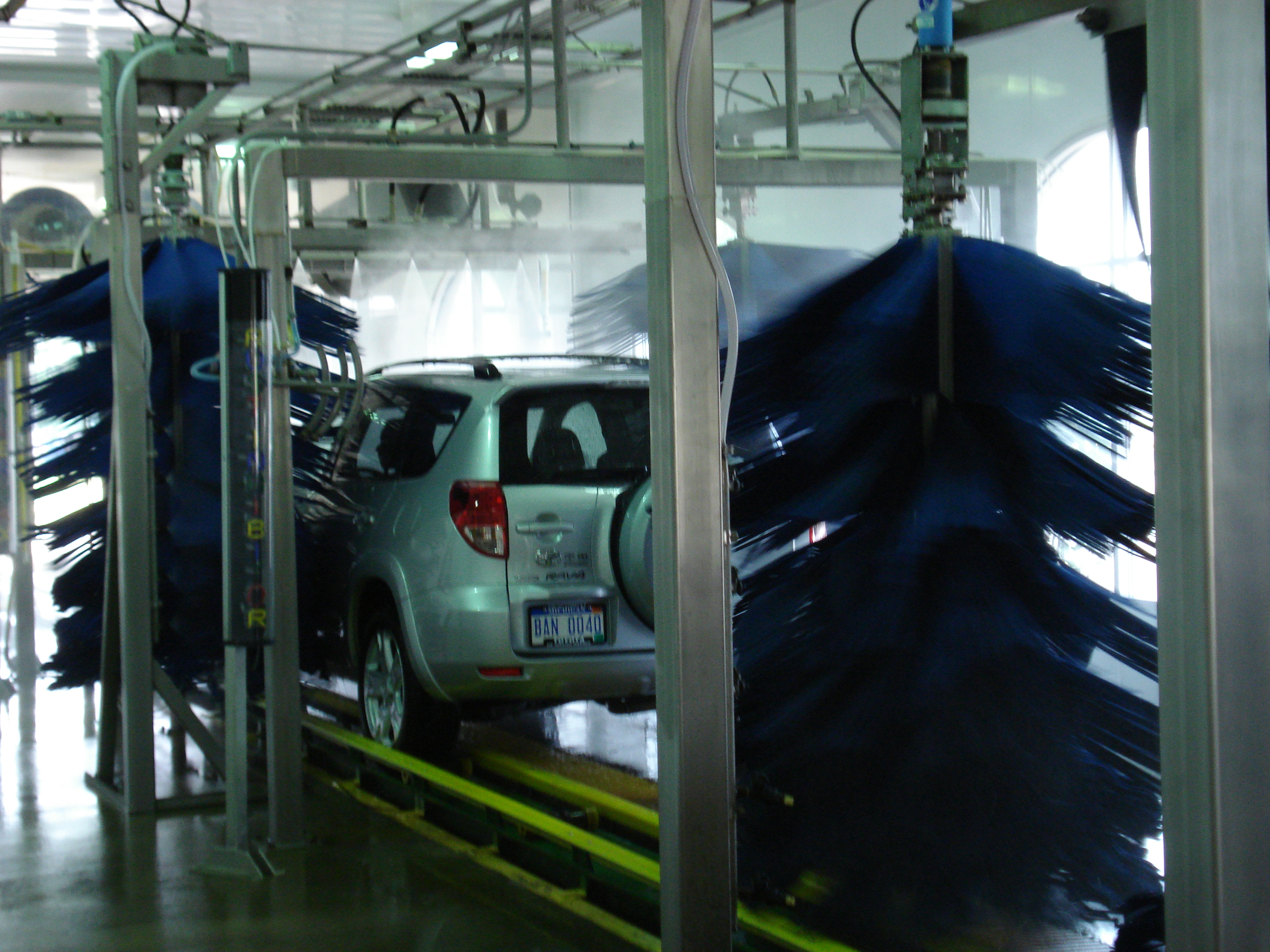
A vehicle exiting the friction zone of the wash. Visible are side brushes, wrap-around brushes, the conveyor, and a high-pressure rinse arch.

The car wash typically starts cleaning with chemicals called presoaks applied through special arches. CTAs, or "chemical tire applicators", apply specialized formulations, which remove brake dust and build-up from the surface of the wheels and tires.

A high-pressure arch may direct water at the vehicle's surface at the end of a car wash's presoak.

A typical "tunnel" touchless car wash viewed from the inside of a vehicle

Mitters are ribbon-like components that suspend cloth strips or sheets over the tunnel

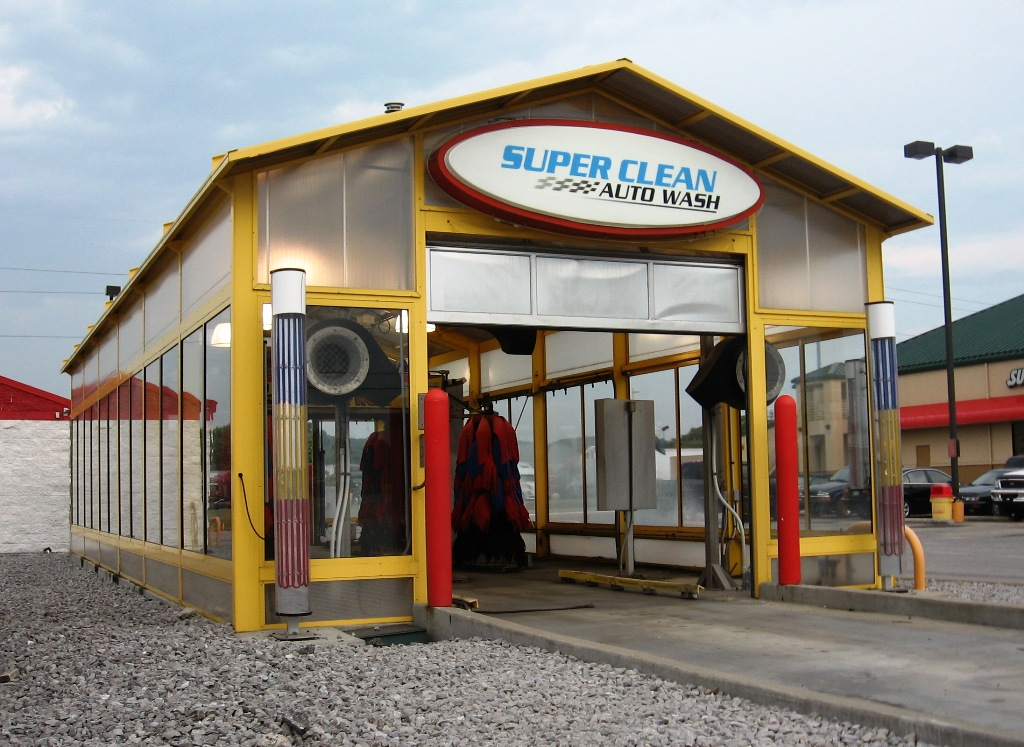
A glass car wash building containing an in-bay automatic and freestanding blowers

The car is rinsed with fresh water immediately, followed by extra services if required. In many car washes, the first of these services is a polish wax. After the polish, the wax application is typically a retractable mitter or top brush and, in some cases, side brushes or wrap-around brushes. Next is a protectant, which creates a thin protective film over a vehicle's surface. Protectants generally repel water, which assists in drying the car and aiding in the driver's ability to see through their windshield during rain. A low-end wax or clear coat protectant follows the primary protectant. A drying agent is typically applied at the end of the tunnel to remove water from the vehicle's surface before forced air drying. After the drying agent, there may be a "spot-free" rinse of soft water that has been filtered of the salts usually present and sent through semi-permeable membranes to produce highly purified water that will not leave spots.

Dryers may be present in various forms, such as stationary gantries with a contouring roof jet or small circular assemblies with nozzles of different shapes and sizes mounted on arches. Mitters, side brushes, top brushes, and/or wraps outfitted with chamois- or microfiber-based material may follow the dryers.

At "full-service" car washes, the car's exterior is washed mechanically, by hand, or using a combination of both, with attendants available to dry the vehicle manually and clean the interior. Many full-service car washes also provide "detailing" services, which may include polishing and waxing the car's exterior by hand or machine, shampooing, and steaming interiors as well as other services to provide thorough cleaning and protection to the car.

=== Touchless wash ===
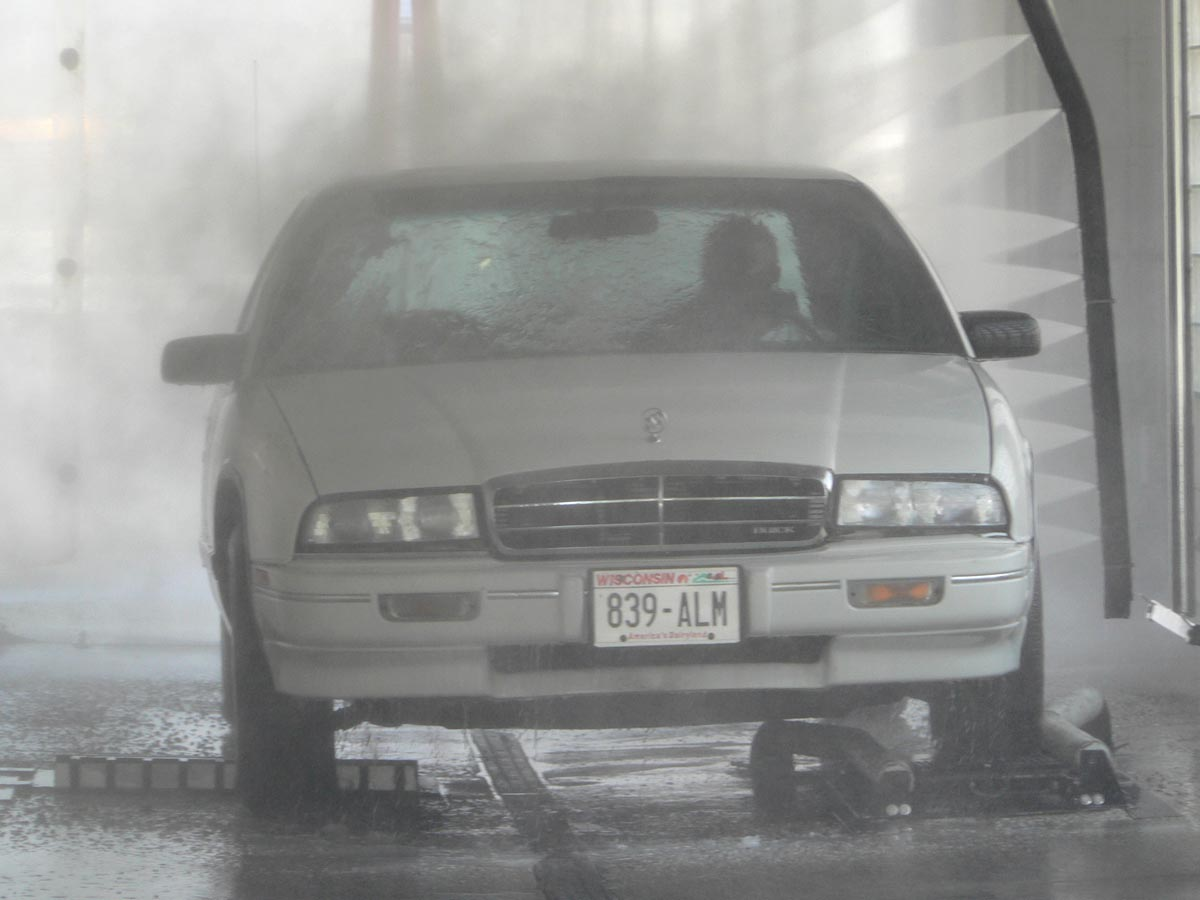
A touchless in-bay automatic car wash

Like soft-touch car washes, touchless car washes are automated, operating primarily as in-bay automatics. Instead of foam or cloth applicators, they rely on high-pressure washers to clean and rinse the vehicle. Newer machines typically include sensors that can detect the shape and contour of a vehicle, allowing for more precise cleaning and reduced water usage.

To compensate for not physically contacting the vehicle, touchless washes use higher pressures and more caustic detergents than ordinary car washes. Because the vehicle is not physically touched during a touchless wash, the vehicle is at a lower risk of being damaged. However, touchless washes have a harder time cleaning off tougher materials or reaching difficult-to-reach locations on vehicles, and their usage of stronger chemicals can potentially damage a vehicle's paint finish.

There has been increasing experimentation with the use of industrial robots for touchless washes instead of the traditional gantry-based approach, allowing for greater flexibility (including the use of advanced computer vision to generate precise paths for the sprayers) in comparison to traditional designs.

== Environmental factors ==
The primary environmental considerations for car washing are:

- Use of water and energy resources;
- Contamination of surface waters;
- Contamination of soil and groundwater.

The use of water supplies and energy is self-evident since car washes are users of such resources. The professional car wash industry has made strides in reducing its environmental footprint, a trend that will continue accelerating due to regulation and consumer demand. Many car washes use water reclamation systems to significantly reduce water usage and a variety of energy usage reduction technologies. These systems may be mandatory where water restrictions are in place.

Contamination of surface waters may arise from the rinse discharging to storm drains, which eventually drain to rivers and lakes. Chief pollutants in such wash-water include phosphates; oil and grease; and lead. This is almost exclusively an issue for home/driveway washing and parking lot-style charity washes. Professional carwashing is a point source of discharge that can capture these contaminants, generally in interceptor drains, so the contaminants can be removed before the water enters sanitary systems. (Water and contaminants that enter stormwater drains are not treated and released directly into rivers, lakes, and streams.)

Soil contamination is sometimes related to such surface runoff and is associated with soil contamination from underground fuel tanks or auto servicing operations which commonly are ancillary uses of car wash sites—but not an issue for car washing.

For these reasons, countries like Switzerland and Germany have banned citizens from washing their cars at home. In the US, some state and local environmental groups (the most notable being the New Jersey Department of Environmental Protection) have begun campaigns to encourage consumers to use professional car washes as opposed to driveway washing, including moving charity car wash fundraisers from parking lots to professional car washes. Poland, Portugal, Italy, and many other countries have no regulations regarding wastewater from car washing.

== See also ==
- Auto detailing
- Automobile repair shop
- Car costs
- Jetwash
- LaserWash, a brand of touchless in-bay automatic car wash
