= Fouta =

Fouta may refer to:

- Fouta Djallon, a highland region in the centre of Guinea
- Fouta towel, a piece of thin patterned fabric used in many Mediterranean countries
- Fouta Toro, a region along the border of Senegal and Mauritania

== See also ==
- Futa (disambiguation)
- Foutanké (horse)
