= Kitchen towel =

Kitchen towel can refer to:

- Dishtowel in North American English, called dishcloth or dishrag in UK English
- Paper towel in UK English
- Tea towel
