= Dry wash =

Dry wash may refer to:

- Waterless car wash, a technique used to wash a vehicle without the use of water
- Dry cleaning, any cleaning process for clothing and textiles using an organic solvent rather than water
- Arroyo (creek), wadi, or similar dry waterways
