= Italy towel =

Exfoliating utensil mainly used in Korea

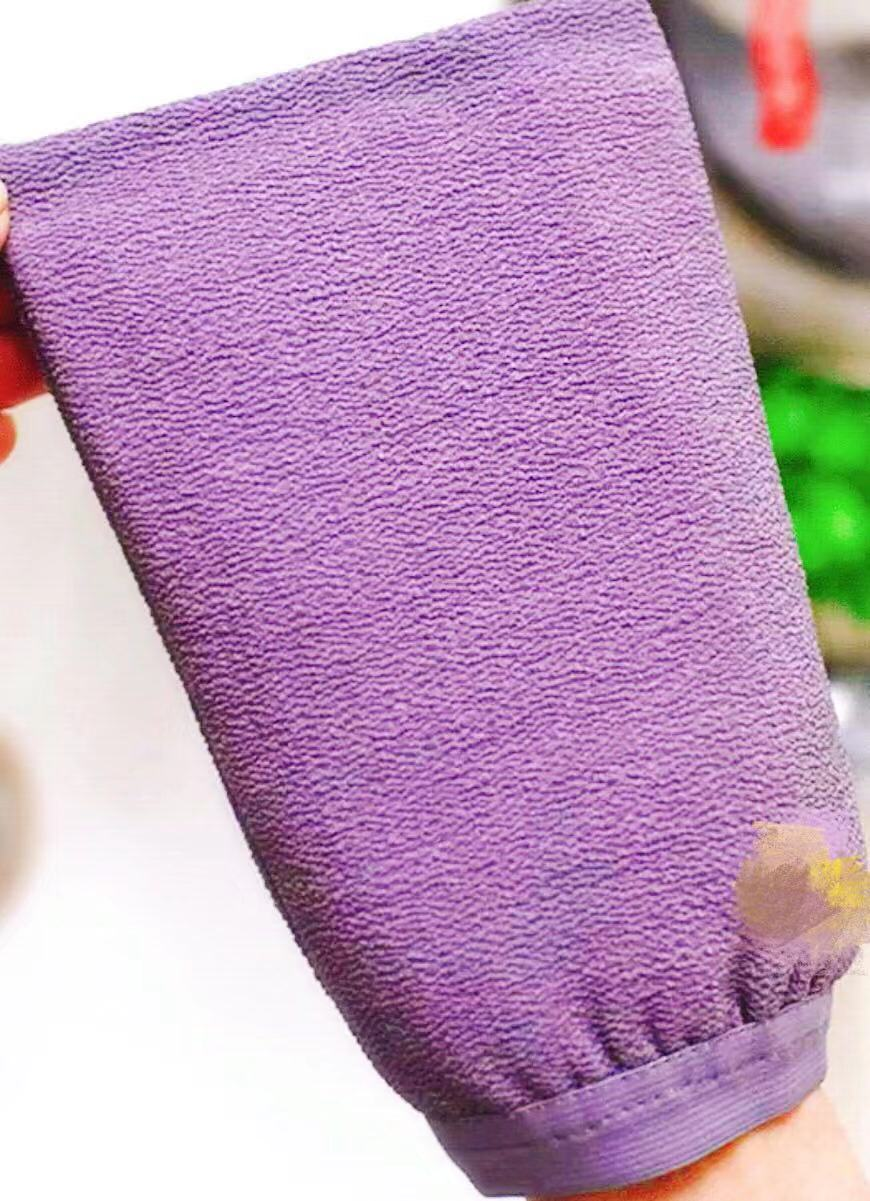
An exfoliating mitt

The Italy towel, (Korean: 이태리 타올) also known as the Korean exfoliating mitt or Korean exfoliating towel (depending on the shape), is a mass-produced bath product used to scrub and peel the outermost layer of skin; it was invented in Busan by Kim Won-jo (CEO of Hanil Textile) in 1967. Since then, the Italy towel has become a household item in Korean homes and a staple item in Korean saunas. The Italy towel is also used in other areas of Asia such as Thailand, the north of China, Central Asia and Japan.

The Korean exfoliating mitt was named the Italy towel because the viscose fabric used to make it was imported from Italy at the time. Different colors represent different strengths, with green being the standard.

According to a 2017 poll held by the Korean Intellectual Property Office, the Italy towel was ranked as one of the top ten inventions made within the country.

== Materials ==
There are different types of Italy towels, with most towels typically made of two squares that are sewn together and fit snugly over the hand. The towels are made of various coarse materials such as viscose rayon, sisal hemp, and nylon. The color of the Italy towel represents the item's strength, with pink and blue representing the softest and most coarse respectively. Green is used to designate the standard coarseness and is the most common type used.

== Use ==
The coarse surface of the Italy towels is meant to help users exfoliate skin more effectively by using a scrubbing motion over the body. Vogue writer Monica Kim has recommended that the towels be used after several minutes of soaking or exposing the skin in water to soften the skin and to use a soothing soap.

Korean scrub staff, or ttaemiri, recommend to only use the Italy towel once a week to avoid skin damage.

== See also ==
- Washcloth
- Washing mitt
