= Chamois leather =

Type of porous leather

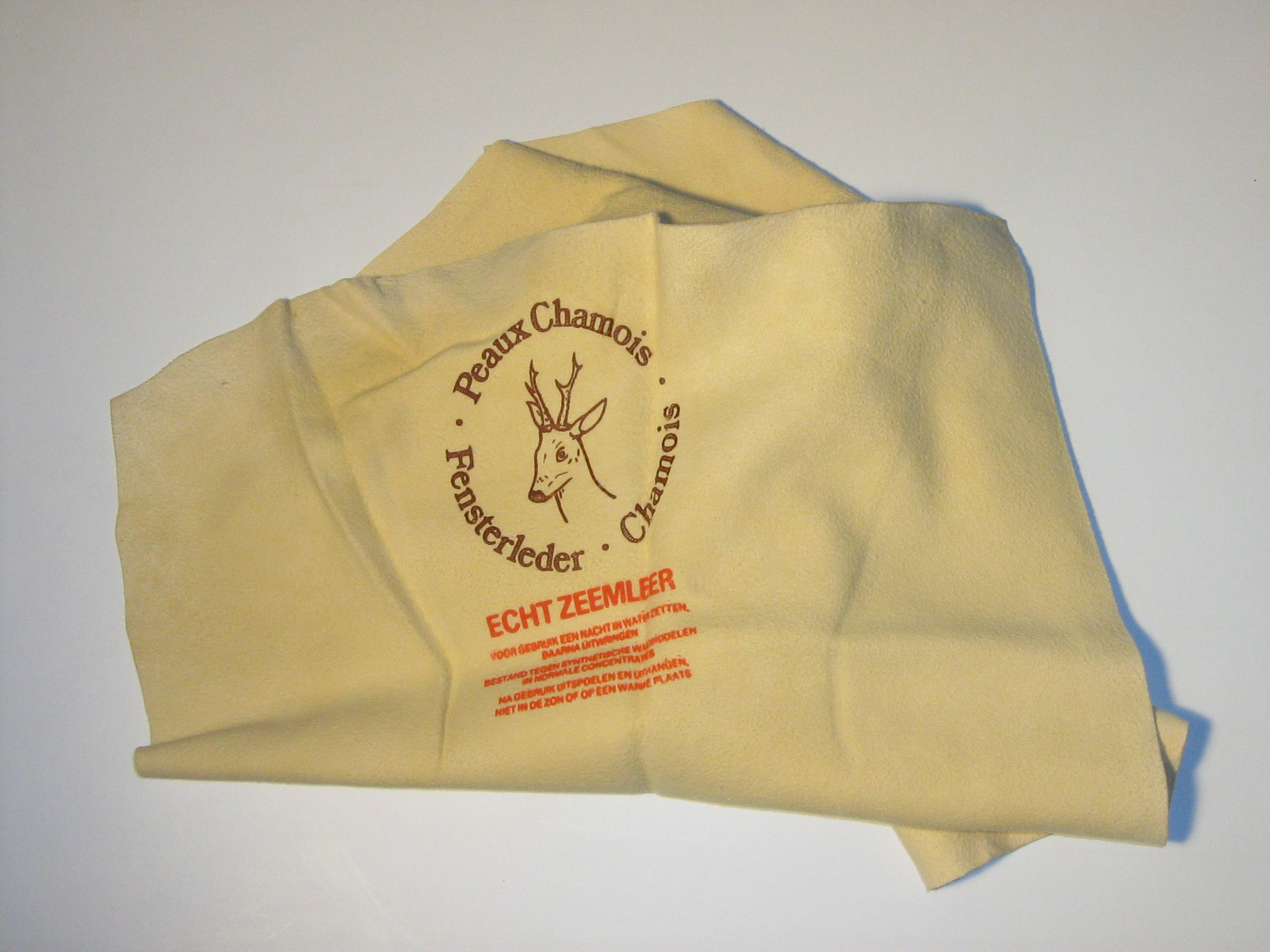
Chamois leather cloth depicting a deer's head

Chamois leather (/ˈʃæmi/) is a type of porous leather, traditionally the skin of the chamois (Rupicapra rupicapra), a type of European mountain goat, but today made almost exclusively from the flesh split of a sheepskin.

== United Kingdom ==
The British Standard BS 6715: 1991 defines chamois leather as:

Leather made from the flesh split of sheepskin or lambskin, or from sheepskin or lambskin from which the grain (the top split) has been removed by frizing, and tanned by processes involving oxidation of marine oils in the skin.

== United States ==
In the United States, the term chamois without any qualification is restricted to the flesh split of the sheep or lambskin tanned solely with oils (US Federal Standard CS99-1970).

Chamois leather is often counterfeited with goat or pig skin, the practice of which is a particular profession called by the French chamoiser.

== History ==
The term chamois as used to refer to specially-prepared leather originated sometime before 1709, referring to the prepared skin of any goat-like animal, historically the European antelope—commonly called the "chamois"—and exclusively used by the glovemaking industry of southwest France. It was discovered that when tanned in the local cod oil of nearby Biarritz, the result was a material of unprecedented absorbency. This leather was fashioned into soft white gloves designed for carriage footmen, who were responsible for the care and polishing of carriages. This industry usage later transferred to the chauffeurs of the "horseless carriages" invented in the early 1900s. The popularity of chamois leather greatly increased with the advent of mass-produced automobile windshields, which needed to be washed frequently for visibility purposes, but were inconvenient and time-consuming to dry through alternative means.

== Properties ==
Genuine chamois leather has almost no abrasive properties, and can be used as a very absorbent drying material for any automobile surface. This has made it a popular product for car cleaning and drying.

The elasticity of the skin's pores, which are very close together, also allow it to be used in micro-filtration. Its water absorbency and low friction make it good for other uses, such as in cycling shorts (although most modern cycling shorts now use synthetic "chamois" leather). It was also used in purifying mercury, which is done by passing it through the pores of the skin.

Chamois was historically used as a gasoline filter. When soaked with clean gasoline, chamois will not allow water to pass through its surface fibers. This property is used to filter fuel that has been stored in drums prone to ingress of water, or from any other doubtful source. The technique is to provide a large-mouthed funnel with a wide outlet surface that supports a woven wire base, or metal plate with a grid of holes. The lower part of the funnel is tapered to fit the receptacle or tank-filler aperture.

A suitably sized chamois skin is soaked in clean fuel and placed over the grid in the funnel and brought up the sides, forming a bowl, to prevent any leakage past the skin. Fuel can then be pumped into the top of the funnel by the fuel dispenser and watched for signs of water accumulation. The process can be stopped to lift out the assembly from the tank and the trapped water removed so that the job can be continued. Chamois leather is used thus as a fuel filter by boaters, auto detailers, and aircraft refuelers, particularly of a past age when aircraft were flown into very remote areas.

== Uses ==
Chamois leather is widely used for drying and buffing vehicles after washing.

Small pieces of chamois leather (often called "chamois cloth") are commonly used as blending tools by artists drawing with charcoal. The leather blends the charcoal more softly and cleanly than the artist's fingers, which can leave smudges. The chamois is also used to lighten the drawing (or portions of it) by removing some charcoal in a more subtle and nuanced way than most erasers could. The charcoal can be washed from the leather using soap and water.

Chamois leather is used around professional film and video camera viewfinders, as it provides comfort and absorbs sweat from camera operators who spend a long time with their eye planted on the viewfinder.

Divers use towels made of chamois leather to dry themselves between dives, as they can be quickly dried by squeezing or wringing them.
