= Washcloth =

Small cloth used for washing the body

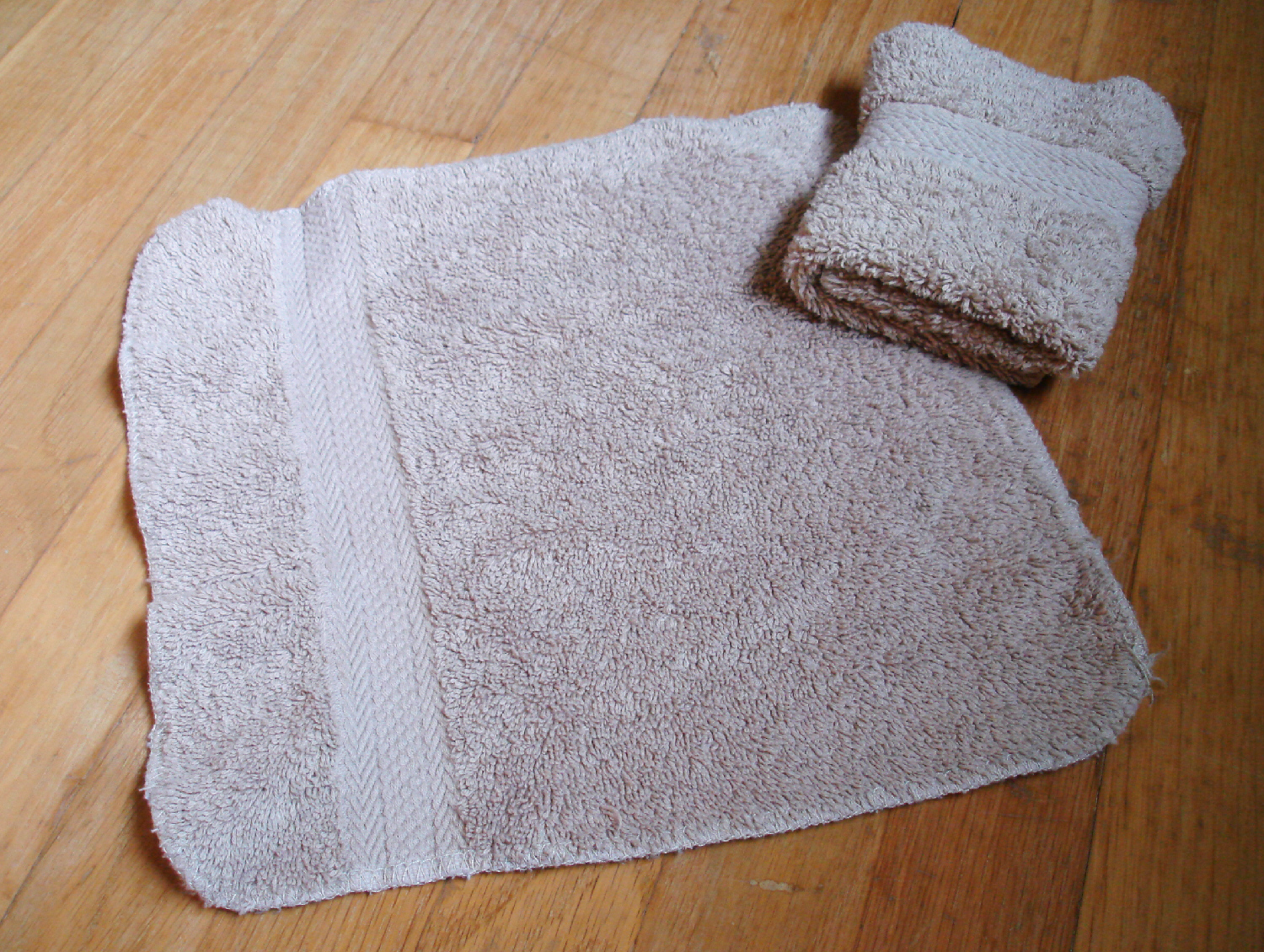

A washcloth, wash-cloth, washrag (North American English) (Note: A Hungarian word translated as "washcloths" (2022) was in usage during 1816) or facecloth, flannel (British English) or cleansing cloth is a rectangular or square piece of cloth used in personal hygiene, for washing the body.

Washcloths are useful for cleansing or removing dead skin (stratum corneum). Washcloths are typically made of terrycloth and measure around 12x12 inches in size. A sub-variant of the washcloth is the washing mitt. (Note: The washing mitt can also be used for washing cars.)

Washcloths are also used in the context of hospital settings to avoid infection on the pretext that basins pose the risk of multidrug resistant organism contamination. (Note: Prefabricated moist washcloths in packages were/are a possible source of a hospital infection) Superior pathogen elimination occurs using washcloths containing chlorhexidine.

Washcloths are used also in beauty care. In cosmetics the washcloth is a part of exfoliation.

== See also ==
- Cleanser
- Dishcloth
- Handkerchief
- Soap
- Toner
- Towel
