= Futa, Ghana =

Coordinates: 6°14′N 2°26′W

Futa is a community in Tamale Metropolitan District in the Northern Region of Ghana.

== History ==
Futa community is a Dagomba community located in the Dagbong Kingdom which is mostly dominated by the Dagombas.

== See also ==
- Suburbs of Tamale (Ghana) metropolis
