= Disposable towel =

Single-use cloth towel

A disposable towel is a single-use alternative to a reusable cloth towel. Disposable materials were originally designed for healthcare delivery and have been introduced to industries outside of healthcare systems, such as resorts, hotels, hospitality, exercise facilities and households.

Disposable towels are used to enhance infection control, convenience and decrease economic expenditure. Disposable towels are used in fields requiring sanitary conditions for minor, precise, or dirty jobs of cleaning and drying.

== See also ==
- Disposable
- Paper towel
- Dishcloth
