= Mitter curtain =

Car wash component

Mitter curtains are cloth-like or ribbon-styled materials that are used in many car washes worldwide. The term mitter is the generic word for a device that moves side-to-side, front-to-back or carousel styles as vehicles pass through the car wash. It's not known when mitters were first used in the car wash business; various sources, however, date first use to the late 1960s, 1970s or early 1980s. The baskets holding the curtains are usually stainless steel. Although mitter curtains are primarily used in car washes in North America, they also appear in Europe, Australia and Asia.

== Operation ==
In many car washes, the mitter curtains are used in place of top brushes (in some countries, the opposite is true). Some car washes carry both mitter curtains and top brushes, while others carry multiple mitters. The curtains are often preceded by rinse arches and followed by a foam applicator and car wash brushes.

Between 72 and 168 cars per hour travel through car washes with mitter curtains. The mitter curtains are cleaned daily with water and cleaning soaps. Some companies have mitter curtains that are less likely to become soaked with dirt and need cleaning. Although sometimes used in bay car washes, mitter curtains are more often used in tunnel car washes. Furthermore, some car wash networks operate mitters for drying alongside those for washing and cleaning.

== See also ==
- Auto detailing
