= Tenugui =

Traditional Japanese multi-purpose cloth

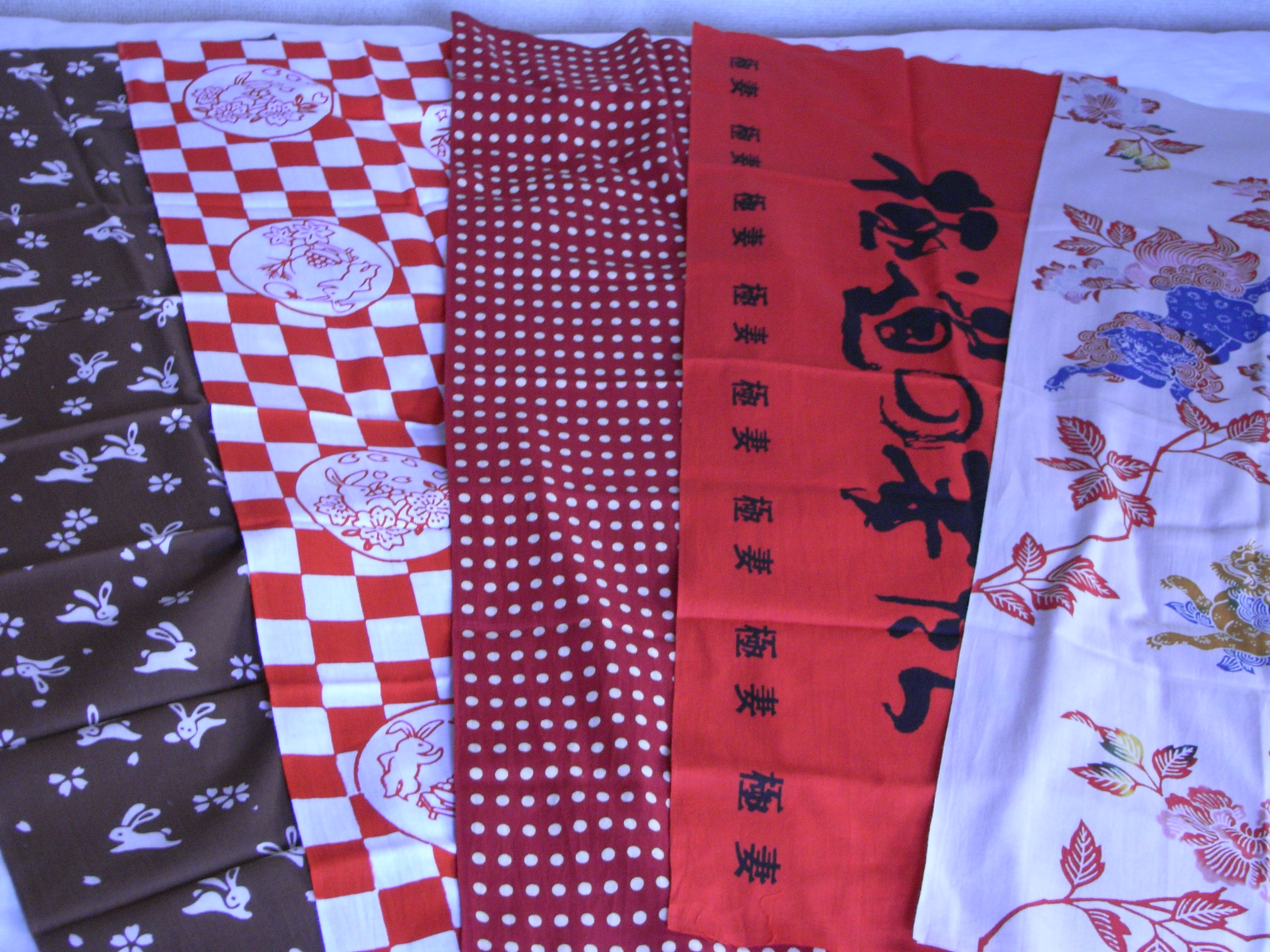

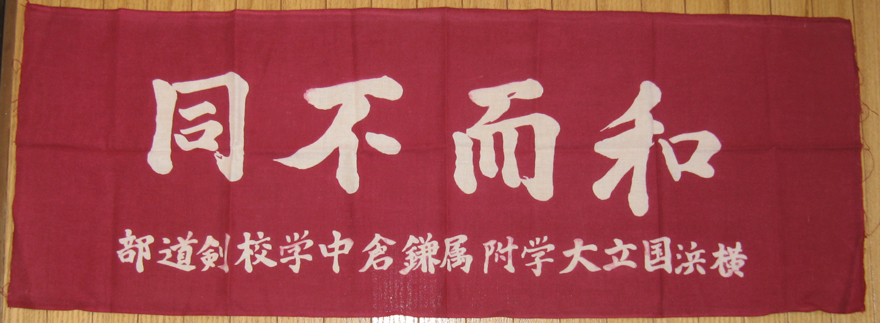
Tenugui are also worn, including by athletes. This is a typical Kendo-style tenugui.

A tenugui (手拭い) is a traditional Japanese decorative towel made from a thin and light cotton. It dates back to the Heian period or earlier. By the Edo period, tenugui became what they are today; about 35 by 90 centimetres (14 by 35 in) in size, plain woven, and almost always dyed with plain color or some pattern. The long sides are finished with a selvage, while the short sides are left unfinished to allow fraying.

Tenugui are traditionally used, tied in a specific manner, as a sling to wrap and carry bento boxes. Similarly, they're used to wrap items such as bottles. They are also used as hand towels, and often as headbands, such as for kendo. And they are widely used simply as souvenirs or decorations. Although tenugui were once used as dishcloths, today Western-style thick or terry cloth dishcloths have generally replaced tenugui for dishcloth use.
