= Petrol interceptor =

Trap used to filter out hydrocarbon pollutants from rainwater runoff

Petrol Interceptor Diagram, a Diagram showing how a petrol interceptor works

A petrol interceptor is a trap used to filter out hydrocarbon pollutants from rainwater runoff. It is typically used in road construction and on Petrol Station forecourts to prevent fuel contamination of streams carrying away the runoff.

Petrol interceptors work on the premise that some hydrocarbons such as petroleum and diesel float on the top of water. The contaminated water enters the interceptor typically after flowing off roads or forecourts and entering a channel drain before being deposited into the first tank inside the interceptor. The first tank builds up a layer of the hydrocarbon as well as other scum. Typically petrol interceptors have 3 separate tanks each connected with a dip pipe. As more liquid enters the interceptor the water enters into the second tank leaving the majority of the hydrocarbon behind as it cannot enter the dip pipe, whose opening into the second tank is below the surface of the water. However some of the contaminants may by chance enter the second tank. This second tank will not build up as much of the hydrocarbon on its surface. As before, the water is pushed into the third tank, by fluid dynamics, as more water enters the second. The third tank should be practically clear of any hydrocarbon floating on its surface. As a precaution, the outlet pipe is also a dip pipe. When the water leaves the third tank via the outlet pipe it should be contaminant free.
