= Towel =

Absorbent cloth, or paper, for drying or wiping

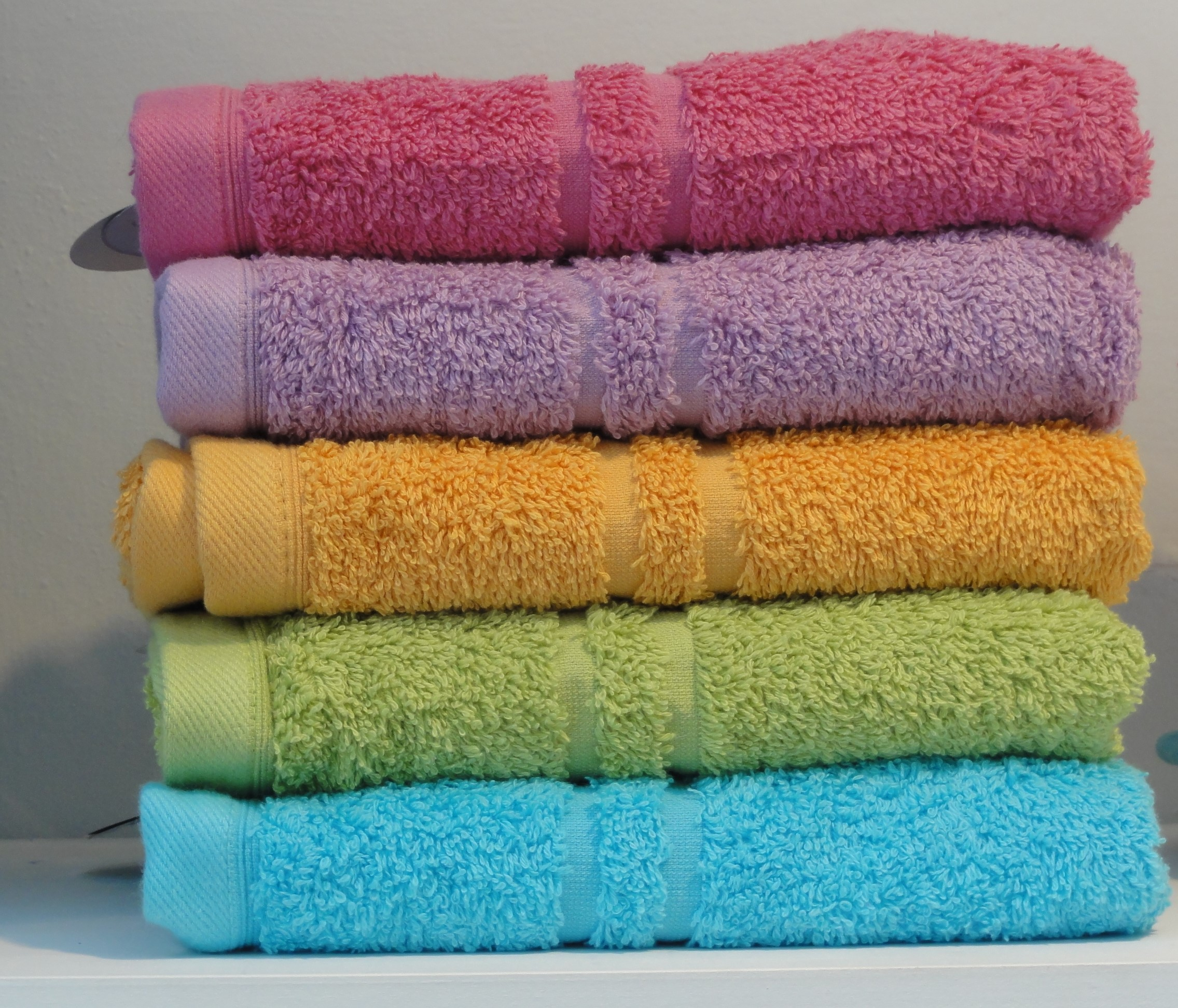
Colored bath towels

A towel is a piece of absorbent cloth, or paper, used for drying or wiping a surface. Towels draw moisture through direct contact.

In households, various types of towels are used for a variety of functions, such as hand towels, bath towels, and kitchen towels. Bathing towels and hand towels are usually made of cotton, linen, bamboo and synthetic microfibers. Paper towels are often provided in commercial or office bathrooms, via a dispenser, for users to dry their hands. They are also used for such duties such as wiping, cleaning, and drying.

== History ==
By the late first century BCE, Strabo describes asbestos that "is combed and woven ... into towels" which were cleaned after use by placing them in a fire rather than washing them.

According to Middle Ages archaeological studies, "... closely held personal items included the ever-present knife and a towel."

The invention of the modern towel, made with terrycloth, is commonly associated with the city of Bursa, Turkey, in the 17th century. These Turkish towels began as a flat, woven piece of cotton or linen called a peshtamal, often hand-embroidered. Long enough to wrap around the body, peshtamal were originally fairly narrow, but are now wider and commonly measure 90 by 170 centimetres (35 in × 67 in). Peshtamel were used in hammams ("Turkish baths") as they stayed light when wet and were very absorbent.

As the Ottoman Empire grew, so did the use of the towel. Weavers were asked to embroider more elaborate designs, aided by their knowledge of carpet-weaving. By the 18th century, towels began to feature loops sticking up from the pile of the material. These looped towels became known as havly; over time, this word has changed to havlu, the Turkish word for towel, and means 'with loops'.

Towels did not become affordable until the 19th century, with the cotton trade and industrialization. With mechanization, cotton terry towelling became available by the yard as well as being stocked in shops as pre-made towels. Today, towels come in a variety of sizes, materials and designs.

== Types ==
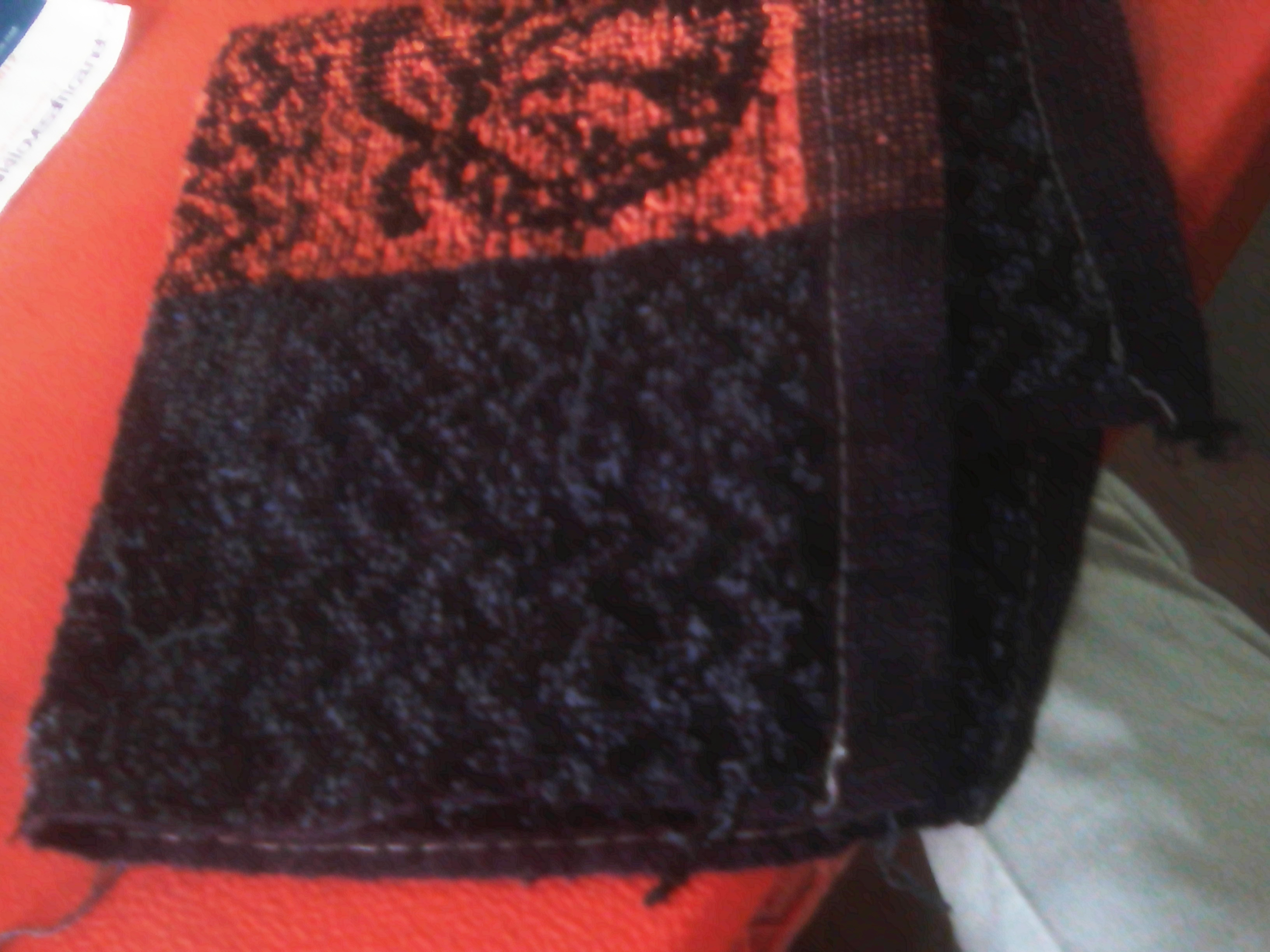
A hand-made African towel

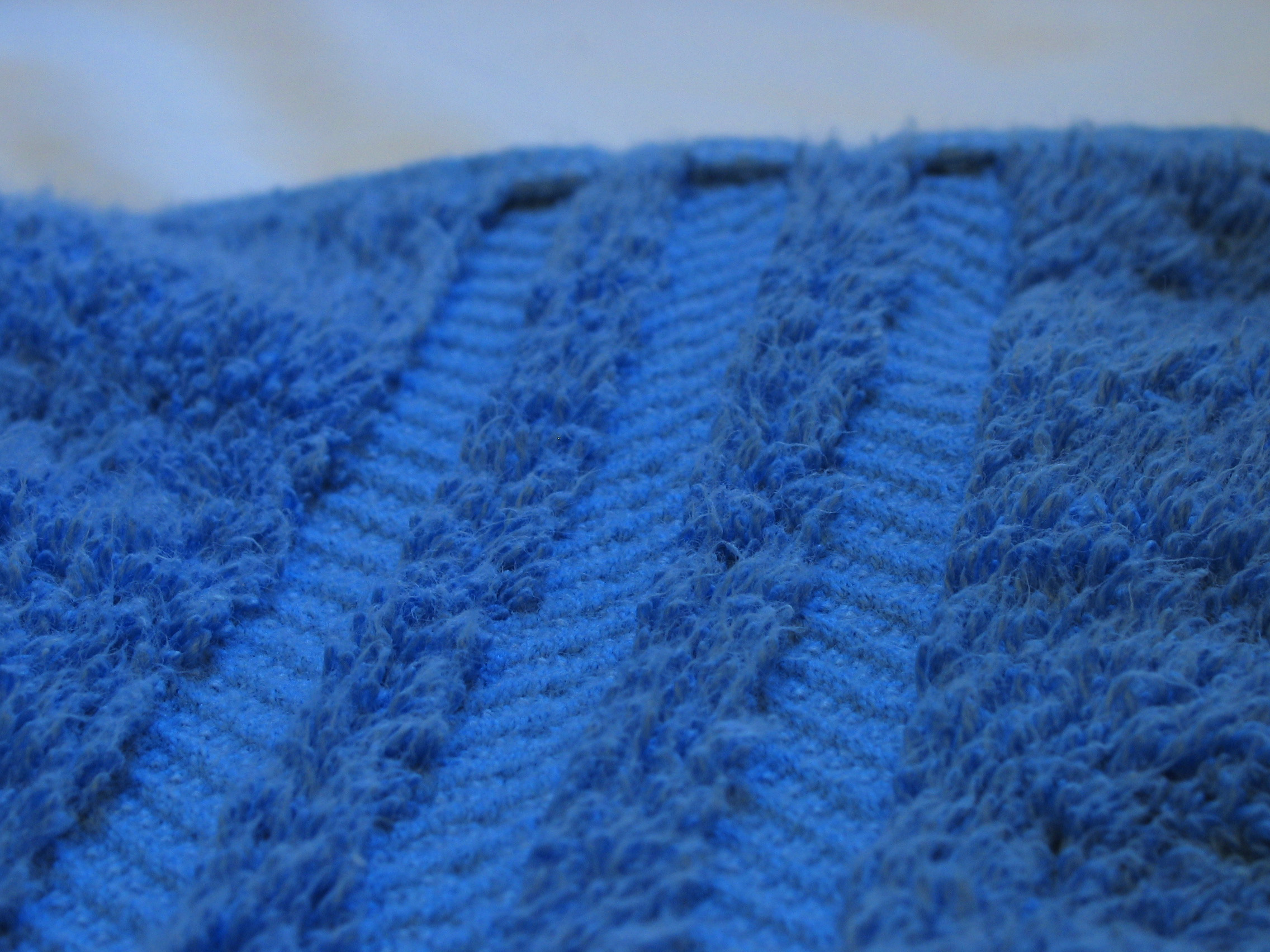
Close-up photo of a bath towel, made of terrycloth, showing the absorbing fibres, along with a decorative pattern

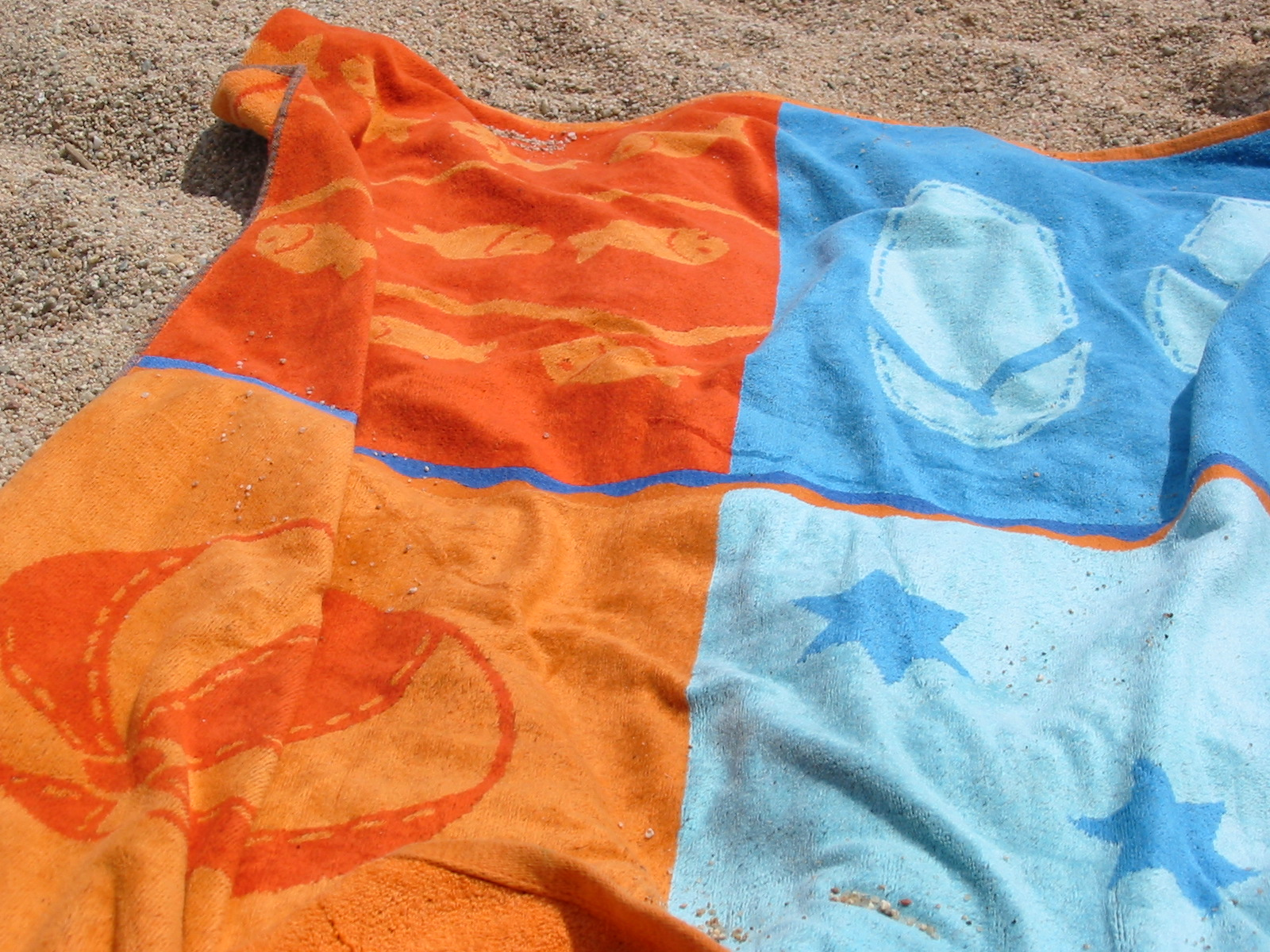
A beach towel

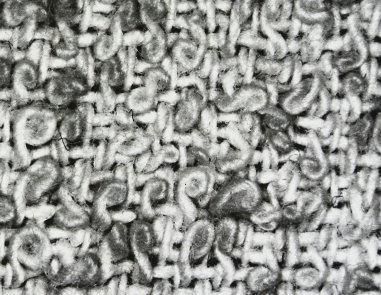
Fibres in a tea towel

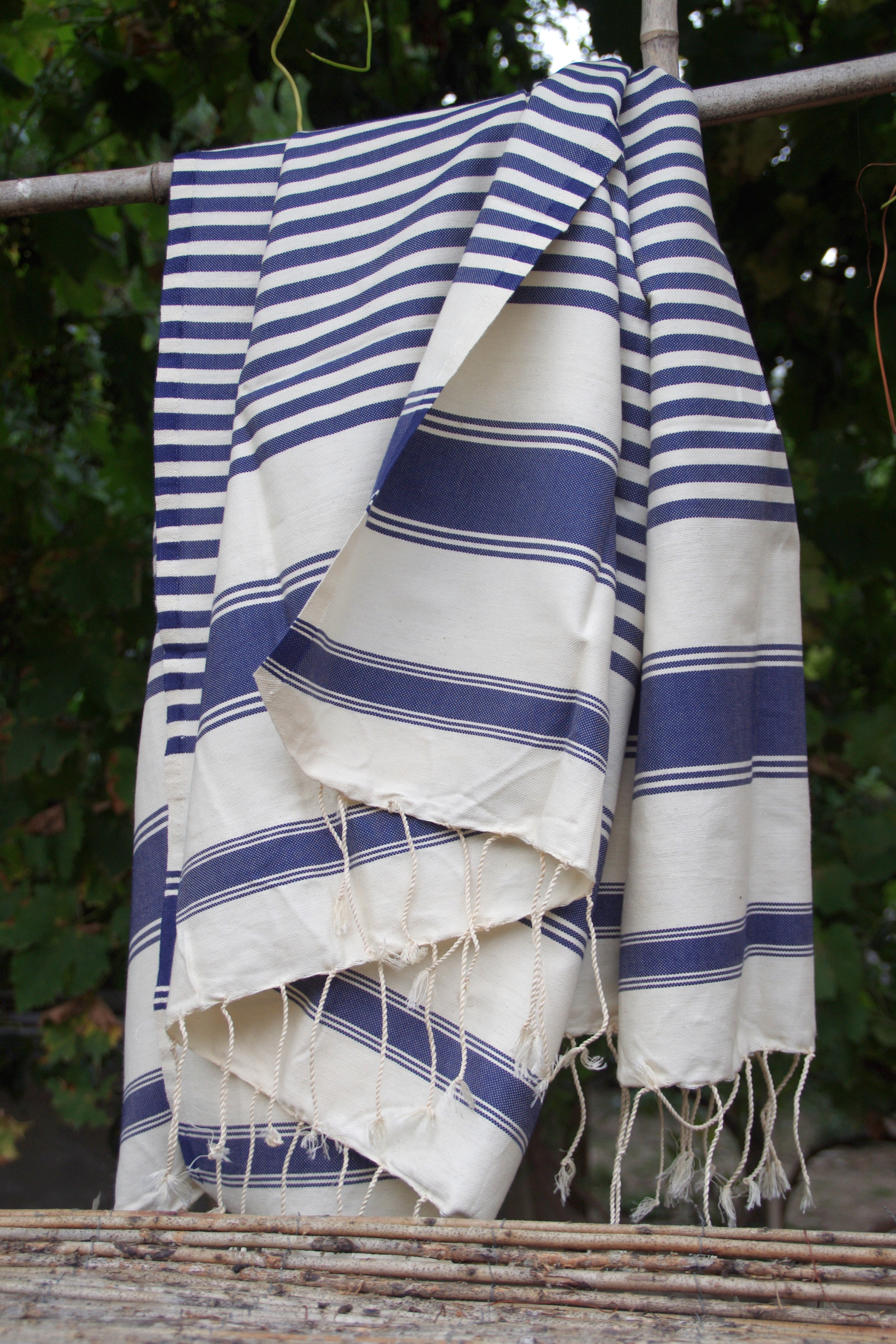
Tunisian fouta towel

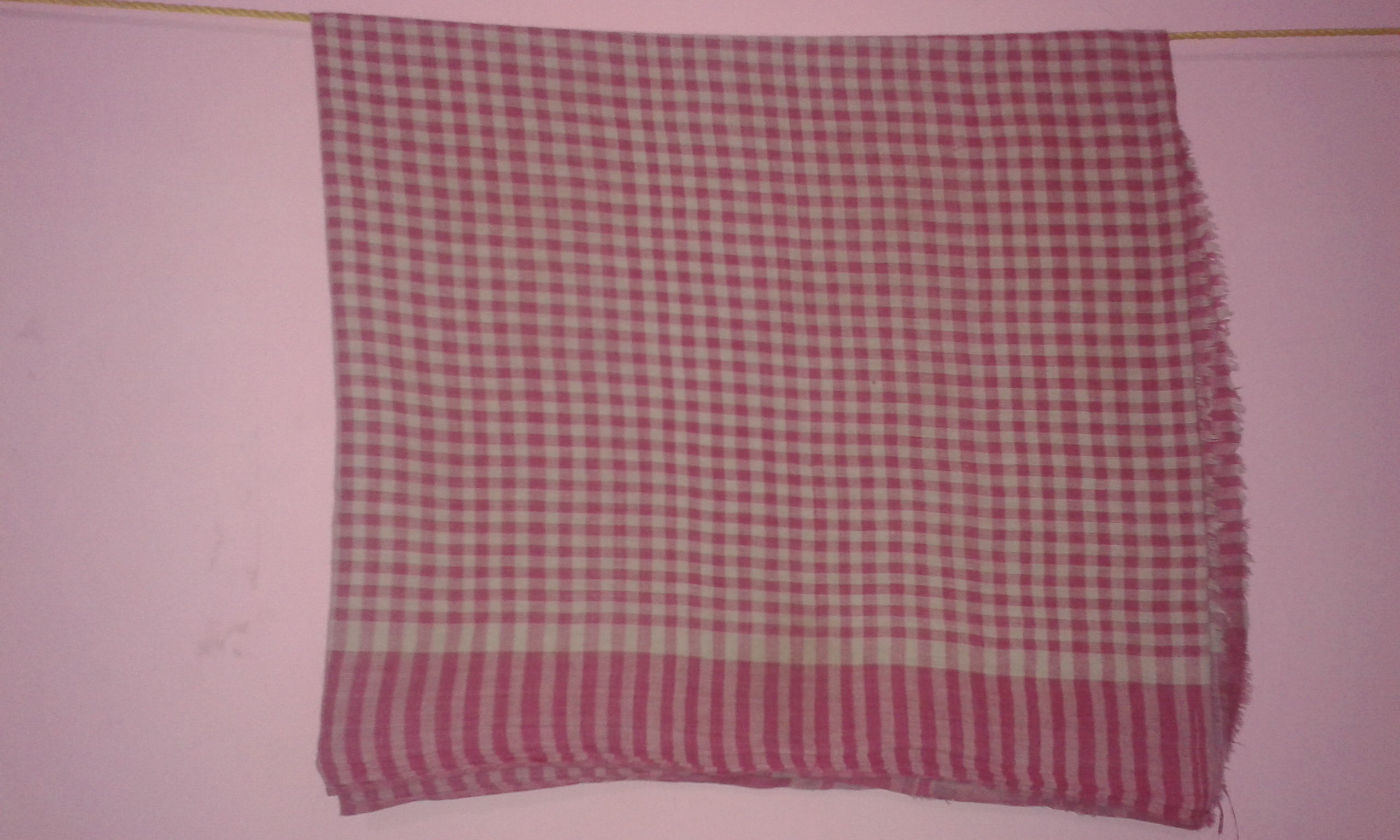
Gamcha a type of towel from India
- A bath towel is used for drying the body when it is wet, such as after bathing or showering. It is typically rectangular, with a typical size around 30 in × 60 in (76 cm × 152 cm), and is made of terrycloth.
- A beach towel is usually somewhat larger and thinner than a bath towel, and often has a colorful pattern. Although often used for drying off after being in the water, its main purpose is to provide a surface on which to lay down. They are also worn for privacy while changing clothes in a public area, and for wiping sand from the body or objects.
- A bath sheet (or sheet towel) is larger than a bath towel. The classic bath sheet size is 80×160 cm. A large bath sheet that can wrap the entire body is 100×150 cm or 90×160 cm. They are used after bathing, in saunas, on beaches, and for massage.
- A face towel is smaller than a bath towel used especially for drying the face. It is often made of smooth-surfaced material such as linen.
- A foot towel is a small, rectangular towel that, in the absence of a rug, carpet or bathroom mat, is placed on the bathroom floor to stand on after finishing a shower or bath.
- A hand towel is significantly smaller than a bath towel (perhaps 12 in × 24 in (30 cm × 61 cm)), and is used for drying the hands after washing them.
- An oven towel or confectioner's mitten is a multipurpose household towel used for a kitchen or shop applications.
- A paper towel is a piece of paper that can be used once as a towel and then be disposed of. A perforated roll of paper towels is usually mounted on a rod slightly longer than the width of the roll, or in an alternative type of hanger that has protrusions on ears, the protrusions fitting into the ends of the paper towel roll. Paper towels might also be packaged as facial tissues are (as individual folded sheets).
- A disposable towel (or non-woven towel) is a towel intended for a single user, but not necessarily for a single use, as it can be reused but not washed. It is often made of non-woven fibres and often is used in hospitals, hotels, geriatric and salon or beauty settings, for their hygienic properties.
- A show towel is a bath or hand towel with a trim (such as satin, lace or linen) stitched onto it, or embroidery done on it—mostly for visual appeal. These types of towels are used to add a decorative touch, most commonly in the United States. They are generally not to be used for drying, as regular washing ruins the added trim, and the towels usually shrink differently than the trim.
- A sports towel is a synthetic or semi-synthetic towel originally developed for swimmers and divers, favoured for its super-absorbent qualities. Sports towels can be wrung out when saturated, leaving the towel able to absorb water again, though not dry. These qualities, along with their compact nature, have further popularized sports towels among general outdoor and athletic enthusiasts. The absorbent material in sports towels may be composed of viscose, PVA or microfiber, with polyester woven in for durability. Some manufacturers incorporate a silver ion or compound treatment into their towels to better inhibit microbial growth and associated odors.
- The term kitchen towel refers to a dish towel in American English (called a tea towel in UK and Canadian English), and to a paper towel in British English.
- A tea towel or tea cloth (UK and Canadian English), called dishtowel or dish towel in America, is an absorbent towel made from soft, lint-free linen. They are used in the kitchen to dry dishes, cutlery, etc. after they are washed. The towels are also used during tea time. They can be wrapped around the tea pot to keep the tea warm, prevent drips, and keep one's hand from being burned by the hot tea pot handle when serving the tea. They are commonly made of cotton rather than linen. They are also used for drying glassware, but sometimes a special glass cloth is used for that purpose. Tea towels originated in 18th-century England.
- A tenugui is a variety of hand towel that originates from Japan. It is most often used in the same way as a tea towel or flannel (washcloth), but can also be used for decoration, as a headband, or for wrapping bottles and other items to be given as gifts.
- A cloth towel dispenser or continuous cloth towel is a towel manipulated by a series of rollers, used as an alternative to paper towels and hand dryers in public washrooms. These may have a lower environmental impact than paper towels, though concerns over hygiene mean they are not used by some organisations and have greatly declined in popularity.
- A bar towel is an absorbent, usually small, towel used in bars and often given away free as promotional items.
- A fingertip towel or finger towel is a small towel that is folded and placed next to the sink or in the guest bedroom. Hosts often pin a note to these towels indicating that they are for guest use.
- A golf towel is a small towel which usually comes with a loop or clip to attach to a golf bag for drying hands, golfballs, and clubs.
- A baby towel is a smaller towel with an extra sewn-on hood at one corner to cover a baby's head.
- A peshtemal (or pestemal) is a unique multipurpose towel from Anatolia.
- A poncho towel is a wearable towel made for drying off and changing, often used poolside, at the beach or after swimming.
- A fouta towel is a Tunisian hammam and beach towel, which is also used as a pareo.

== In fiction ==
In The Hitchhiker's Guide to the Galaxy by Douglas Adams, there is an in-world emphasis on towels, which are said to be of "immense psychological value". A non-hitchhiker who sees that a hitchhiker has a towel will assume, "for some reason", that the latter also has a wide variety of other useful items (including food, toiletries and clothing) and will lend the hitchhiker any of these things that they appear to have "lost". Towel Day is held annually as a tribute to Adams.

== See also ==
- Huckaback fabric
- Terrycloth
- Towel tablet
