= Exfoliation (cosmetology) =

Removal of dead skin cells from the epidermis

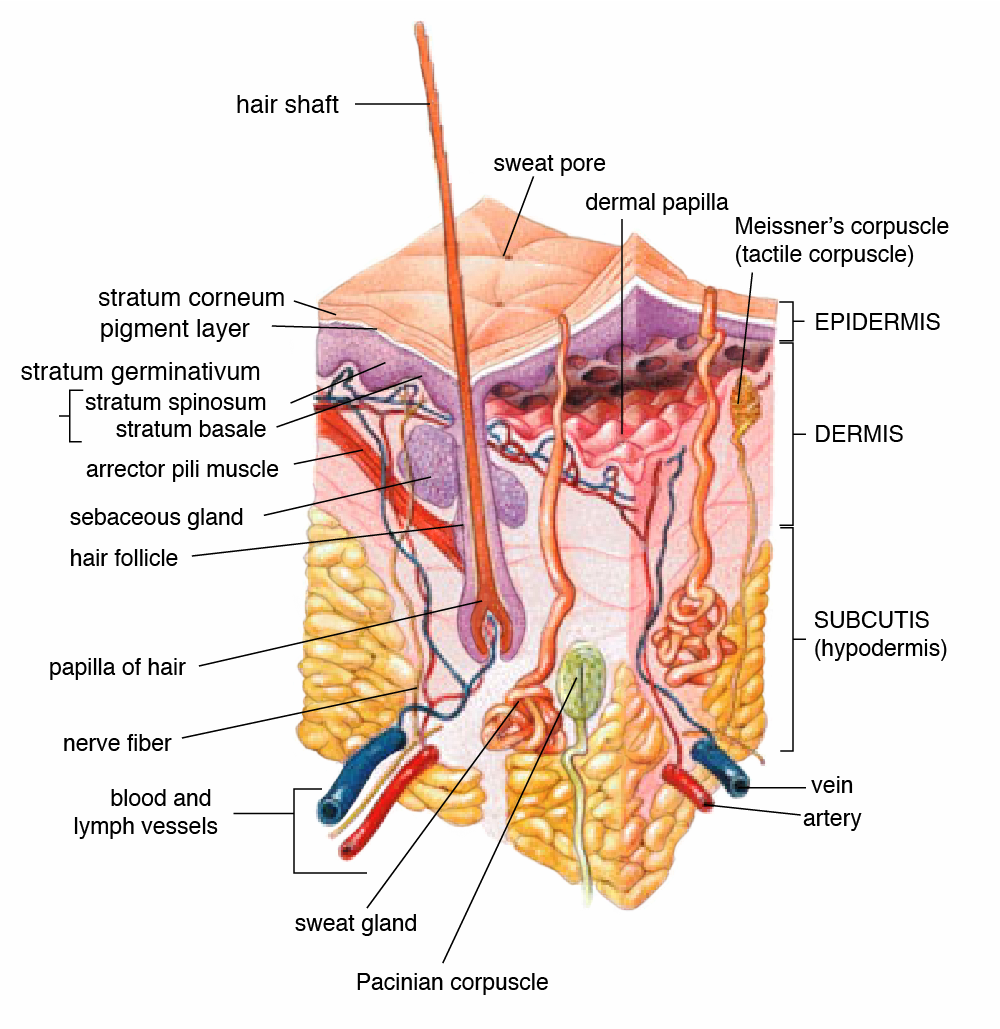
Cross-section of all skin layers

In cosmetology, exfoliation is the removal of the surface skin cells and built-up dirt from the skin's surface. The term comes from the Latin word exfoliare ('to strip off leaves'). This is a regular practice within the cosmetic industry, both for its outcome of promoting skin regeneration as well as providing a deep cleanse of the skin barrier. Being used in facials, this process can be achieved by mechanical or chemical means, such as microdermabrasion or chemical peels. Exfoliants are advertised as treatments that enhance beauty and promote a youthful and healthy appearance.

== History ==
Exfoliation was first practiced among the ancient Egyptians. This was also used in China, during the Qing Dynasty (1644–1912).

== Mechanical exfoliation ==
Mechanical exfoliation methods involve physically scrubbing the skin with an abrasive material. These types of exfoliants include microfiber cloths, adhesive exfoliation sheets, microbead facial scrubs, crêpe paper, crushed apricot kernel or almond shells, sugar or salt crystals, pumice, and abrasive materials such as sponges, loofahs, brushes, and fingernails. A variety of facial scrubs are available in over-the-counter products for application by the user. People with dry skin should avoid exfoliants which have a significant portion of pumice, or crushed volcanic rock. Pumice is known as a material to exfoliate the skin of the feet.

=== Loofah ===
Loofahs are shower accessories that are commonly used for a dual purpose of cleaning and exfoliating the skin. Loofahs are named for the tropical and subtropical gourd within the cucumber family called luffa that is used as material to make the shower sponges. As the luffa plant matures, its fibers dry out, allowing the shell left over to be used as the spongy material for the exfoliation tool after their seeds are removed and the gourd is sliced and shaped.

Loofahs offer benefits beyond exfoliation: they effectively spread soap around the body to cleanse and they stimulate blood circulation during use. Because loofahs are porous, they are more susceptible to harboring bacteria and fungal organisms that could be harmful and cause infections. Proper care for the loofah includes rinsing and drying the loofah after each use and soaking the loofah in a diluted solution of bleach to clean it weekly. It is also recommended to replace a loofah every 3 to 4 weeks.

=== Exfoliation net ===
Exfoliation nets are shower accessories used for exfoliation and lathering that are composed of nylon material in the form of knotted mesh nets. Exfoliation nets are native to Ghana, but they are a familiar shower accessory in numerous countries in West Africa. The shape and material allow exfoliation nets to dry quicker than typical sponges, so there is less accumulation of bacteria in the accessory.

Proper care for exfoliation nets includes leaving the net to hang dry between uses and cleaning it using a washing machine or hand-wash method weekly.

=== Microbead scrubs ===
Microbead scrubs are cosmetic products that contain small plastic spheres that act as exfoliating components when scrubbed against skin. The plastic beads act as alternatives for natural, eco-friendly exfoliating agents such as pumice, oatmeal, and walnut husks. Microbeads are commonly composed of the material polyethylene terephthalate, but can also be made with other plastic materials.

When scrubbed against the skin, the beads polish the skin by removing the dead skin cells from the top layer of the skin. The steps involved to use a micro-bead scrub include softening the skin using lukewarm water, gently scrubbing the product against the skin in circular motions, and rinsing the product off the skin.

Being non-biodegradable, microplastic beads have a detrimental environmental impact, particularly causing harm to marine ecosystems. Consequently, they have been banned by many countries.

=== Pumice ===
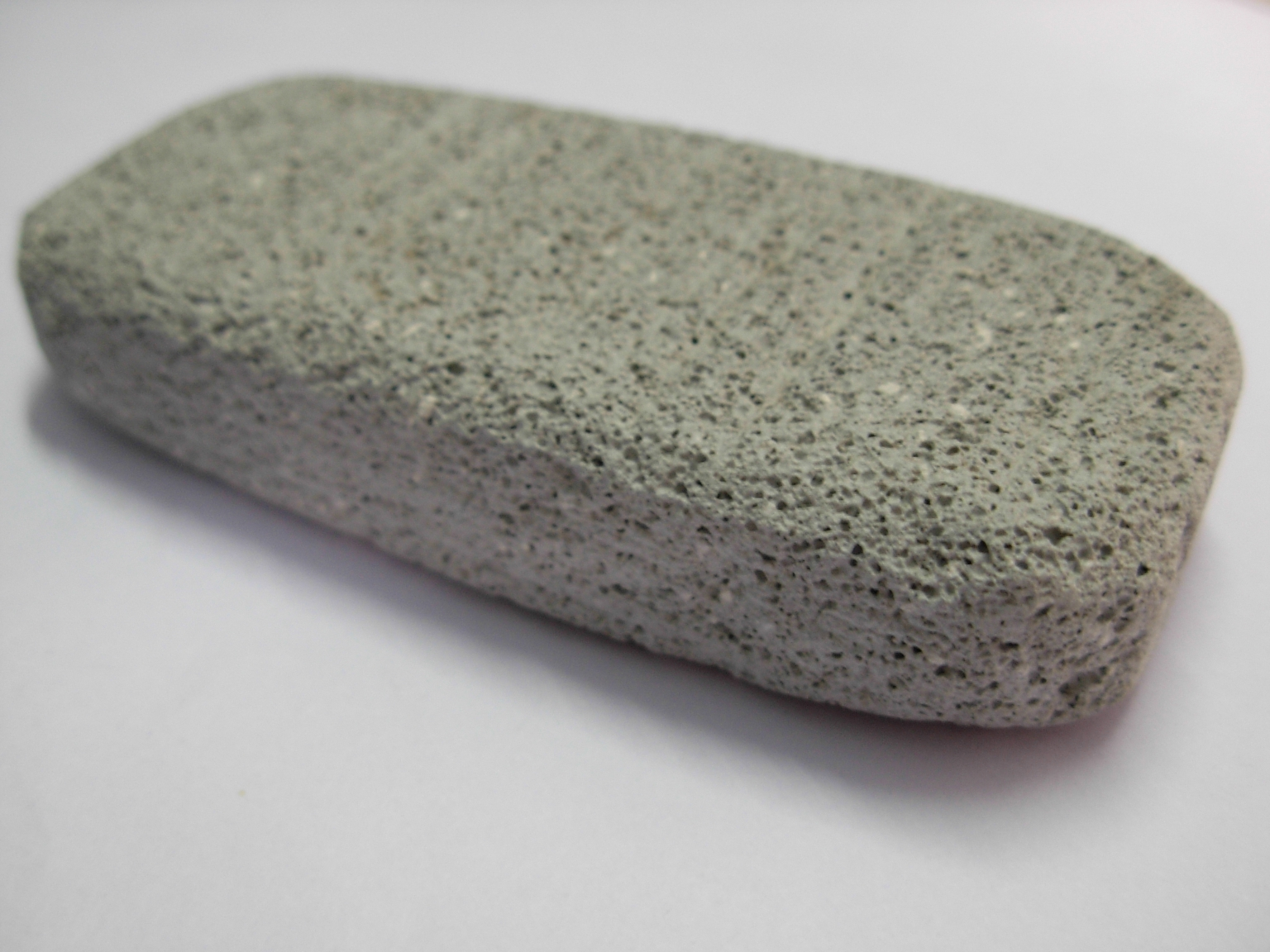
Pumice stone

Pumice, an igneous rock that is composed of solidified lava that rapidly cools with gas bubbles being trapped inside of it, is commonly used as an exfoliating material. Pumice is a decently abrasive material, making it useful as an exfoliating agent.

Pumice stone can be effectively used as an exfoliation tool on calluses or corns, often found on feet, to remove the dead skin cells.

To effectively use a pumice stone as an exfoliation tool, soaking the affected area in warm water until the skin begins to soften is a recommended first step. The pumice stone then must be wet before rubbing against the affected area with moderate pressure for about 2 to 3 minutes.

=== Dermaplaning ===
The exfoliating process of dermaplaning requires a single blade razor resembling a scalpel called a dermatome. The dermatome is gently dragged across the skin on the face to remove the top layer of dead skin cells and peach fuzz. This process helps the skin to absorb products better and to improve the texture of the skin. Dermaplaning does not stimulate collagen production.

A common misconception is that the vellus hair (known as peach fuzz) that is removed via dermaplaning will grow back thicker and darker, giving the appearance of a beard. This has been denied by dermaplaning specialists, who state that the removal of the dead skin and peach fuzz does not impact growth, color, or texture of facial hair.

The procedure is recommended to be performed by an aesthetician. In most cases, the blade must be used on clean, dry skin and covers the forehead, cheeks, chin, nose, and neck. However, dermaplaning can also be performed on skin that has oil applied to it.

=== Hair removal ===
Some methods of hair removal also mechanically exfoliate the skin.

Waxing functions as an exfoliant, plucking the hair out of the skin. While it can be performed every two to eight weeks, waxing is not carried out as frequently as many exfoliants. Thus, it does not fully substitute for an exfoliation regimen.

Wet shaving also has exfoliating properties. Gliding a shaving brush vigorously across the face removes dead skin cells and cleanses the skin simultaneously. After applying the lather with a brush, the use of a razor removes dead skin because the razor is dragged closely across the skin. Manual razors exfoliate more effectively than electric razors.

== Chemical exfoliation ==
=== History ===
Methods of chemical exfoliation for aesthetic enhancement of the skin have dated back to the time of the Ancient Egyptians, who used a combination of animal oils, alabaster, salt, and sour milk as an exfoliant to improve skin quality. Various other chemical exfoliation techniques were developed in multiple other civilizations, such as Greek, Roman, Turkish, Indian, and Hungarian peoples.

Chemical exfoliation to lessen the appearance of freckles with phenol peeling was a method developed by Tilbury Fox in 1871, and from there the use of phenol peeling increased in popularity.

=== Methods ===
Chemical exfoliation methods, also known as chemical peeling, utilizes chemical substances in order to remove dead skin cells from the face. These types of exfoliants contain alpha-hydroxy acids (glycolic acid, lactic acid, mandelic acid, malic acid, tartaric acid, and citric acid), beta hydroxy acids (salicylic acid), polyhydroxy acids (lactobionic acid, gluconolactone, and galactose) or enzymes (trypsin or collagenase). These chemicals weaken cell adhesion, allowing them to ease away. Out of these, only alpha-hydroxyl acids (AHAs) and beta hydroxyl acids (BHAs) are available on the market for daily use. While AHAs are applied to clear the outer layer of the skin, BHAs penetrate and clean it from within. These scrubs may be applied in high concentrations by medical professionals, or provided in lower concentrations via over-the-counter products. This type of exfoliation is recommended for people treating acne. In Continental European beauty spa treatments, wine-producing grapes are considered to have exfoliating properties and are used in the practice of vinotherapy.

Though primarily intended for hair removal, chemical depilatory, such as Nair and shaving powder, also function as a chemical exfoliant. Such products contain calcium hydroxide and/or thioglycolic acid. They are applied more frequently than waxing (once a week) since they only partially destroy the hair below the skin, rather than pulling up the entire root as waxing does. Using them weekly can substitute for a weekly exfoliant regime.

== Technological exfoliation ==
Technological advances in the cosmetics industry have led to innovative exfoliation techniques, such as laser resurfacing.

=== Ablative laser resurfacing ===
Most commonly used for facial rejuvenation, this exfoliation process utilizes a laser to treat flaws on the skin surface. This method of exfoliation is most effective for treating wrinkles and discoloration. Carbon dioxide lasers, erbium lasers, and combinations of these are examples of the types of ablative lasers that are used in the resurfacing process.

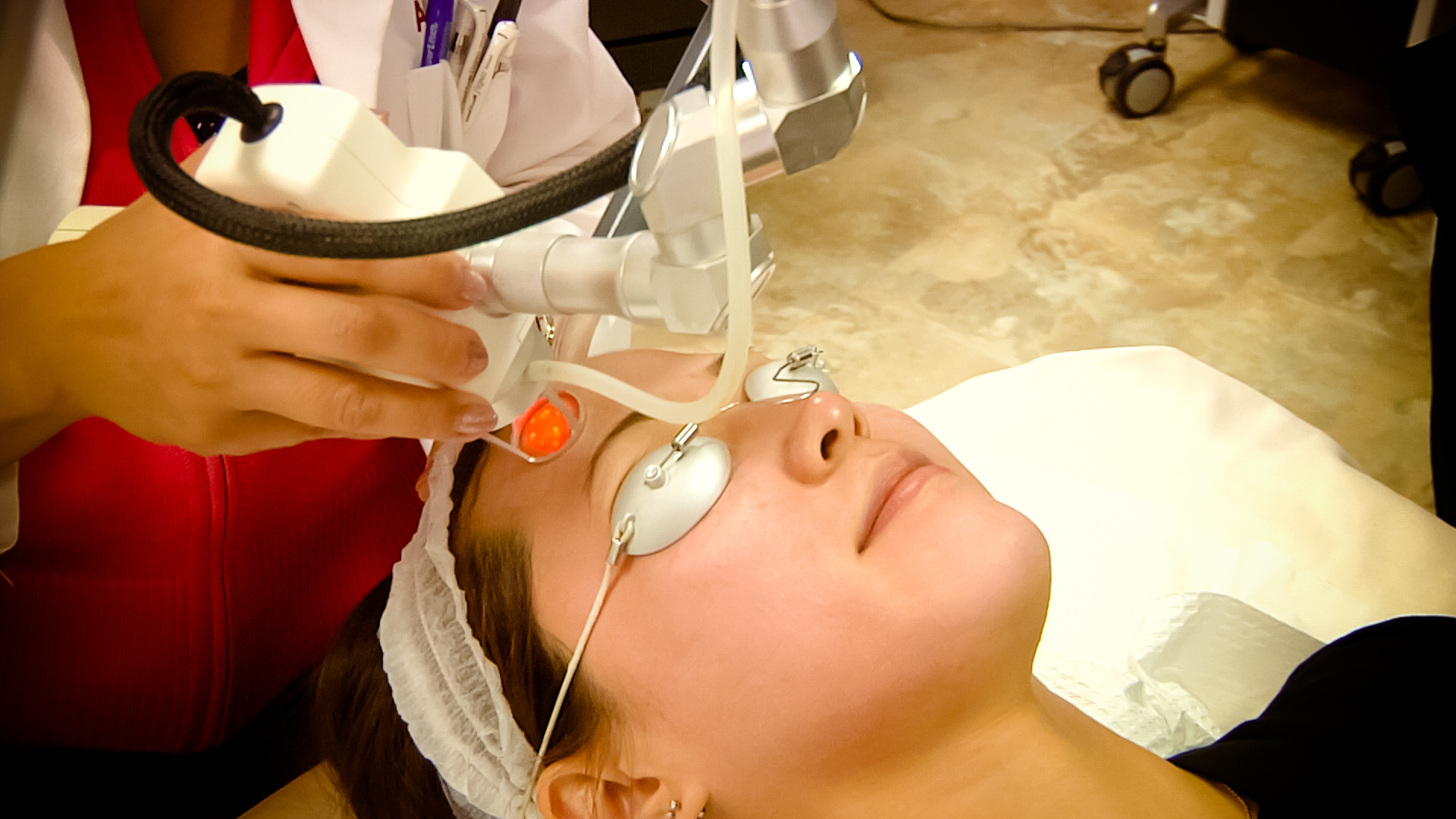
Fractional ablative laser resurfacing procedure

The top outer layer of the skin is removed by the laser, which simultaneously heats the layer of skin lying beneath it. This process encourages collagen growth, which will improve the texture and tightness of the skin. The top layer of the skin will continue to heal and grow back to reveal a smoother and tighter appearance.

Fractional versions of ablative lasers have also recently been developed. These are designed to leave minimal amounts of untreated tissue on the skin to provide quicker healing time and fewer side effects.

Ablative laser resurfacing has multiple risks associated with the exfoliation process. These risks include: redness, swelling, itching, pain, acne, infection, skin discoloration, and scarring.

To have ablative laser resurfacing performed, one must consult with a doctor to review suitability of the procedure.

=== Dermabrasion ===
Dermabrasion is used to reduce the appearance of flaws on facial skin, such as facial lines, wrinkles, scars, and discoloration. In this exfoliation process, a rapidly rotating device is used to remove the outermost layer of facial skin.

Dermabrasion requires anesthetics to numb the skin before the procedure. Depending on the extent of the treatment, further numbing medication might be provided to limit the amount of pain felt from the treatment.

There are multiple risks associating with dermabrasion. These risks include: redness, swelling, acne, enlarged pores, skin discoloration, infection, scarring, or rashes. In most cases, skin that is treated with dermabrasion will be sensitive with splotches of redness and discoloration for weeks following the procedure.

== Disadvantages ==
According to dermatologists, chemical or manual exfoliation is not medically necessary, as dead skin cells already exfoliate naturally, and excessive artificial exfoliation can break the skin's barrier against microorganisms and lead to infection, as well as tightness and sensitivity in the skin. Artificial exfoliation can exacerbate dry, flaky skin, which needs moisturization for repair, and can result in some initial redness to the skin. Near the end of chemical peels, the skin frosts, with colors varying from a bright white to grey on the skin surface.

=== Marine environmental impact of microbeads ===
Microbead particles used in mechanical exfoliation are too small (less than 1 mm) to be caught by sewage works, so large amounts of microbeads are released into the environment, which damage marine ecosystems. Consequently, in June 2014, Illinois became the first American state to ban the use of microbeads, and cosmetics manufacturers such as L'Oreal, Johnson & Johnson, and Colgate agreed to use more natural ingredients.

== See also ==
- Chemical peel
- Debridement
- Exfoliating towel
- Medical spa
- Microdermabrasion
