= Auto detailing =

Activity to clean and maintain a vehicle

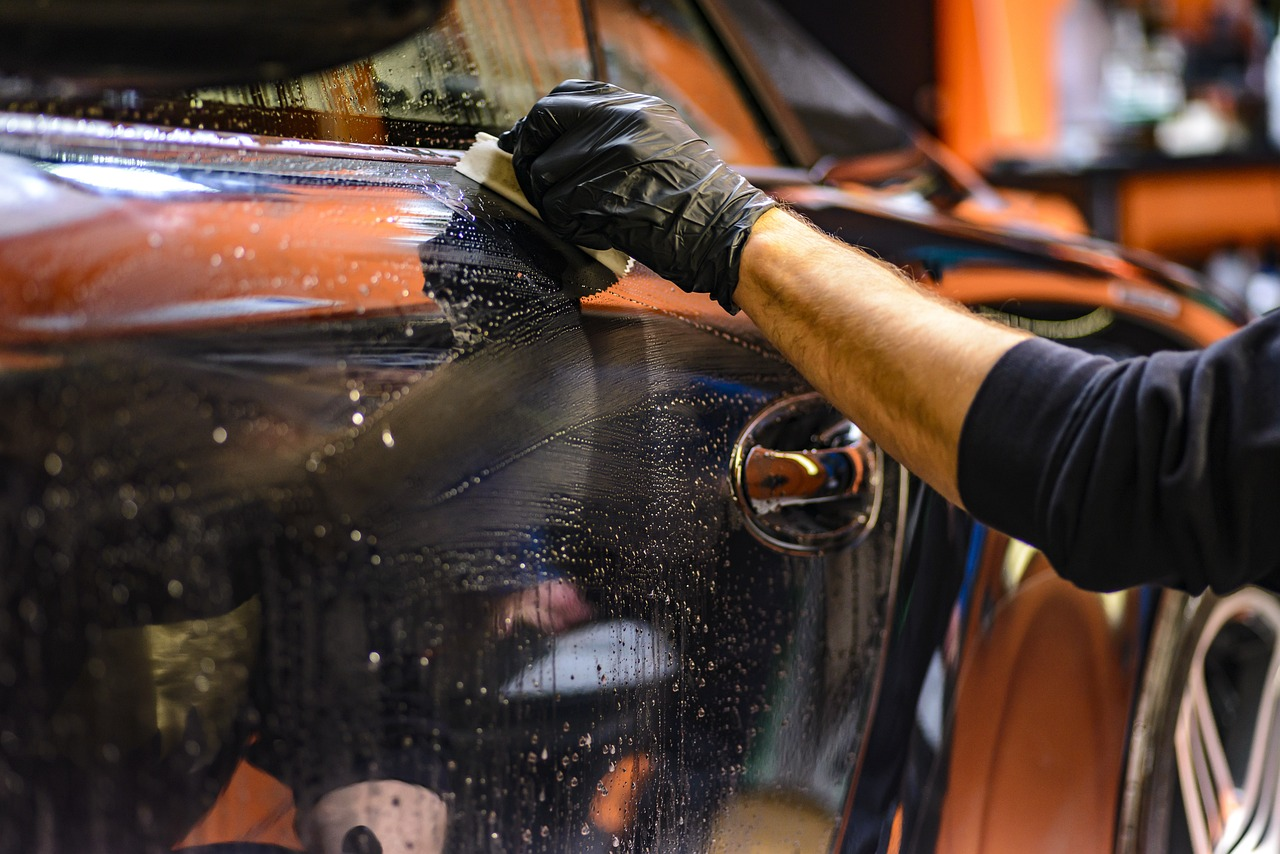
Initial washing phase of the auto detailing process

Auto detailing or car detailing is the set of technical procedures aimed at the thorough cleaning, aesthetic restoration, and protection of a vehicle's surfaces, both interior and exterior. The goal is to improve and preserve over time the aesthetic and structural condition of the materials, addressing defects, contamination, and signs of wear.

Detailing activities include washing, decontamination, polishing, and protection operations. Each phase involves the use of specific products and techniques depending on the material being treated, such as paint, glass, plastic, metal, leather, or fabric.

It goes beyond a standard car wash, focusing on deep interior cleaning and exterior polishing. It often requires manual cleaning methods or specific equipment to be carried out. This includes the treatment of furniture, carpets, leather and plastic surfaces, as well as control devices. Different cleaning and maintenance methods are used depending on the material.

== Detailing in the auto industry ==
Professional detailing services and the sale of products to both professionals and enthusiasts represent a significant commercial presence in places where automobiles are a major mode of transport.

The professional and home detailing industry in the United States experienced declining revenues from 2018 through 2022 due to the pandemic. Industry demand depends on the steady use of cars and motorists taking road trips. The industry experienced a 1.3% increase in 2023 to $14.6 billion, with profits reaching 16.1%.

In the United States, the market value of car care products and services in 2021 was estimated at $3.12 billion. Consumers are expected to spend on vehicle maintenance and appearance at a compound annual growth rate of 3.5% from 2022 through 2030.

As of 2024, the global car detailing services market was valued at approximately $41.40 billion and is expected to grow to $58.06 billion by 2030, reflecting a compound annual growth rate (CAGR) of 5.9% from 2025 to 2030.

== See also ==
- Automotive restoration
- Car wash
- Mitter curtain
