= Peshtemal =

Traditional towel used in baths in Turkey

Peştemal.

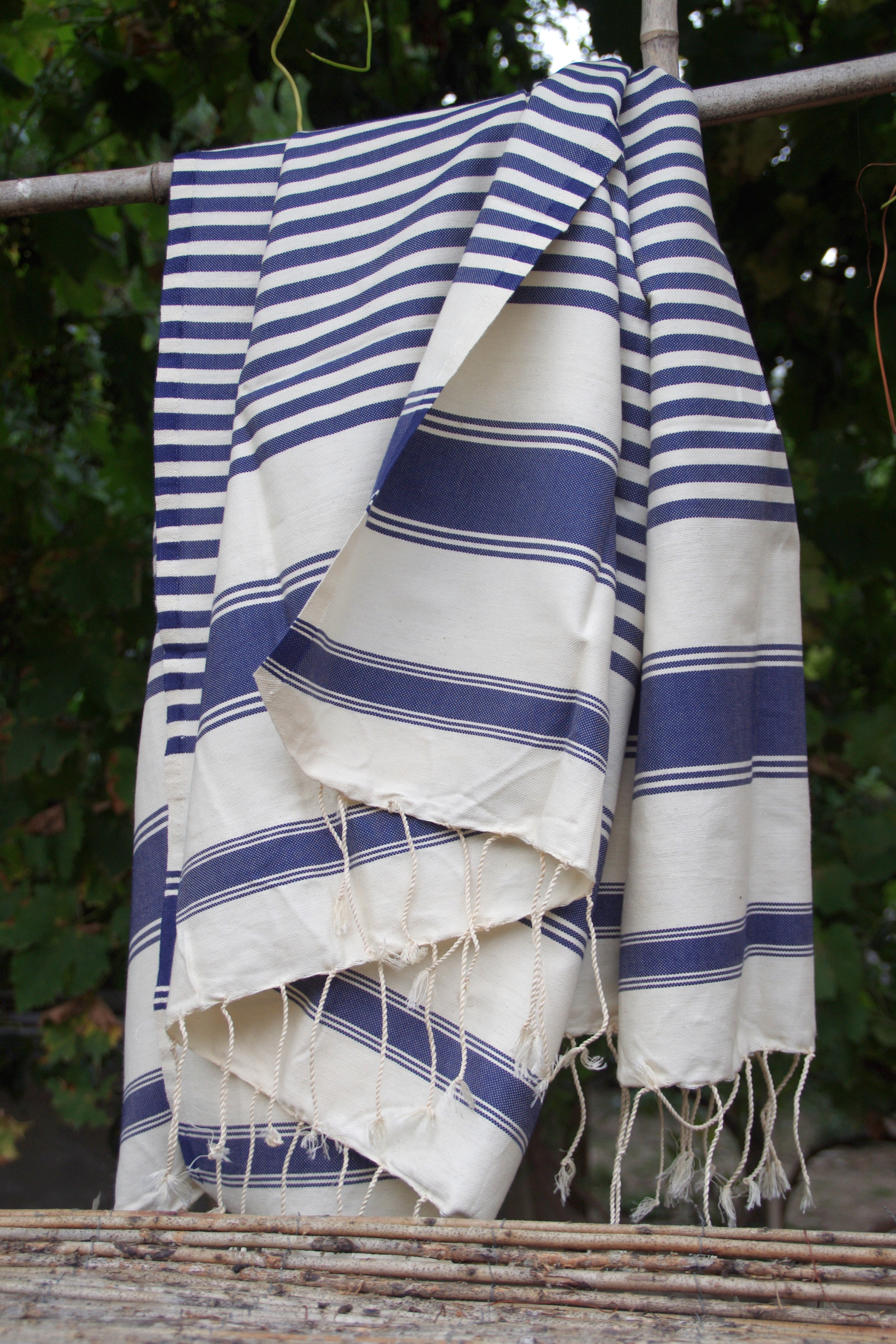
A hammam towel

A peshtemal (also spelled peshtamal, pestamal, or pestema; from Persian puştmāl 'back towel') is a traditional towel used in hammams. Ottoman culture, dating back hundreds of years, suggests the pestemal was originally designed to help individual bathers maintain their privacy. In addition to being highly absorbent, pestemals dry faster than thicker towels.

Traditionally, Turkish towel a red color with simple designs or shapes with black or white lines, but other colors and patterns are also common.

It is also used to indicate which region people are from. There are many kinds of peshtemal, with different styles and colors in different areas of Turkey.

The peshtemal absorbs water as fast as a terrycloth towel, dries more quickly, takes up less space, is easy to carry and is therefore used as an alternative in bathrooms, pools, spas, beaches, sports facilities, and for baby care.

The peshtemal fabric is made of 100% cotton produced on manually operated looms in modern Turkey, historically in Antioch.

== See also ==
- Fouta towel
