= Fouta towel =

Wrap or towel in the Mediterranean region

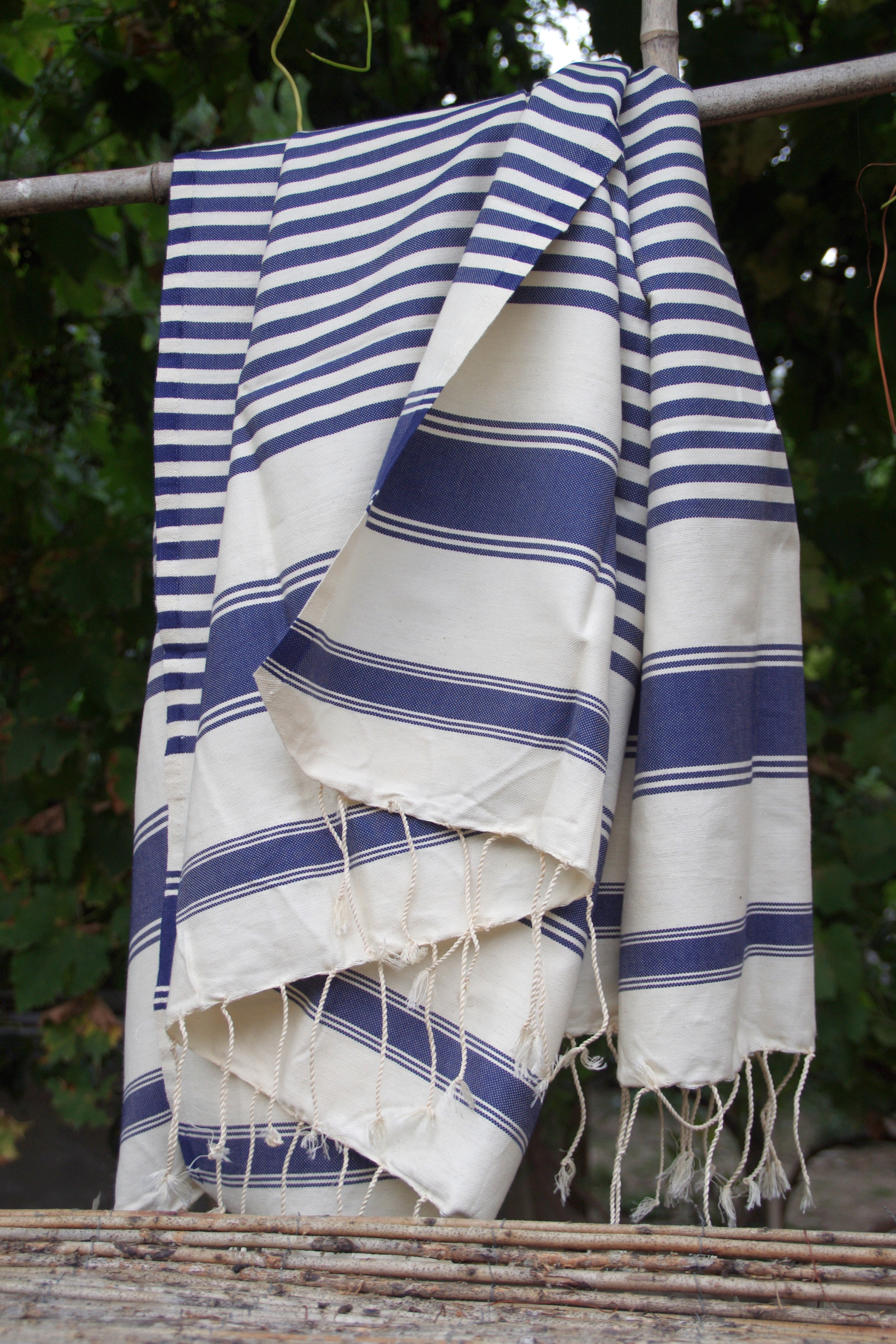
Tunisian fouta

The fouta (also spelled futa; Arabic: فوطة) is a piece of thin patterned cotton or linen fabric, used in many Mediterranean countries and Yemen. Among other uses, they were worn, by both men and women, wrapped around the body while at the public baths in 19th-century Syria. In Algeria, conservative women wore the fouta draped over their sarouel garment. Similarly, in some parts of southern Saudi Arabia, men would wear the fouta as a loincloth beneath their thawb robes, or just by itself while relaxing at home. Foutas are widely used today in the occidental world as Turkish bath towels or even beach towels. It is also used as headwear in Somalia some examples could be the Somali aristocracy, Dubats and the general Somali male population who wear it similar to a turban.

== See also ==
- Peshtemal
