= Dishcloth =

Cloth used in the kitchen to clean or dry dishes and surfaces

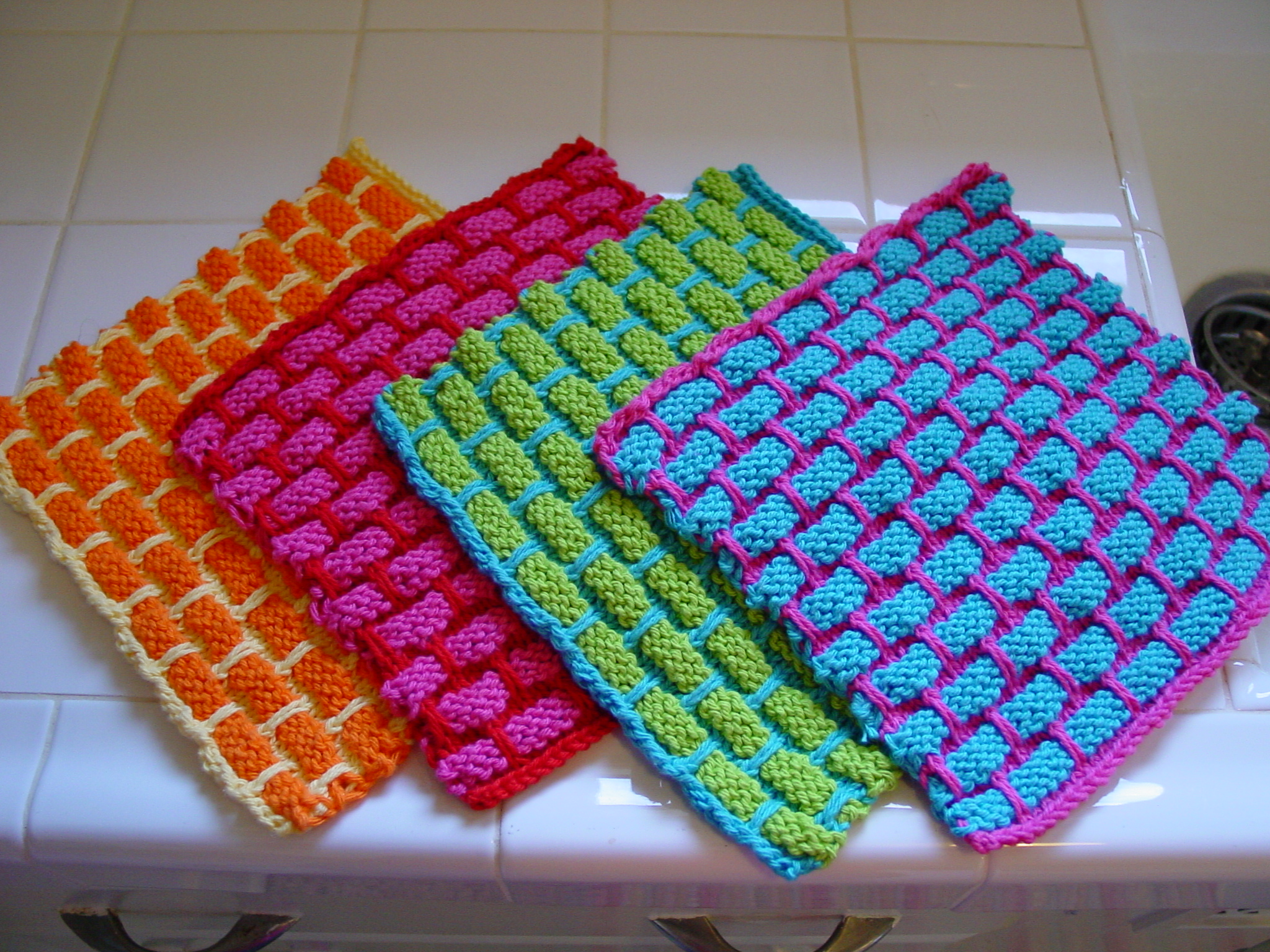
Dishcloths are typically square, and are usually made of cotton or other fibres.

A dishcloth or dishrag, also known as dishtowel (American English), is used in the kitchen to clean or dry dishes and surfaces. Dishcloths are typically made of cotton or other fibres, such as microfiber.

== Microwave disinfection ==
Dishcloths are often left damp and provide a breeding ground for bacteria. Since the kitchen sink is used to clean food, dishcloths are routinely infected with E. coli and Salmonella. In 2007, a study from the Journal of Environmental Health found that putting a damp dishcloth (or sponge) in the microwave for 2 minutes killed 99% of living pathogens. However, fire departments have subsequently warned people not to do this as it can be a fire hazard, especially if the dishcloth or sponge is not sufficiently wet. At least one small fire has occurred as a result of people following the advice from the study.
