= Glossary of textile manufacturing =

The manufacture of textiles is one of the oldest of human technologies. To make textiles, the first requirement is a source of fiber from which a yarn can be made, primarily by spinning. The yarn is processed by knitting or weaving, with color and patterns, which turns it into cloth. The machine used for weaving is the loom. For decoration, the process of coloring yarn or the finished material is dyeing. For more information of the various steps, see textile manufacturing.

== A ==
Absorbency
Absorbency is a measure of how much amount of water a fabric can absorb as well as how fast it can absorb it.
Acetate
Acetate is a synthetic fiber created from wood pulp cellulose. It is a cheaper alternative to satin and charmeuse because it is soft, luxurious, wrinkle-resistant, and drapes well. However, the fabric does melt easily.
Acrylic
Acrylic fiber is a synthetic polymer fiber that contains at least 85% acrylonitrile.
Aida cloth
Aida cloth is a coarse open-weave fabric traditionally used for cross-stitch.
Alnage
Alnage is the official supervision of the shape and quality of manufactured woolen cloth.
Alpaca
Alpaca is a name given to two distinct things:
- The wool of the Peruvian alpaca.
- A style of fabric originally made from alpaca fiber but now frequently made from a similar type of fiber.
Angora
Angora refers to the hair of the angora rabbit, or the fabric made from angora rabbit fur. (Fabric made from angora goat is mohair.)
Appliqué
Appliqué is a sewing technique in which fabric shapes, lace or trim, are sewn onto a foundation fabric to create designs.
Aramid
Aramid fiber is a fire-resistant and strong synthetic fiber.
Argyle
An argyle pattern is one containing diamonds in a sort of diagonal checkerboard pattern.

== B ==
Backstrap loom
Backstrap looms, as the name implies, are tied around the weaver's waist on one end and around a stationary object such as a tree, post, or door on the other. Tension can be adjusted simply by leaning back. Backstrap looms are very portable, since they can simply be rolled up and carried.
Baize
Baize is a coarse woollen or cotton cloth, often coloured red or green.
Ballistic nylon
Ballistic nylon is a thick, tough synthetic fabric used for a variety of applications.
Balloon
The Balloon (textile) is an oscillation pattern of the yarn while unwinding from the bobbin due to centrifugal forces.
Barathea
Barathea is an indistinct twill or broken rib – usually a twilled hopsack weave – with a fine textured, slightly pebbled surface. Often of silk or silk blended with wool, used for neckties, women's fine suits and coats, men's and women's evening wear.
Batik
Batik is an Indonesian traditional word and refers to a generic wax-resist dyeing technique used on fabric.
Bedford cord
Bedford cord is a combination of two kinds of weave, namely plain and drill. It is a durable fabric that is often used in upholstery or outerwear.
Bias
The bias direction of a piece of woven fabric, usually referred to simply as "the bias", is at 45 degrees to its warp and weft threads. Every piece of woven fabric has two biases, perpendicular to each other.
Binding
In sewing, binding is used as both a noun and a verb to refer to finishing a seam or hem of a garment, usually by rolling or pressing then stitching on an edging or trim.
Blend
A blend is yarn obtained when two or more staple fibers are combined in a textile process for producing spun yarns.
Bobbin
A bobbin is a spindle or cylinder, with or without flanges, on which wire, yarn, thread or film is wound.
Bobbin lace
Bobbin lace is a delicate lace that uses wound spools of thread (the bobbins) to weave together the shapes in the lace.
Bobbinet
Bobbinet is a tulle netting with hexagonal shaped holes, traditionally used as a base for embroidery and lingerie.
Bolt
A bolt is a standard commercial textile unit comprising a length of fabric rolled around a flat or tube. They come in widths ranging from 35-60 inches, while length varies based on type of material.
Bombazine
Bombazine is a fabric originally made of silk or silk and wool, and now also made of cotton and wool or of wool alone. It is twilled or corded and used for dress-material.
Braid
To braid is to interweave or twine three or more separate strands of one or more materials in a diagonally overlapping pattern.
Broadcloth
Broadcloth is a material of superior quality. It is a densely-woven medium weight cotton with a similar character to poplin. It is semisoft and easy to use.
Brocade
Brocade is a fabric where the patterns are woven with a supplementary weft.
Broella
Broella, from Old French:brouelle, is a type of coarse fabric that was commonly used for the everyday attire of both peasants and the monastic clergy during the Middle Ages.
Buckram
Buckram is a stiff cloth, made of cotton or linen, which is used to cover, and protect, a book, and although more expensive than its lookalike, Brella, is stronger and resistant to cockroaches eating it. Buckram can also be used to stiffen clothes.
Burlap
Burlap is a North American term for a type of cloth often used for sacks. In the UK the equivalent nomenclature is Hessian.

== C ==
Calico
Calico is a type of fabric made from unbleached, and often not fully processed, cotton. Also refers to a type of printing.
Cambric
Cambric is a lightweight cotton cloth used as fabric for lace and needlework.
Camel's hair
Camel's hair is a natural fiber from the camel. Camel hair can produce a variety of different coarseness of yarn. This fiber is a novelty fiber spun by hand-spinners.
Canvas
Canvas is an extremely heavy-duty fabric used for making sails, tents, marquees, and other functions where sturdiness is required. It is also popularly used on fashion handbags.
Canvas work
Canvas work is embroidery on canvas.
Carding
Carding is the process of removing dirt and matter and then separating the fibers and roughly aligning them so they all lie in the same direction.
Carpet
A carpet is any loom-woven, felted textile or grass floor covering.
Cashmere
Cashmere is wool from the Cashmere goat.
Cellulose
Cellulose fiber can be processed to make cellophane and rayon, and more recently Modal.
Cheesecloth
Cheesecloth is a loosewoven cotton cloth, such as is used in pressing cheese curds.
Chiffon
Chiffon is a sheer fabric made of silk or rayon.
Chino cloth
Chino cloth is a kind of twill fabric, usually made primarily from cotton.
Chintz
Chintz is calico cloth printed with flowers and other devices in different colors. It was originally of Eastern manufacture.
Coir
Coir is a coarse fiber extracted from the fibrous outer shell of a coconut.
Colorfast (colourfast)
A textile's ability to maintain its color without running or fading.
Cord
Cord is twisted fiber, usually intermediate between rope and string. It is also used as a shortened form of corduroy.
corduroy
Corduroy is a durable cloth.
cotton
Cotton is a soft fiber that grows around the seeds of the cotton plant, a shrub native to the tropical and subtropical regions of both the Old World and the New World. The fiber is most often spun into thread and used to make a soft, breathable textile.
cotton duck
Cotton duck, sometimes known as duck cloth, or simply duck, is a heavy, plain woven cotton fabric similar to canvas. It is more tightly woven than canvas and is used in a variety of applications where durability and a certain degree of water resistance is preferred.
crash
Crash is a rough fabric made from yarns that are usually undyed. The coarsest type is called Russian crash. Linen is generally used for the warp yarn, while linen and jute are used for the filler.
crepe
Crepe is a silk fabric of a gauzy texture, having a peculiar crisp or crimpy appearance.
crazy quilt
Crazy quilting is the textile art of patchworking.
crinoline
Crinoline was originally a stiff fabric with a weft of horse-hair and a warp of cotton or linen thread. The fabric first appeared around 1830.
Cross-stitch
Cross-stitch is a popular form of counted-thread embroidery in which X-shaped stitches are used to form a picture.
Crochet
Crochet is the process of creating fabric from a length of cord, yarn, or thread with a hooked tool.
Crochet hook
A crochet hook is a type of needle, usually with a hook at one end, used to draw thread through knotted loops.
Cro-hook
The cro-hook is a special double-ended crochet hook used to make double-sided crochet. Because the hook has two ends, two colours of thread can be handled at once and freely interchanged.

== D ==
damask
Damask is a fabric of silk, wool, linen, cotton, or synthetic fibers, with a pattern formed by weaving. Today, it generally denotes a linen texture richly figured in the weaving with flowers, fruit, forms of animal life, and other types of ornament.
darning mushroom
A darning mushroom is a tool which can be used for darning clothes, particularly socks. The sock can be stretched over the top of the (curved) mushroom, and gathered tightly around the stalk.
denim
Denim denotes a rugged cotton twill textile.
dimity
Dimity is a lightweight, sheer cotton fabric having at least two warp threads thrown into relief to form fine cords.
dobby loom
A dobby loom is a loom in which each harness can be manipulated individually. This is in contrast to a treadle loom, where the harnesses are attached to a number of different treadles depending on the weave structure.
double weave
Double weave is a type of advanced weave. It is done by interlacing two or more sets of warps with two or more sets of filling yarns.
dowlas
Dowlas is the name given to a plain cloth, similar to sheeting, but usually coarser.
durability
How durable a fabric or yarn is.
dyes
Dye is used to color fabric. There are two main types, natural dyes and synthetic dyes. The process is called dyeing.
dye lot
The dye lot is a number that identifies yarns dyed in the same vat at the same time. Subtle differences can appear between different batches of the same color yarn from the same manufacturer.

== E ==
eisengarn
Eisengarn, meaning "iron yarn" in English, is a light-reflecting, strong, waxed-cotton thread. It is made by soaking cotton threads in a starch, paraffin wax solution. The threads are then stretched and polished. The end result of the process is a lustrous, tear-resistant yarn which is extremely hardwearing. Invented in the 19th Century, it was further developed in 1927 by the textile designer Margaretha Reichardt at the Bauhaus for use on Marcel Breuer's tubular-steel chairs.
elasticity
Elasticity
embroidery
Embroidery is an ancient variety of decorative needlework in which designs and pictures are created by stitching strands of some material on to a layer of another material. See also: machine embroidery.
ends per inch (EPI)
Ends per inch like threads per inch is a measure of the coarseness or fineness of fabric, displaying the number of (warp) threads per inch of woven fabric.
epinglé fabric
A type of velvet fabric woven on a wire loom or épinglé loom. The épinglé velvet is notable in that both a loop pile and a cut pile can be integrated into the same fabric. The art of épinglé weaving in Europe originated from Lucca (Italy) and later came to Venice and Genua, which is where the term Genua velvet comes from. The technique of épinglé weaving is still used today in the Flemish region of Kortrijk and Waregem. The fabric finds it application mostly in upholstery, although in medieval times it was used as apparel for princes and kings as well as for bishops, cardinals, and the Pope.
epinglé loom
A kind of weaving machine whereby steel rods are inserted in a top shed which is formed over the bottom shed in which the weft is inserted. The steel rods are inserted into the fabric every second or third pick by a separate mechanism that is synchronised with the weaving motion. The same mechanism also extracts the rods from the fabric. If the rod carries a cutting blade at the tip the warps that are woven over the rods are cut, creating a cut pile effect. In case the rod has no blade, then the warp ends from a loop pile. Alternating cut and loop wires create cut and loop pile in the fabric. This weaving technology is used for weaving velvets for furnishing and apparel applications. These fabrics are known as 'moquette' or "épinglé' fabrics. This kind of weaving machine is also used for weaving carpets where it is known as a 'Wilton loom'.
even-weave
Even-weave or evenweave fabric is used in counted-thread embroidery and is characterized by Warp and weft threads of the same size.
eyelet
Grommets and eyelets are metal, plastic, or rubber rings that are inserted into a hole made through another material. They may be used to reinforce the hole, to shield something from the sharp edges of the hole, or both.

== F ==
facing
Facing
felt
Felt is a non-woven cloth that is produced by matting, condensing and pressing fibers. The fibers form the structure of the fabric.
felting
The process of making felt is called felting.
fiber
Fiber is a class of materials that are continuous filaments or are in discrete elongated pieces, similar to pieces of thread. Fibers are often used in the manufacture of other materials. They can be spun into filaments, thread, or rope. They can be used as a component of composite materials. They can also be matted into sheets to make products such as paper or felt.
fil coupé

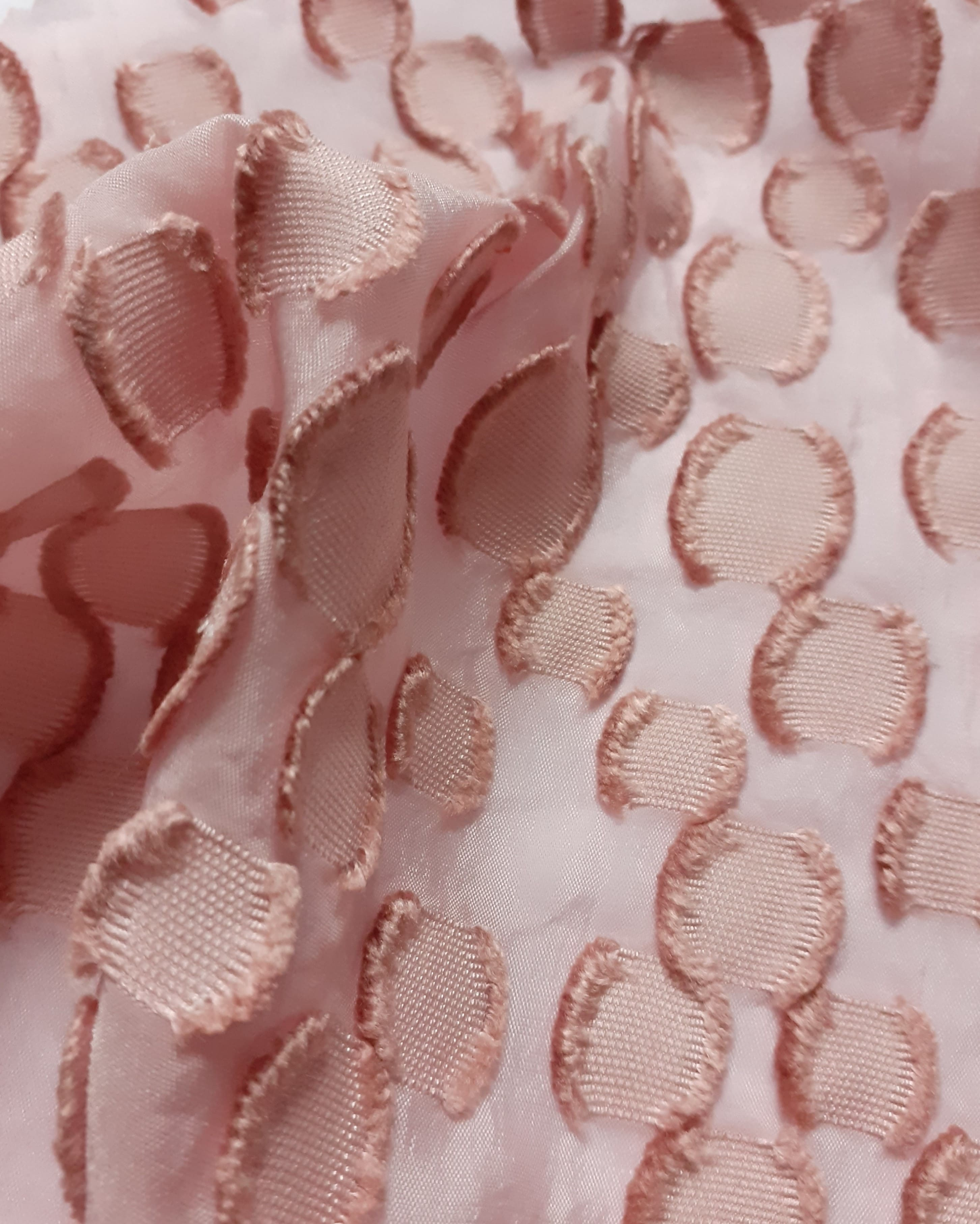
Round fil coupé elements on a sheer fabric

Fil coupé, from the French "cut thread", is a technique in which an additional set of weft yarns is added to create floating decorative elements on the textile’s surface, the threads of which are cut after weaving.
filament
A filament is a fine, thinly spun thread, fiber, or wire.
filling
See Weft
finishing
Finishing refers to any process performed on yarn or fabric after weaving to improve the look, performance, or "hand" (feel) of the finished textile.
fishnet
Fishnet is a material with an open, diamond shaped knit.
flannel
Flannel is a cloth that is commonly used to make clothing and bedsheets. It is usually made from either wool, wool and cotton, or wool and synthetic fabric.
flax
Flax fiber is soft, lustrous and flexible. It is stronger than cotton fiber but less elastic. The best grades are used for linen fabrics such as damasks, lace and sheeting. Coarser grades are used for the manufacturing of twine and rope.
frieze
Frieze is a coarse woollen cloth with a nap on one side, that was raised by scrubbing it to raise curls of fiber (French: frisé). In the 19th century rough cheap frieze was made of wool mixed with shoddy (see Shoddy).
fulling
Fulling is a step in clothmaking which involves the cleansing of cloth (particularly wool) to get rid of oils, dirt, and other impurities.
fustian
Fustian is a type of heavy twilled woven cotton fabrics, chiefly prepared for menswear. Usually dyed in a dark shade. Declined in popularity from 1813, being replaced by harder wearing and better quality wool cloths.

== G ==
gabardine
Gabardine is a tough, tightly woven fabric often used to make suits, overcoats and trousers. The fiber used to make the fabric is traditionally worsted (a woolen yarn), but may also be cotton, synthetic or mixed. The fabric is smooth on one side and has a diagonally ribbed surface on the other.
gauge
A gauge is a set number of rows per inch (in knitting) or the thread-count of a woven fabric that helps the knitter determine whether they have the right size knitting needles or a weaver if the cloth is tight enough.
ganté
Ganté is a cloth made from cotton or tow warp and jute weft. It is largely used for bags for sugar and similar material, and has the appearance of a fine hessian cloth.
gauze
Gauze is a very light, sheer, fine woven fabric.
Genova velvet
A type of velvet where in Jacquard patterns are woven into the ground fabric and where the pile is made of a combination of cut and uncut (loop) pile. This fabric is also known as Venetian velvet, or more generally, as épinglé velvet. In the actual terminology of furnishing fabrics it is mostly named with its French name velours de Gênes. This kind of fabric is made on a wire loom or épinglé loom.
geotextile
A geotextile is a synthetic permeable textile.
gingham
Gingham is a fabric made from dyed cotton yarn.
glass fiber
Fiberglass is material made from extremely fine fibers of glass. It is widely used in the manufacture of insulation and textiles.
gossamer
A gossamer is a very light, sheer, gauze-like fabric, popular for white wedding dresses and decorations.
grogram
Grogram, also known as grosgrain, is a coarse fabric of silk mixed with wool or with mohair and often stiffened with gum.

== H ==
hand
The hand of a fabric is how it feels to the touch.
heald
A heald is a loom component also called heddle or harness, used to separate warp yarns for passage of the weft. Commonly made of cord or wire. Minimum two healds are required to weave a fabric with warp and weft in a loom.
heddle
A heddle is a common loom component, used to separate warp yarns for passage of the weft. Commonly made of cord or wire.
hem
1. To hem a piece of cloth (in sewing), a garment worker folds up a cut edge, folds it up again, and then sews it down. The process of hemming thus completely encloses the cut edge in cloth, so that it cannot ravel.
2. The edge of cloth hemmed in this manner.
hemp
The main uses of hemp fiber are rope, sacking, carpet, nets and webbing. Hemp is also being used in increasing quantities in paper manufacturing. The cellulose content is about 70%.
Holland cloth
Holland cloth (or Holland) – one of different types of plain linen or cotton fabric, sometimes glazed.
huckaback
Huckaback is a type of coarse absorbent cotton or linen fabric used for making towels.

== I ==
ikat
Ikat is a style of weaving that uses a tie-dye process on either the warp or weft before the threads are woven to create a pattern or design. A double ikat is when both the warp and the weft are tie-dyed before weaving.
intarsia
Intarsia is a knitting technique used to create patterns with multiple colours.
interfacing
A type of material used on the unseen or "wrong" side of fabrics in sewing.

== J ==
Jacquard
1. The fabric made on a Jacquard loom.
2. The attachment for a hand loom or power loom that allows warp threads to be individually controlled. This enables the production of Jacquard fabric.
Jacquard loom
The Jacquard loom was the first machine to use punched cards. It uses punched cards to control the pattern being woven. It is a form of dobby loom, where individual harnesses can be raised and lowered independently.
jamdani
Jamdani is a kind of fine cloth made in Bangladesh.
jute
Jute is a long, soft, shiny plant fiber that can be spun into coarse, strong threads. Jute is one of the cheapest natural fibers, and is second only to cotton in amount produced and variety of uses. Jute fibers are composed primarily of the plant materials cellulose and lignin.

== K ==
knitting
Knitting is the process of inter-looping of yarns or inter-meshing of loops.
knit fabrics
Knit fabrics are fabrics that were produced through the process of knitting.
knitting needle gauge
A knitting needle gauge is used to determine the size of a knitting needle. Some also double for crochet hooks. Most needles come with the size written on the needle, but many needles (like double-pointed needles) tend to not be labeled. Also, with wear and time the label often wears off. Needle gauges can be made of any material, and are often made for metal and plastic. They tend to be about 3 by 5 inches. They contain holes of various sizes, and often have a ruler along the edge for determining the gauge of a sample.

== L ==
lace
The creation of lace is an ancient craft. A lace fabric is lightweight openwork fabric, patterned, either by machine or by hand, with open holes in the work. The holes can be formed via removal of threads or cloth from a previously woven fabric, but more often lace is built up from a single thread and the open spaces are created as part of the lace fabric.
lamé
Lamé is a type of brocaded clothing fabric with inwoven metal threads, typically of gold or silver, giving it a metallic sheen.
lawn
Lawn is a fine linen or cotton cloth.
linen
Linen is a material made from the fibers of the flax plant. Linens are fabric household goods, such as pillowcases and towels, many of which were historically made from linen cloth.
lining
Lining
loden
Loden is water-resistant material for clothing made from sheep wool.
loft
An indication of thickness of a textile when not under compression. High loft implies that the fabric contains more air than fibres, has a low overall density and is likely to be a good insulator due to a large volume of constrained air.
loom
A loom is a machine used for weaving fabric.
lucet
Lucet is a method of cordmaking or braiding which is believed to date back to the Viking Age. Lucet cord is square, strong, and slightly springy. It closely resembles knitted I-cord or the cord produced on a knitting spool. Lucet cord is formed by a series of loops, and will therefore unravel if cut.

== M ==
macramé
Macramé (also macrame) is a form of textile-making using knotting rather than weaving or knitting. Its primary knots are the square knot and forms of hitching (full hitch and double half hitches).
mercerized cotton
Mercerization is a treatment for cotton fabric and thread mostly employed to give cotton a lustrous appearance.
merino
Merino is the Spanish name for a breed of sheep, and hence applied to a woolen fabric.
mesh
A mesh is similar to fabric or a web in that it has many connected or weaved pieces. In clothing, a mesh is often defined as fabric that has a large number of closely spaced holes, such as is common practice for modern sports jerseys.
metallic fiber
Metallic fibers are fibers used in textiles which are either composed of metal, or fibers of other materials with a metal coating. Their uses include decoration and the reduction of static electricity.
Microfiber
Fibers with strands thinner than one denier. Fabrics made with microfibers are exceptionally soft and hold their shape well.
millinery
1. Millinery the profession or business of designing, making, or selling hats for women.
2. Women's hats and other articles sold by a milliner.
mockado
Mockado is a woollen pile fabric made in imitation of silk velvet.
modal
Modal is a cellulose fiber made by spinning reconstituted cellulose from beech trees.
mohair
Mohair is a silk-like fabric made from the hair of the Angora goat. It is durable, light and warm, although some people find it uncomfortably itchy.
mungo
Fibrous woollen material generated from waste fabric, particularly tightly woven cloths and rags. See also shoddy.
muslin
Muslin is a type of finely woven cotton fabric, introduced to Europe from the Middle East in the 17th century. It was named for the city where it was first made, Mosul in what is now Iraq.

== N ==
nainsook
Nainsook is a fine, soft muslin fabric, often used to make babies clothing.
nap
Nap is the raised surface of certain cloth, such as flannel.
needlepoint
Needlepoint is a form of canvas work created on a mesh canvas. The stitching threads used may be wool, silk, or rarely cotton. Stitches may be plain, covering just one mesh intersection with a single orientation, or fancy, such as Bargello. Plain stitches, known as Tent stitches, may be worked as basketweave or half cross.
needlework
Needlework is another term for the handicraft of decorative sewing and textile arts. Anything that uses a needle for construction can be called needlework.
net
Net is a device made by fibers woven in a grid-like structure, as in fishing net, a soccer goal, a butterfly net, or the court divider in tennis.
non-woven fabric
Non-woven textiles are those which are neither woven nor knit, for example felt. Non-wovens are typically not strong (unless reinforced by a backing), and do not stretch. They are cheap to manufacture.
novelty yarn
Novelty yarn.
nylon
Nylon is a synthetic polymer, a plastic. Nylon fibers are used to make many synthetic fabrics and women's stockings.

== O ==
oil cloth
Oil cloth was, traditionally, heavy cotton or linen cloth with a linseed oil coating: it was semi-waterproof. The most familiar use was for brightly printed kitchen tablecloths. Dull-colored oilcloth was used for bedrolls, sou'westers, and tents. By the late 1950s, oilcloth became a synonym for vinyl (polyvinyl chloride) bonded to either a flanneled cloth or a printed vinyl with a synthetic non-woven backing.
organdy
Organdy or organdie is the sheerest cotton cloth made. Combed yarns contribute to its appearance. Its sheerness and crispness are the result of an acid finish on greige (unbleached) lawn goods. Because of its stiffness and fiber content, it is very prone to wrinkling.
organza
Organza is a thin, plain weave, sheer fabric traditionally made from silk, the continuous filament of silkworms. Nowadays, though many organzas are woven with synthetic filament fibers such as polyester or nylon, the most luxurious organzas are still woven in silk.

== P ==
paisley
Paisley is a droplet-shaped vegetal motif, similar to half of the taijitu symbol, the Indian bodhi tree leaf, or the mango tree. The design originated in India and spread to Scotland when British soldiers brought home cashmere shawls.
pashmina
Pashmina is the fiber obtained from pasmina goats in kashmir region, used for winter clothes and shawls.
patchwork
Patchwork is a form of needlework or craft that involves sewing together small pieces of fabric and stitching them together into a larger design, which is then usually quilted, or else tied together with pieces of yarn at regular intervals, a practice known as tying. Patchwork is traditionally 'pieced' by hand, but modern quiltmakers often use a sewing machine instead.
percale
Percale refers to a closely woven, high thread count, cotton fabric often used for sheets and clothing.
Persian weave
Persian weave is a method of weave used in jewelry and other art forms.
pile knit
Pile knit
pile weave
Pile weave
pile wire
A steel rod which is inserted in between the base fabric and the pile ends in a pile fabric woven on a wire loom or épinglé loom. The height and thickness of the rod determine the size of the loop. A pile wire can be a simple rod – in which case the pile yarns will form a 'loop' pile. If the pile wire is equipped with a blade holder and cutting blade at the tip it will cut the pile loops during extraction thus producing cut pile.
pill
Pill
plaid
From a Scots language word meaning blanket, plaid usually referring to patterned woollen cloth otherwise known as tartan.
plain weave
Plain weave
plied yarn
Plied yarn is yarn that has been plied, with the process called plying.
plush
Plush is a fabric having a cut nap or pile the same as fustian or velvet.
polyester
Polyester is a synthetic fiber.
poplin
Poplin is a heavy, durable fabric that has a ribbed appearance. It is made with wool, cotton, silk, rayon, or any mixture of these. The ribs run across the fabric from selvage to selvage. They are formed by using coarse filling yarns in a plain weave.
punched
A type of fabric structure that gives different holes or figured textures.
purl stitch
A commonly used stitch in knitting.

== Q ==
qalamkari
Qalamkari (also kalamkari) is a type of hand-painted or block-printed textile, produced in various places in India.
qiviut
Qiviut is the wool of the musk ox.
quilt
Quilting is a method of sewing or tying two layers of cloth with a layer of insulating batting in between. A bed covering or similar large rectangular piece of quilting work is called a quilt.

== R ==
rayon
Rayon is a fiber made of processed cellulose. Cellulose fibers from wood or cotton are dissolved in alkali to make a solution called viscose, which is then extruded through a nozzle, or spinneret, into an acid bath to reconvert the viscose into cellulose. A similar process, using a slit instead of a hole, is used to make cellophane.
rib knit
Rib knit
rolag
A rolag is a loose woolen roll of fibers that results from using handcards.
roving
A roving is a long rope of fibers where all of the fibers have been carded to lie parallel to each another.
rug
A rug is a form of carpet. It is usually smaller than a carpet. See also: rug making

== S ==
sailcloth
Sailcloth
sateen
Sateen is a fabric formed with a satin weave with weft floats
satin
A satin is a cloth that typically has a glossy surface and a dull back. It is formed by a sequence of broken twill floats in either the warp or weft direction, which respectively identify the goods as either a satin or a sateen.
satin weave
A satin is a broken twill weaving technique that forms floats on one side of the fabric. If a satin is woven with the floats parallel to the selvedge of the goods, the corresponding fabric is termed a "satin." If the floats are perpendicular to the selvedge of the goods, the fabric is termed a 'sateen.'"
seam
A seam, in sewing, is the line where two pieces of fabric are held together by thread.
seam ripper
A seam ripper is a small tool used for unpicking stitches.
selvage
The selvage (also selvedge) is the woven edges of a fabric that lie parallel to the warp.
serge
Serge is a type of twill fabric that has diagonal lines or ridges on both sides, made with a two-up, two-down weave. The worsted variety is used in making military uniforms, suits, great and trench coats. Its counterpart, silk serge, is used for linings. French serge is a softer, finer variety. The word is also used for a high quality woolen woven.
serging
Serging is the binding off of an edge of cloth.
sewing
Sewing is an ancient craft involving the stitching of cloth, leather, animal skins, furs, or other materials, using needle and thread. Its use is nearly universal among human populations and dates back to Paleolithic times (30,000 BC). Sewing predates the weaving of cloth.
shag
Shag (fabric) is typically used to make a deep-pile carpets. This is the oldest use of the term. Shag carpet is sometimes evoked as an example of the aesthetic from the culture of the U.S. 1970s. Also used to make carpets for mariners.
shed
In weaving, the shed is the gap between warp yarns on a loom when one or more, but not all, of the harnesses are raised.
sheer
Sheer is a semi-transparent and flimsy cloth.
shoddy
Recycled or remanufactured wool. Historically generated from loosely woven materials. Benjamin Law invented shoddy and mungo, as such, in England in 1813. He was the first to organise, on a larger scale, the activity of taking old clothes and grinding them down into a fibrous state that could be re-spun into yarn. The shoddy industry was centred on the towns of Batley, Morley, Dewsbury and Ossett in West Yorkshire, and concentrated on the recovery of wool from rags. The importance of the industry can be gauged by the fact that even in 1860 the town of Batley was producing over 7,000 tonnes of shoddy. At the time there were 80 firms employing a total of 550 people sorting the rags. These were then sold to shoddy manufacturers of which there were about 130 in the West Riding. Shoddy is inferior to the original wool. "Shoddy" has come to mean "of poor quality" in general (not just clothing), and the original meaning is largely obsolete.
shot
The opal effect achieved on a fabric by dyeing the warp and weft threads different colours. The yarns are dyed first and then woven. When looking at the fabric from various angles it appears to alter in colour, this is more obvious in lustrous fabrics and more so in certain types of weaves.
shuttle
A shuttle in weaving is a device used with a loom that is thrown or passed back and forth between the threads of the warp to weave in the weft.
silk
Silk is a natural protein fiber that can be woven into textiles. It is obtained from the cocoon of the silkworm larva, in the process known as sericulture, which kills the larvae. The shimmering appearance for which it is prized comes from the fiber's triangular prism-like structure, which allows silk cloth to refract incoming light at different angles.
sisal
Sisal or sisal hemp is an agave Agave sisalana that yields a stiff fiber used in making rope. (The term may refer either to the plant or the fiber, depending on context.) It is not really a variety of hemp, but named so because hemp was for centuries a major source for fiber, so other fibers were sometimes named after it.
skein
Skein is when a length of yarn is bundled in a loose roll rather than put on a cone (as you would purchase from store)- usually done if yarn is going to a dye vat or needs a treatment in a manufacturing/knitting mill environment.
solution-dyed
Solution-dyed
soufflé
A trade name applied to lightweight textiles, particularly sheer silk (soufflé de soie) or warp-knitted material used in eveningwear and theatrical costumes. Textile dictionaries also record the name for a loose, soft and spongy novelty fabric made from wool, rayon or silk.
spandex fiber
Spandex or elastane is a synthetic fiber known for its exceptional elasticity (stretchability). It is stronger and more durable than rubber, its major plant competitor. It was invented in 1959 by DuPont, and when first introduced it revolutionised many areas of the clothing industry.
spinning
Spinning is the process of creating yarn (or thread, rope, cable) from various raw fiber materials.
spread tow fabric
Spread tow fabric is a type of lightweight fabric. Its production involves the steps of spreading a tow of higher count, e.g. 12k, into thin-and-wide spread tow tape (STT) and weaving them into a lightweight fabric by employing the novel tape-weaving technique.
staple
Staple is the raw material, or its length and quality, of fiber from which textiles are made.
stitch
A stitch is a single turn or loop of the thread or yarn in sewing, knitting and embroidery.
stuff
Stuff is a coarse cloth, sometimes made with a linen warp and worsted weft.
super
The super grading system is used to grade the quality of wool fabric. The higher the number, the more yarn is packed in per square inch, therefore all things being equal a super 120s yarn is better than super 100s.
spun
See spinning

== T ==
tablet weaving
Tablet weaving is a process of weaving where tablets, also called 'cards', are used to create the shed that the weft is passed through. It is generally used to make narrow work such as belts or straps.
Tactel
Tactel is the brand name of a man-made fiber made from nylon.
taffeta
Taffeta is a type of fabric, often used for fancy dresses.
tapestry
Tapestry is a form of textile art. It is woven by hand on a weaving-loom. The chain thread is the carrier in which the coloured striking thread is woven. In this way, a colourful pattern or image is created. Most weavers use a naturally based chain thread made out of linen or wool. The striking threads can be made out of silk, wool, gold or silver, but can also be made out of any form of textile.
tarlatan
Tarlatan (also tarlaton) is a starched, open-weave fabric, much like cheesecloth. In printmaking, it can be used to wipe the ink off a plate during the intaglio inking process. The open weave allows for the tarlatan to pick up a large quantity of ink. The stiffness imparted by the starch helps prevent the fabric from taking the ink out of the incised lines.
tassel
A tassel is a ball-shaped bunch of plaited or otherwise entangled threads from which at one end protrudes a cord on which the tassel is hung, and which may have loose, dangling threads at the other end.
tatting
Tatting is a technique for handcrafting lace that can be documented approximately to the early 19th century.
terry cloth
Terry cloth is a type of cloth with loops sticking out. Most bath towels are examples of terry cloth.
thimble
A thimble is a protective shield worn on the finger or thumb.
threads per inch (TPI)
Threads per inch is the measurement of the number of threads per inch of material, such as fabric, or metal in the case of screws and bolts.
thread count
The thread count is the number of warp threads per inch plus the number of weft threads.
tissue
Tissue is a fine woven fabric or gauze.
trim
Trim or trimming in clothing and home decorating is applied ornament such as gimp, passementerie, ribbon, ruffles, or, as a verb, to apply such ornament.
tulle
Tulle is a netting, which is often starched, made of various fibers, including silk, nylon, and rayon, that is most commonly used for veils, gowns (particularly wedding gowns) and ballet tutus.
tweed
Tweed is a type of fabric using the twill weave.
twill tape
Twill tape is a flat twill-woven ribbon of cotton, linen, polyester, or wool.
twill weave
Twill is a type of fabric woven with a pattern of diagonal parallel ribs. It is made by passing the weft threads over one warp thread and then under two or more warp threads. Examples of twill fabric are gabardine, tweed and serge.

== V ==
velour
Velour is a textile, a knitted counterpart of velvet. It combines the stretchy properties of knits such as spandex with the rich appearance and feel of velvet.
velvet
Velvet is a type of tufted fabric in which the cut threads are very evenly distributed, with a short dense pile, giving it its distinct feel. Velvet can be made from any fiber. It is woven on a special loom that weaves two piece of velvet at the same time. The two pieces are then cut apart and the two lengths of fabric are wound on separate take-up rolls.
velveteen
Velveteen is a cotton cloth made in imitation of velvet. The term is sometimes applied to a mixture of silk and cotton. Some velveteens are a kind of fustian, having a rib of velvet pile alternating with a plain depression. The velveteen, trade varies a good deal with the fashions that control the production of velvet.
viscose
Viscose is an artificial cellulose-based polymer, sometimes used as a synonym for Rayon.

== W ==
warp
The warp is the set of lengthwise threads attached to a loom before weaving begins, and through which the weft is woven. The warp threads run vertically.
warp knit
Warp knit
waterproof
Waterproof
water repellent
Water repellent
weaving
Weaving is an ancient textile art and craft that involves placing two sets of threads or yarn made of fiber called the warp and weft of the loom and turning them into cloth. This cloth can be plain (in one color or a simple pattern), or it can be woven in decorative or artistic designs, including tapestries.
weft
The weft is the yarn that is woven back and forth through the warp to make cloth. This set of yarn or thread is also known as the filling.
weft knit
Weft knit
Wilton Carpet
Wilton carpet is produced on a specific type of weaving machine called wire loom. Wilton carpets are pile carpets whereby the pile is formed by inserting steel rods in the pile warps of the fabric. After extraction of the rods the pile is looped (in case straight wires have been used) or cut (in case cutting wires are used). Wilton carpet is generally considered as high quality and is used for heavy duty applications. It is named after Wilton, Wiltshire.
wire loom
Weaving machine for pile fabrics or velvets whereby the pile is made by weaving steel rods or wires into the fabrics. When the wires are extracted the warp ends that have been woven over the wires remain as loops on top of the fabric or will form cut pile if the wire is equipped with a cutting blade. This technique is also known as "épinglé weaving". A wire loom in a much wider version (up to 5 meters of width) and in heavier construction is used for the manufacturing of carpets is called a "WILTON" loom, and the carpets made on such a loom are known as "Wilton Carpets".
woof
Another term for weft.
wool
Wool is the fiber derived from the hair of domesticated animals, usually sheep.
woolen
Woolen or woollen is a yarn and cloth usually made from wool.
worsted fabric
Worsted is a yarn and cloth usually made from wool. The yarn is well twisted and spun of long staple wool (though nowadays also medium and short fibers are used). The wool is combed so that the fibers lie parallel.
woven fabric
A woven fabric is a cloth formed by weaving. It only stretches in the bias directions (between the warp and weft directions), unless the threads are elastic. Woven cloth usually frays at the edges, unless measures are taken to counter this, such as the use of pinking shears or hemming.

== Y ==
yarn
Yarn is a long continuous length of interlocked fibers, suitable for use in the production of textiles, sewing, crocheting, knitting, weaving and ropemaking. Yarn can be made from any number of synthetic or natural fibers.

== Z ==
zibeline
Zibeline is a thick, soft fabric with a long nap.
