= Heald =

Heald is a surname. Notable people with the surname include:

- Anthony Heald (born 1944), American actor
- Brad Heald (born 1983), Australian bass guitarist
- Chloe Heald, British TV personality and Playboy model
- Clare Heald (1895–1973), English jockey
- Glen Heald (born 1967), Australian guitarist, songwriter and producer
- Greg Heald (born 1971), English footballer
- Henry Townley Heald (1904–1975), American university president
- John Heald (born 1965), English banker and blogger, cruise director of Carnival Cruise Lines
- Lionel Heald (1897–1981), British barrister and politician
- Mike Heald, American soccer midfielder
- Nathan Heald (1775–1832), American US Army officer
- Oliver Heald (born 1954), British barrister and politician
- Ollie Heald (born 1975), Canadian soccer player
- Paul Heald (born 1968), English footballer
- Frederick De Forest Heald (1872-1954), mycologist with the standard author abbreviation "Heald"
- Tim Heald (1944–2016), British author, biographer, journalist and public speaker
- William H. Heald (1864–1939), American banker, lawyer and politician
- Paul J. Heald (born 1959), American novelist and law professor

== See also ==
- Heald College, for-profit, business-career college with multiple campuses in the Western United States
- Heald Green, in Greater Manchester, England
- Heald Island, island east of Walcott Bay, Victoria Land
- Heald Stream Falls, waterfall in Maine, United States
- Healdton, Oklahoma, a city
- Heddle, a part of a loom also known as a heald
