= Butcher's linen =

Strong heavy linen cloth, primarily used for butchers' aprons

Butcher's linen (Butcher linen) was a strong heavy linen cloth. It was a strong and durable fabric used primarily for butchers' aprons.

== Weave ==
It was a plain weave fabric made with coarse linen yarns. The fabric was rough, stiff and heavy. Linen was mostly used for Butcher's Linen due to its simple washability, but cotton was also used in some cases.

== Use ==
Butcher's linen was initially used for aprons of waitresses and butchers jackets, and later used as a dress material and backing for starched shirt fronts.
