= Carnival Splendor =

Concordia-class cruise ship

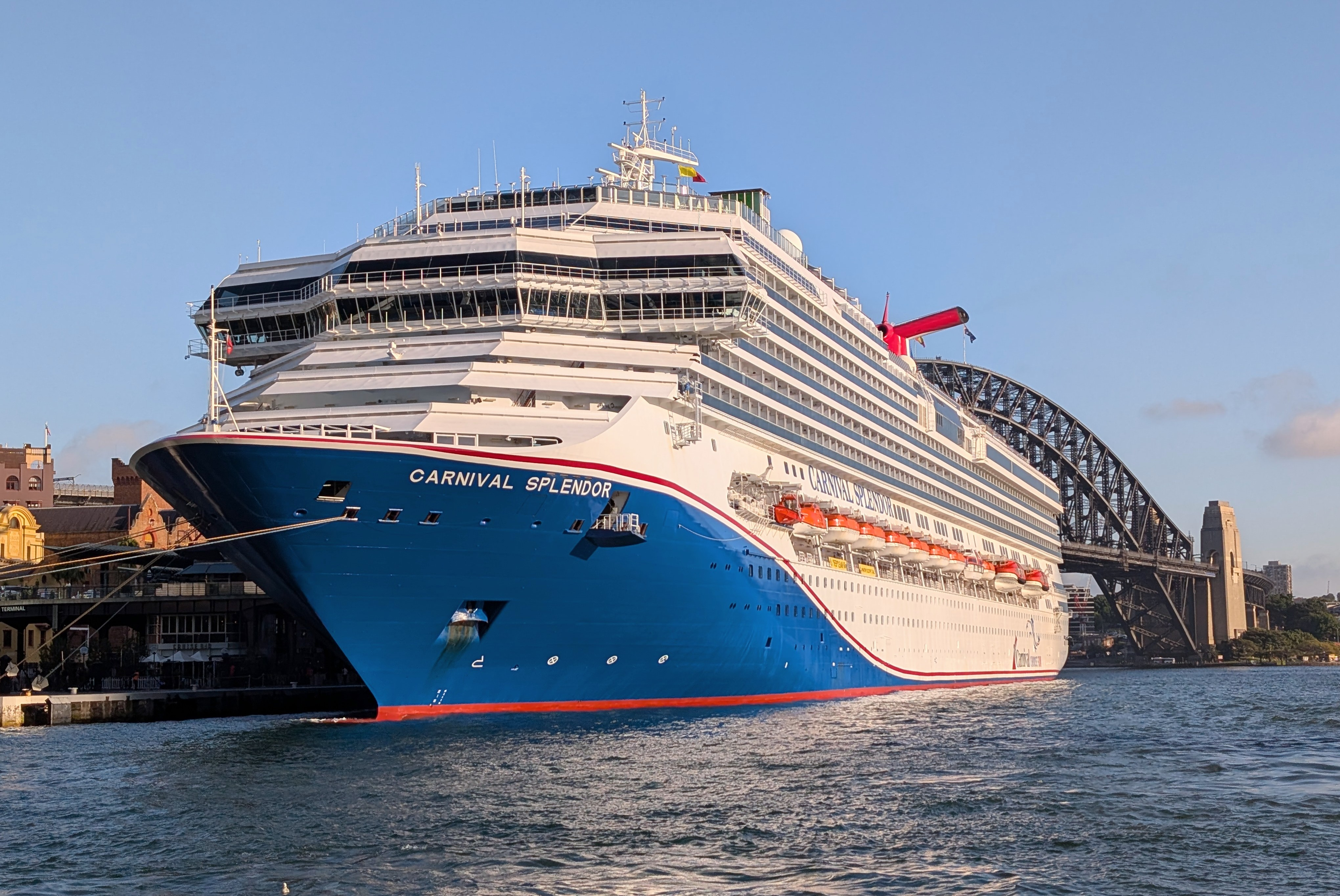
- Carnival Splendor at Sydney, Australia, 2025

History

Panama
- Name: Carnival Splendor
- Owner: Carnival Corporation & plc
- Operator: Carnival Cruise Line
- Port of registry: Panama
- Route: Various (2008-2022); Australia (2022-present)
- Ordered: 2006
- Builder: Fincantieri, Sestri Ponente, Italy
- Cost: US$697 million
- Yard number: 6135
- Laid down: 2007
- Launched: 3 August 2007
- Christened: 10 July 2008
- Completed: 28 June 2008
- Maiden voyage: 2 July 2008
- Identification: Call sign: 3EUS; IMO number: 9333163; MMSI no.: 372808000

General characteristics
- Class & type: Concordia-class cruise ship
- Tonnage: 113,300 GT; 83,320 NT; 11,843 DWT
- Length: 290 m (950 ft)
- Beam: 35.54 m (116.6 ft)
- Draught: 8.3 m (27 ft)
- Decks: 13
- Installed power: 6 × Wärtsilä 12V46C (6 × 12,600 kW)
- Propulsion: Diesel-electric; two shafts; Converteam propulsion motors (2 × 21 MW)
- Speed: 21 knots (39 km/h; 24 mph)
- Capacity: 3,012 passengers
- Crew: 1,150

Carnival Splendor is a Concordia-class cruise ship operated by Carnival Cruise Line. As she is the only Concordia-class ship in the Carnival fleet, she is also referred to as a Splendor-class ship, and she has a different funnel design compared to her other sister ships which belonged to the Costa Crociere fleet. The ship was originally designed and ordered for Costa Cruises but she was transferred to Carnival Cruise Line during construction.

The 113,323 gross tonnage (GT) ship entered service on 2 July 2008 as the largest Carnival ship until Carnival Dream debuted in September 2009.

== Christening ==
Carnival Splendor's godmother is Myleene Klass, who on 10 July 2008 christened the vessel in Dover in a ceremony where she played Sailing on the piano, while a Royal Navy diver climbed up five decks on a rope, and broke the bottle of champagne on the bow by hand.

== Service history ==
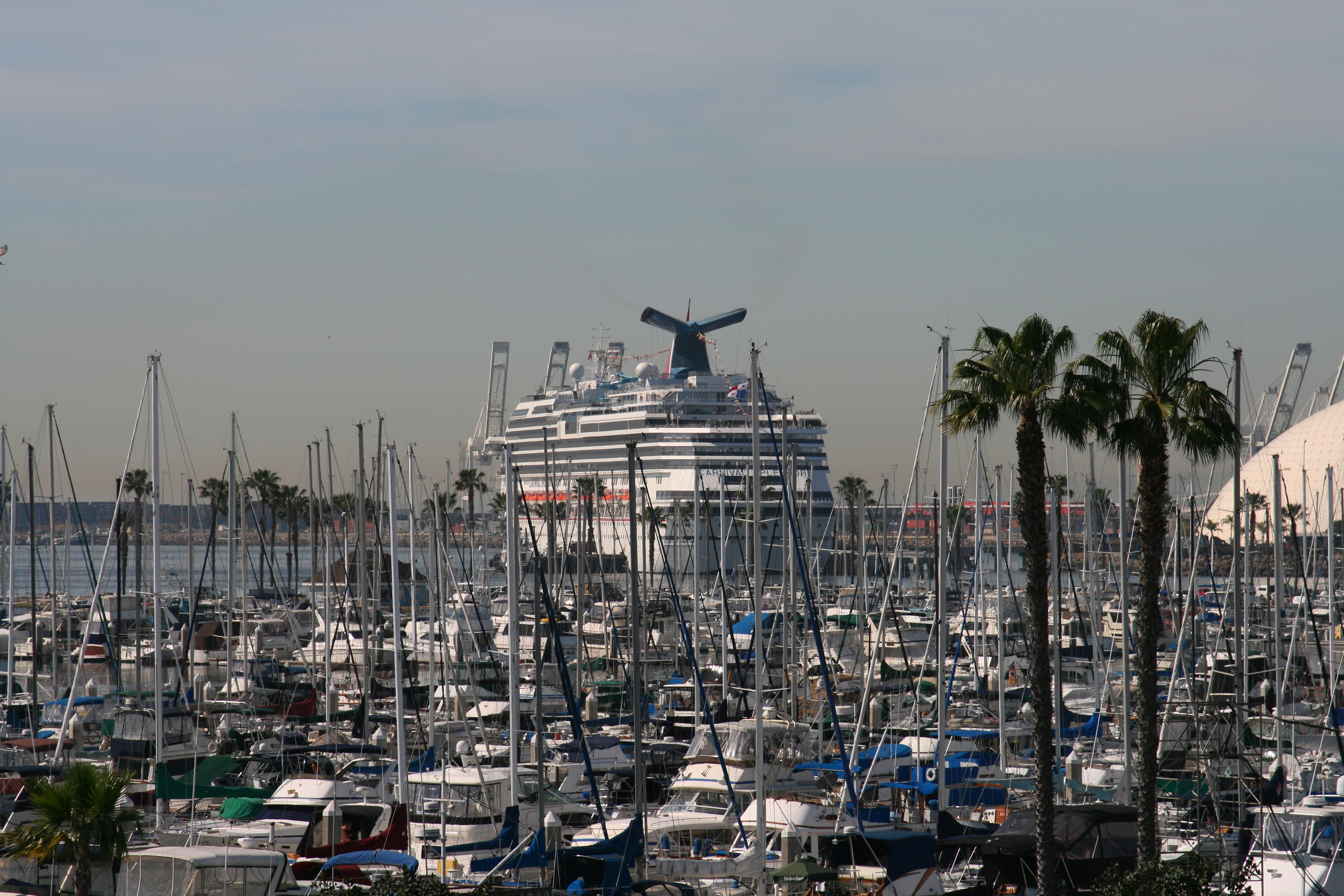
Carnival Splendor in Port of Long Beach, California, 2009

Carnival Splendor's inaugural season began on 2 July 2008 with a cruise from Genoa, Italy to Dover, England, followed by cruises to Northern European ports. On 3 November 2008 she transited to Fort Lauderdale, Florida.

=== Fire ===
In January 2009, Carnival Splendor moved to Long Beach, California, a journey which took 49 days. The ship's post-Panamax size made it too wide to navigate the Panama Canal at the time, so it made the journey by sailing around Cape Horn. It was the first Carnival ship to have ever made this voyage. From Long Beach, she sailed year-round cruises to Mexico. In March, Carnival Splendor was the host ship for "Mayercraft Carrier 2", a four-day cruise from 27 to 31 March, from Los Angeles to Cabo San Lucas, Mexico hosted by musician John Mayer and featuring music and comedy shows.

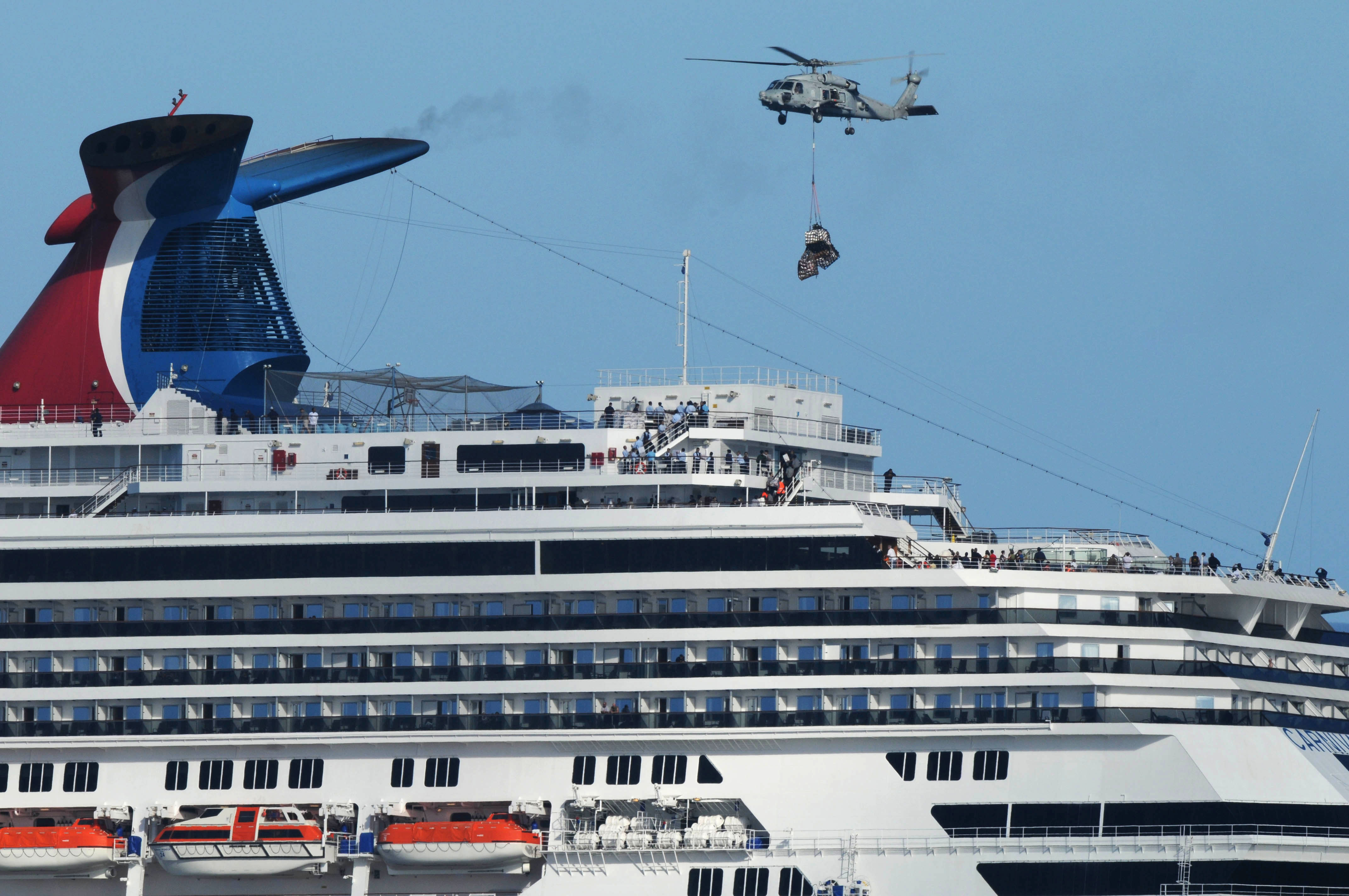
a U.S. Navy helicopter delivering supplies to Carnival Splendor

On 8 November 2010, at approximately 06:00 Pacific Time, on the second day of a voyage from Long Beach to the Mexican Riviera, the ship experienced a catastrophic failure of the No. 5 diesel generator which started a fire in her aft engine room. The fire spread to the overhead electrical cable runs in the aft engine room. The fire in the cable runs caused extensive damage to the cabling and contributed to the ship losing all electrical power. According to Carnival president, Gerry Cahill, a "crankcase split, and that's what caused the fire", adding it was isolated to the aft generator room. The fire was extinguished by the afternoon, and no one was injured. Nearly 4,500 passengers and crew members were on board at the time.

The crew was unable to restore power to the engines, and the ship was towed by tugboat to San Diego. Without power for air conditioning and refrigeration, passengers were fed rations delivered via U.S. Navy helicopters from the aircraft carrier USS Ronald Reagan. Splendor was escorted by, and received aid and security assistance from the U.S. Coast Guard Cutter Morgenthau. Carnival Splendor arrived in San Diego under tow around sunrise on 11 November, and docked around noon. Carnival promised to refund all passengers for ticket and travel expenses along with a voucher for a free cruise of equal value to their cruise on Carnival Splendor.

The ship has three 12-cylinder Wärtsilä 12V46C medium-speed diesel generating sets in the aft engine room and three in a forward engine room. Each generator is connected to two switchboards. The failure of a single engine or generator should not normally cause a total power loss. Clark Dodge, former chief engineer for Washington State Ferries, said, "If things were designed properly, all the power shouldn't have gone out."

The investigation into the fire was carried out by the United States Coast Guard in conjunction with the Panamanian Maritime Authority. The report into the cause of the fire was released on 15 July 2013.

=== Return to service ===
The ship returned to service after undergoing repairs for the fire in March 2011. The repairs took longer than planned as the damage was greater than initially estimated. On 23 February 2012, while in the port of Puerto Vallarta, Mexico, 22 passengers on the Carnival-organized "City and Jungle Tour" were robbed by an armed bandit. Passengers lost money, cameras, purses, passports, other documents and valuables. No shots were fired and everybody escaped without injuries.

In February 2013, Carnival Splendor sailed again around South America, re-positioning to New York City to cruise to the Caribbean and Bermuda. In November 2014, Carnival Splendor was re-positioned to Florida to offer seasonal seven-day cruises to the Eastern and Western Caribbean. In March 2014, Carnival announced Carnival Splendor would sail seasonally out of Norfolk, Virginia before heading back to New York beginning in 2015.

In October 2015, Carnival announced that Carnival Splendor would be re-positioned to China in 2018 offering year-round short cruises. However, Carnival subsequently announced in November 2016 that Carnival Splendor would instead relocate to Long Beach for the second time in January 2018, offering cruises to the Mexican Riviera. To move to Long Beach from the Caribbean, she sailed through the Panama Canal and became one of the largest ships to cross through the new locks.

On 2 March 2017, while 50 miles (80 km) offshore of Puerto Rico, the ship experienced engine trouble requiring operation on a single engine. Carnival canceled the remaining portion of the cruise and returned to Miami. Carnival offered a 50% refund off the cost of the cruise, free internet use for the remainder of the voyage, and a 50% discount off a future cruise.

In February 2018, Carnival announced Carnival Splendor would sail to Australia in December 2019 to operate year-round out of Sydney. On 5 October 2019, the ship embarked on a 24-day transpacific cruise to Singapore, where she was dry docked to undergo renovations before being homeported in Sydney. Stops along the voyage included Maui, Oahu, Guam, Kota Kinabalu, and Ho Chi Minh City. This was the longest voyage ever offered by Carnival, and was Carnival Splendor's final voyage out of Long Beach. From 30 October to 24 November, Carnival Splendor underwent renovations prior to sailing to her homeport in Sydney.

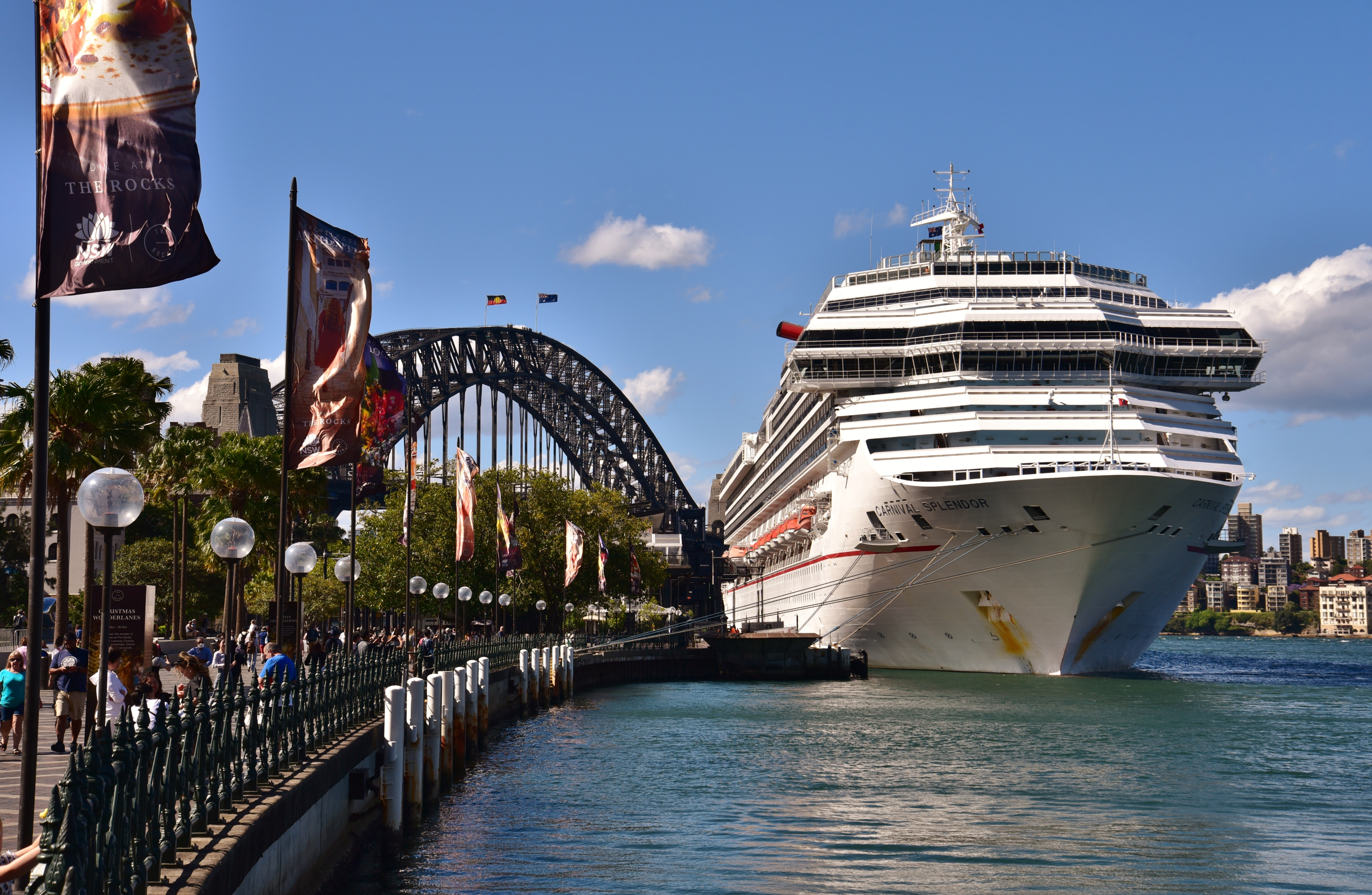
Carnival Splendor at Sydney in 2022

In February 2022, Carnival announced that due to uncertain times in the Australian cruise industry, Carnival Splendor would have her Australia-based cruises canceled through to the end of September 2022. With the ship expected to return to the US, a new homeport would be announced in the coming weeks. In March 2022, it was announced by Carnival's Brand Ambassador John Heald that the vessel would take a 23-day cruise from previous homeport in Seattle back to its current homeport in Sydney on 6 September 2022. On 2 May 2022, Carnival Splendor became the final ship of the fleet to return to service, marking Carnival's full return to service.

On 20 May 2023, a passenger of Carnival Splendor died while swimming at Mystery Island, Vanuatu. The ship was on a 9-day trip around the South Pacific and returned to Sydney on 24 May. It was believed that the passenger died while snorkeling.

In August 2024, the ship received new dining options, updated amenities and refreshed spaces during its 19-day refurbishment. At the same time Carnival Splendor adopted Carnival Cruise Line's new livery, with a navy-blue hull with red and white accents.

On 17 April 2026, two passengers of Carnival Splendor died in two separate incidents within hours. A woman died while snorkelling near the Tangalooma Wrecks at Moreton Island, Queensland. Then, as the ship was off the coast of Brisbane sailing back to Sydney, an elderly passenger believed to be in his 70s climbed the safety railings and jumped overboard from the ship. The ship's CCTV cameras confirmed the actions. The incident was reported to crew at 2 am on 18 April, prompting a man overboard alert and a subsequent search and rescue operation led by the AMSA. Following extensive searches, the man's body has not been found and is presumed dead. The ship, delayed by the search, was expected to arrive in Sydney at 6 pm on Sunday 19 April, 12 hours later than scheduled.
