= Huckaback =

Type of toweling cloth

Huckaback, also called simply huck, is a type of toweling cloth with a bird's eye or honeycomb pattern. It is a loosely woven fabric made of cotton or linen with huckaback weave.

== Structure ==
The fabric has small geometric patterns and extra texture. It has a plain, rough pebbled surface.

== Huckaback ==
Blended huck towels are made by keeping warp in cotton and weft in linen. Huckaback is a weave in which the weft yarns are of a relatively lower count, and they are loosely twisted (softly spun), making a floating and absorbing weave. It is woven on a dobby loom that has a mechanism for weaving geometric patterns. The huck cloth has good absorbency hence suitable for towels.

=== Swedish weave ===
Huck weave is a fabric used for an embellishment technique called Swedish weaving or huck weaving that became popular in mid 20th century.

== Use ==
Terry, the piled fabrics, and huck are preferred cloths for towels.

== See also ==
- Crash (fabric)
- Dobby (cloth)
- Honeycomb structure
- Towel

https://www.chelsealinen.co.uk/shop/towels-robes/irish-linen-huck-towels/irish-linen-huck-towels/
