= Linenize =

To Linenize or Linenizing is the process transforming paper, cloth, cotton to attain properties of Linen, a textile made from flax plant fibers or Linens fabrics. It may be thought of as the process of making another process imitate linen. A product which has been processed to achieve linen-like properties is said to be linenized.

One method involves impressing a linen-like pattern onto the surface of paper, cloth or other malleable substance.

Linenizing is most frequently done on paper products and its use on paper products goes back to the early part of the 20th century.

== Process ==
=== Paper ===
A paper roll is threaded between two hard rollers, usually made from steel. One or both of the steel rollers has a linen pattern engraved on it. As the nip pressure between the two hard rollers increases, the pattern from the engraved roller(s) is pressed into the paper. The result is a pattern that looks like a linen tablecloth or linen dress. Various patterns and depths of those patterns have been developed throughout the years. Generally, the pattern is a series of vertical and horizontal lines with distances varying between those lines.

==== Resins ====
Resins from acrodies gum, (Note: Also known as Botany Bay gum or mineral lac) produced from certain variants of the Xanthorrhoea plants species can be used for linenizing of the thinner qualities of paper.

== Sources ==
- Pearson, Henry C. (1918). Crude Rubber and Compounding Ingredients — A Test-book of Rubber Manufacture (3 ed.). New York: The India Rubber Publishing Company. OCLC 1042922936. OL 7217283M.
- "The "linenizing" of cotton. The possibility of cotton substitutes in a time of restricted linen supplies". Textile Weekly. 26 (665). Manchester: 721–722, 724. 29 November 1940.
