= Louis Crommelin =

Irish linen merchant (1652–1727)

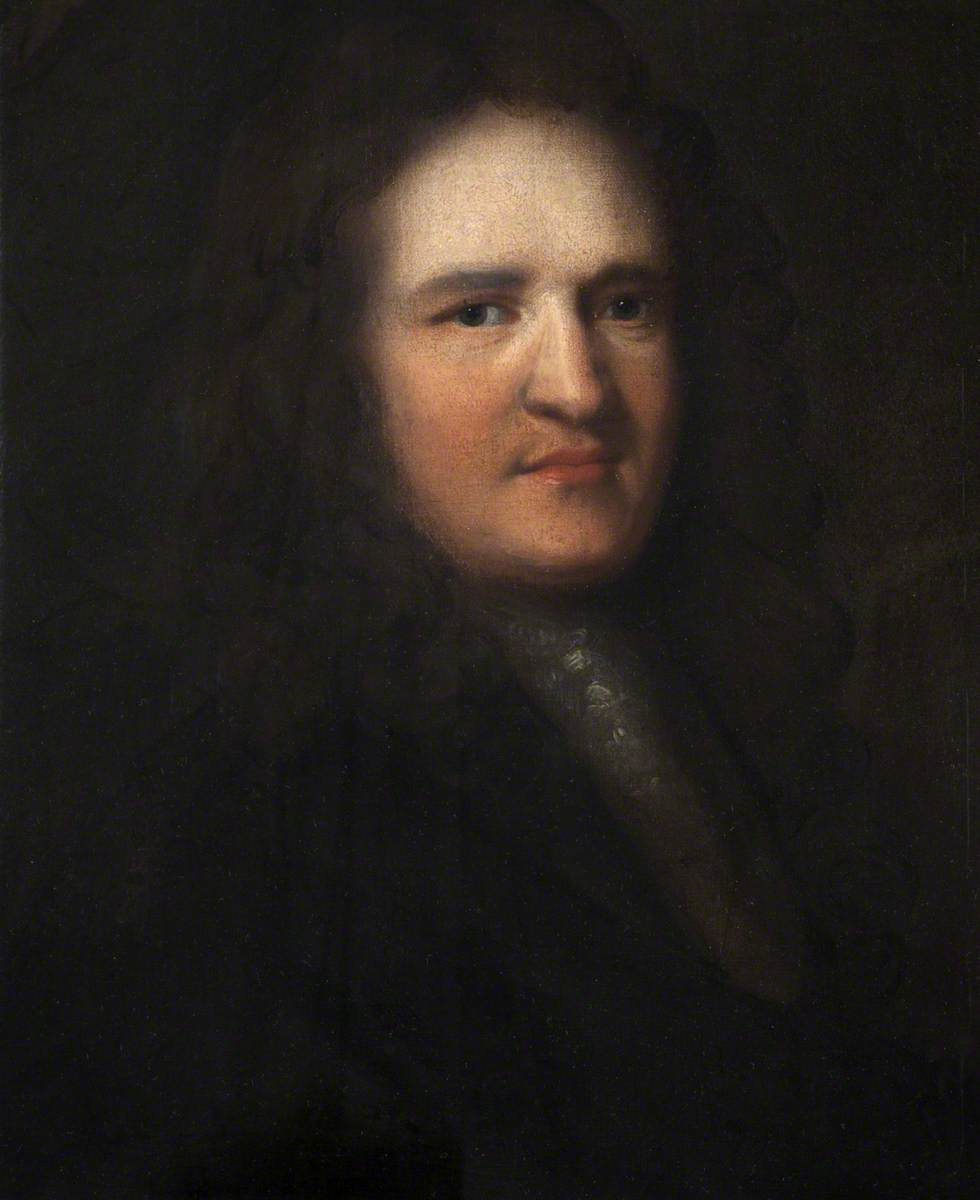
- Louis Crommelin
- Born: 1652; Armandcourt, near Saint-Quentin in Picardy
- Died: 1727 (aged 74–75)
- Occupation: Businessman

Samuel-Louis Louis Crommelin (1652–1727) was a French Huguenot exile, who became director of an Irish linen business.

== Life ==
Crommelin was born in May 1652 at Armandcourt, near Saint-Quentin in Picardy, into a family of landowners with a tradition of growing flax; his father, Louis Crommelin, married in 1648 to Marie Mettayer, was wealthy and had four sons, Samuel-Louis, Samuel, William, and Alexander. Samuel-Louis Crommelin, called Louis, was in business flax-spinning and linen-weaving. The family was Protestant, and the Revocation of the Edict of Nantes in 1685 hit hard even though Louis was a Catholic convert of 1683. With his son and two daughters he made his way to Amsterdam. There he became partner in a bank, and was joined by his brothers Samuel and William.

Under William III and Mary II, Thomas Southwell had access to funds to develop Irish industry. Huguenot linen-workers had been encouraged to settle at Lisburn where already there was some manufacture of linen. In 1696 the English parliament passed an act admitting all products of hemp and flax duty free from Ireland to England; the Irish parliament in November 1697 passed an act for fostering the linen manufacture. William III's policy was to discourage the Irish woollen trade, but to build up linen manufacture there. Crommelin was the most prominent Huguenot attracted by Southwell. He arrived at Lisburn in the autumn of 1698, and made recommendations for improving the linen industry in a memorial of 16 April 1699; which were implemented quickly. Crommelin was made "overseer of the royal linen manufacture of Ireland", and lent money for the scheme. In 1702 Queen Anne confirmed its royal patent.

Crommelin began by ordering looms from Flanders and Holland, and Huguenot weavers were introduced. He adopted Irish spinning-wheel but worked to improve it. His maker of the reeds, which control the warp threads, was Henry Mark du Pré (d. 1750), of Cambrai.

Baron Conway gave a site for weaving workshops, and Irish apprentices were taken on. Dutchmen were engaged to teach flax-growing to farmers, and to superintend bleaching operations. It is not without some reason that Crommelin has been credited with originating, as regards Ulster, a system of technical education for the textile art. Crommelin was assisted by his brothers, and the linens and cambrics could replace imported textiles. In 1705 a factory was opened at Kilkenny, under the management of William Crommelin.

Crommelin expanded operations, with the manufacture of hempen sailcloth at Rathkeale and other locations. He was given a pension in 1716, and died at Lisburn on 14 July 1727, aged 75. He was buried, with other Huguenots, in the eastern corner of the graveyard of Lisburn Cathedral.

== Family ==
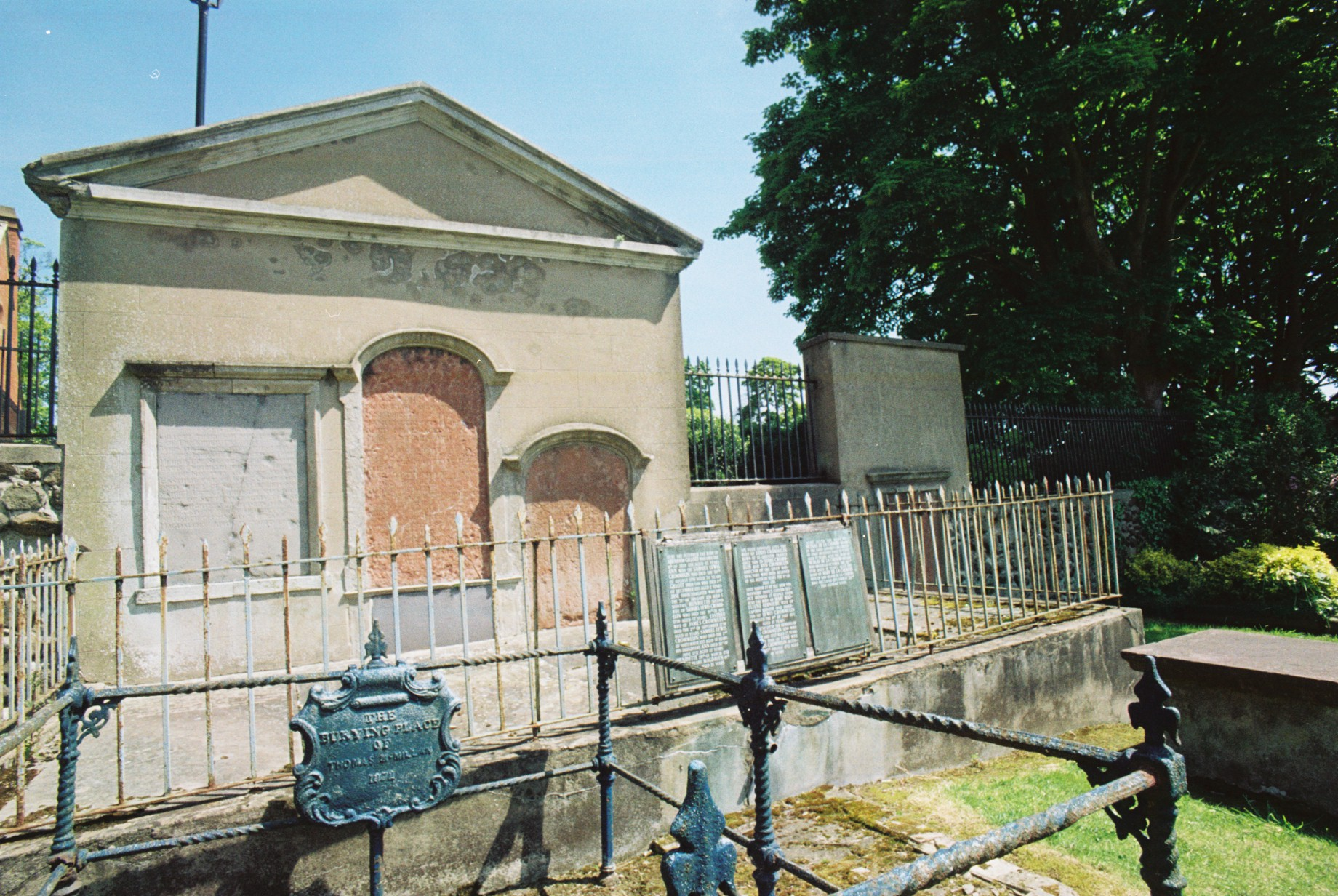
Crommelin grave, Lisburn Cathedral

The wife of Louis Crommelin was named Ann. She survived her husband by twenty-eight years, dying August 17, 1755, at the age of 97. Their only son, Louis, born at St Quentin, died at Lisburn on 1 July 1711, aged 28. Their daughter, Mary Madelien, who married Captain de Bernière, died 8 July 1715, aged 21. All four are buried in the family vault in the churchyard of Christ Church Cathedral, Lisburn.

The Crommelin family became extinct in the main line, but the name survived in a branch of the family of de la Cherois, connections by marriage.

== Notes ==
Attribution

This article incorporates text from a publication now in the public domain: Stephen, Leslie, ed. (1888). "Crommelin, Samuel-Louis". Dictionary of National Biography. Vol. 13. London: Smith, Elder & Co.
