= Dye lot =

Record for identifying dyed yarn

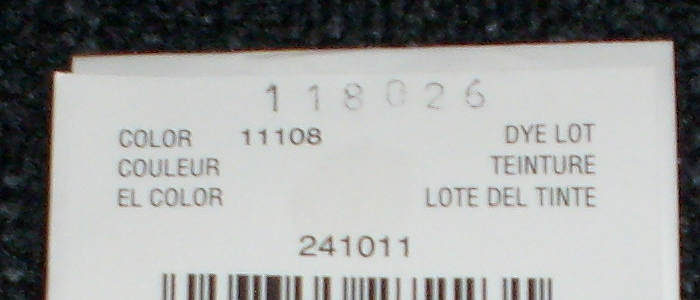
A dye lot marking from a yarn label. The dye lot is the large stamped number at top. Other information such as color code has been preprinted in smaller digits.

A dye lot is a record taken during the dyeing of yarn to identify yarn that received its coloration in the same vat at the same time. Yarn manufacturers assign each lot a unique identification number and stamp it on the label before shipping. Slight differences in temperature, dyeing time, and other factors can result in different shades of the same color between different dye lots of otherwise identical production. Although the component elements of a dye lot number are of interest only for internal business recordkeeping, retail yarn consumers have an interest in ensuring that they purchase a given color of yarn from identical dye lots.

== The dye lot problem ==
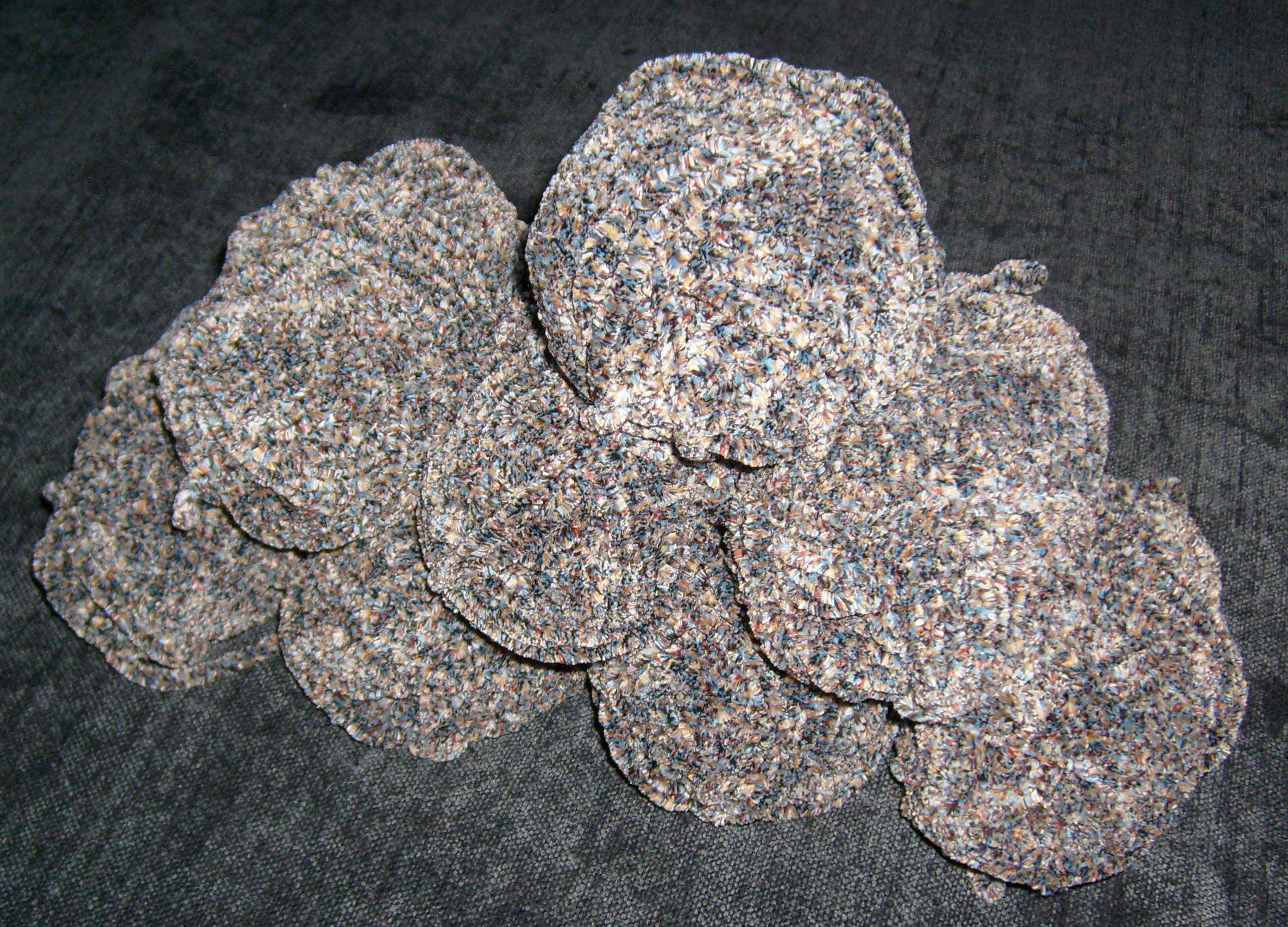
Skeins of yarn from the same dye lot in sufficient quantity to produce a single sweater.

The dye lot number is important information for hobbyist knitters and crocheters, because the use of yarn from different dye lots can spoil the appearance of handmade textiles. These shade variations may be subtle enough to be undetectable on a store shelf, but actual differences in shade becomes apparent during knitting or crocheting or after washing. Unmatched dye lots are a significant problem to knitters and crocheters because the problem manifests after days or weeks of labor, by which time the supplier's stock of the original dye lot may have been depleted.

The usual solution to the dye lot dilemma is to purchase sufficient skeins from the identical lot before beginning a project. Published craft designs provide estimated material quantities for this purpose. If the crafter neglects to check dye lots or a design underestimates the yarn requirement, or if a store lacks sufficient quantities of a single lot, then one compromise solution is to construct the item so that a contrasting color separates yarns from different lots. Other workarounds are to change stitch patterns for the odd lot, to use the odd lot for a border or other separate and contrasting element, or to conceal the juncture between two dye lots with a surface embellishment.

== No dye lot yarn ==
A few manufacturers produce yarn without a dye lot designation by dyeing fibers before spinning. This has the advantage of avoiding the dye lot problem, but the yarn is usually a discount grade of acrylic. No dye lot yarn is suitable for practice and some projects, but not to create fine apparel.

== Dye lot in other uses ==
Use of the same dye lot or run number may also be important in other applications, such as: Wallpaper, fabrics for drapes and other uses, carpets, flooring, tiles, etc.
