= Crash (fabric) =

Woven textile

Crash is a coarse fabric with a rough, irregular surface, made from thick, uneven yarns. Crash fabric is coarse linen-based rugged material made from both dyed and raw yarns. The yarns used are often grey or white in color. Crash fabrics are indistinct woven. Linen is generally used for the warp, while blends of linen and jute, cotton, and wool, etc. were used for the filling. The weave structure may vary from plain, twill to fancy. Crash fabric is very thick, strong, rough and because of linen's characteristics it is absorbent also.

Russian Crash

The coarsest type was called Russian crash, made of Russian flax, flax grown in Russia of the Motchenetz (water-retted) and Slanetz (dew-retted) varieties. The fabric was strong and absorbent. It was used for towels, sportswear and Russian cross stitch.

== Origin ==
The crash fabric has been linked primarily to Russia. In 1836 there were 3742 Flax mills and manufacturers in Russia. Crash was very popular for its aesthetics, and individual characteristics, fabric composition, and heavy structure made it a fabric of special interest in the mid 19th century.

== Use ==
The fabric was thick, strong, with uneven texture. Crash fabric was used mainly for towels, upholstery, garments and linens. It was famous for its unique texture, good wear and tear and absorbent properties. Crash was used for towel, draperies and other decorative cloths, dresses, caps, skirts, suits and sport coats. Russian crash was popular for its artistic (uneven) appearance and extraordinarily absorbent properties.

== See also ==
- Huckaback fabric – a type of towel cloth.
