= John Heald =

British banker (born 1965)

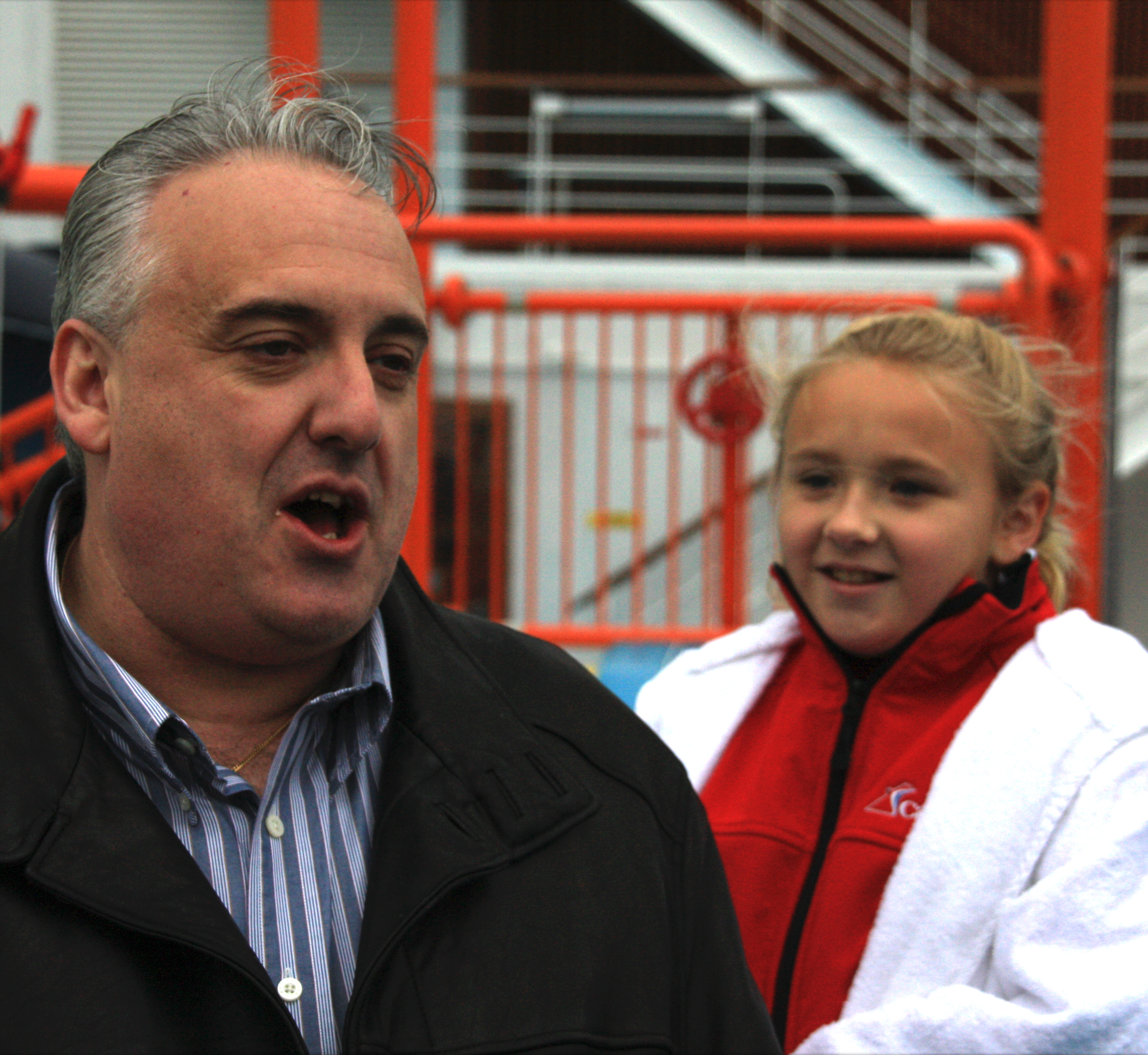
- Heald in November 2009.
- Born: 22 January 1965 (age 61); Essex, England
- Occupations: Senior Cruise Director at Carnival Cruise Lines; Brand Ambassador for Carnival Corporation.
- Known for: John Heald's Blog
- Spouse: Heidi Heald
- Children: 1

John Heald (born 22 January 1965) is the Brand Ambassador and senior cruise director of Carnival Cruise Lines and a blogger for the cruise line. He first became a Carnival cruise director in 1990. In 2004, he was named the senior cruise director of Carnival.

Heald blogs about the daily occurrences in his career as a cruise director.

== Blog ==
Heald introduced his blog during the first sailing of the Carnival Freedom in March 2007. He was asked by Carnival's management to write a blog. The blog was initially planned to be several months long, but Heald's "engaging personality" and "candid commentary" were so well received by his readers that he continued blogging. Heald plans to blog "as long as it stays fresh and people keep tuning in".

Every day, Heald answers about 60 questions about cruising. The blog has received more than 17 million hits by October 2013—up from 4.5 million in February 2008—and many of Heald's daily posts receive from 50 to 60 comments. Heald's blogs are about his passengers and the events that occur to him while he is cruise director. His blog has a disclaimer, saying that the "views and opinions represent my own". He has been nicknamed "Bill Bryson at sea".

Gene Sloan of USA Today wrote that Heald is "famously irreverent" and "known for his candid, funny and sometimes outrageously inappropriate daily missives about life at sea".

== Cruise career ==
Heald was a commodity banker for Lloyd's of London in England. In 1989, he began working for Carnival Cruises as a wine steward and a bar waiter. He is the first Carnival Cruise director who did not begin working in the entertainment aspect of cruising.

=== Cruise ship director ===
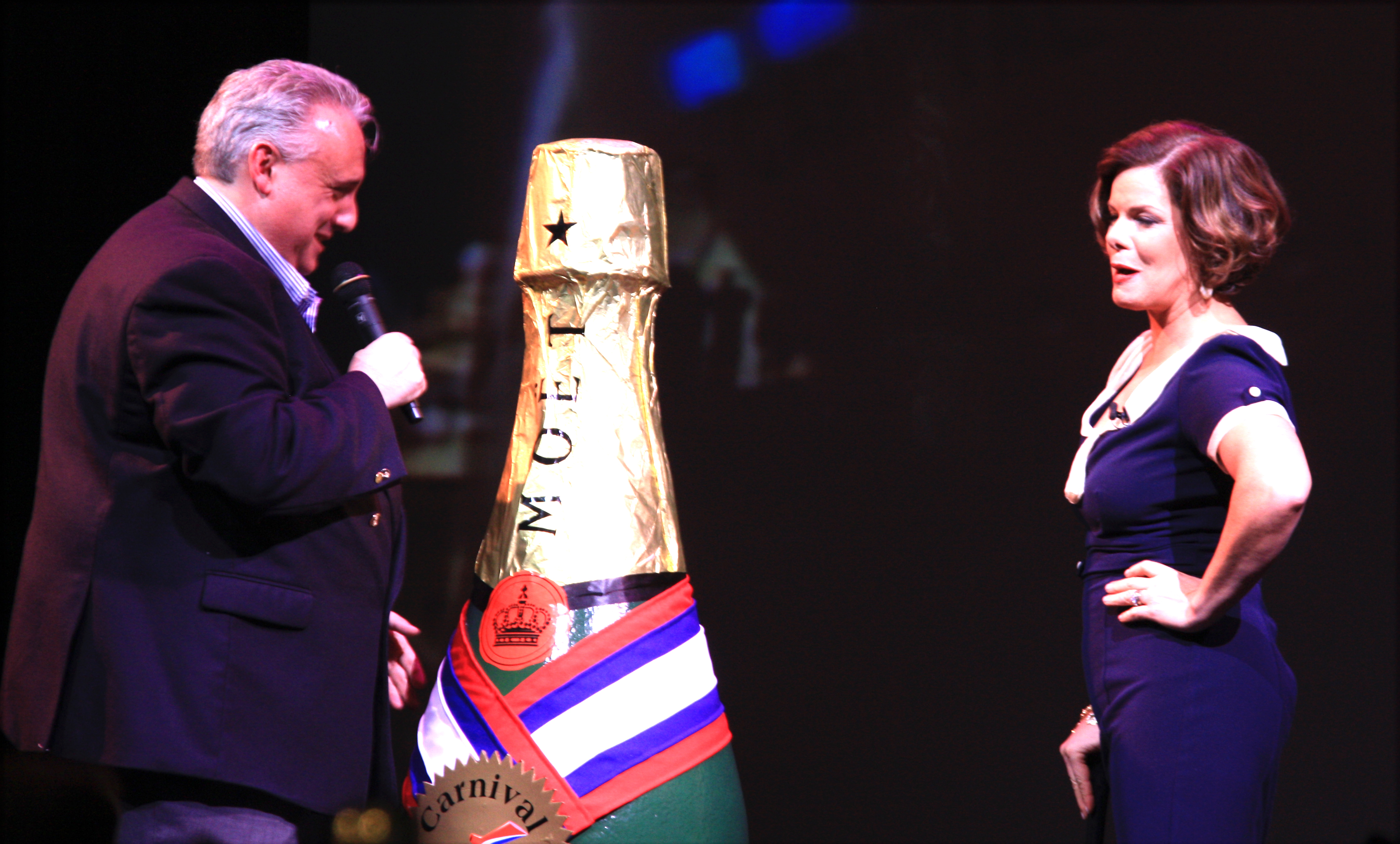
Heald introduces actress Marcia Gay Harden on Carnival Dream in November 2009

John Heald became a cruise director at Carnival in 1990. By 2004, he was promoted to the position of senior cruise director. As the senior director at Carnival, John Heald is appointed the director of most new Carnival ships during their first sailings. Before each new voyage, he creates videos, telling his passengers about the cheapest excursions.

Heald has a contract with Carnival, in which he works for six consecutive months followed by two months off. He oversees the entertainment aspect of the ship, including the dancers and the orchestra.

John Heald was the cruise director of the Carnival Splendor when the ship's engine room caught fire, stranding the passengers at sea off the coast of Mexico for more than three days. On his blog, he discussed the incident, which the Los Angeles Times's Mary Forgione called a "lurid personal account of being stranded at sea".

In September 2007, Carnival gave Heald the "Sea Going Employee of the Year" award.

=== Bloggers cruise ===
In January 2008, Heald led his first "bloggers cruise", called John Heald Bloggers Cruise, which was a week-long cruise attended by 700 of his "hard-core fans". He entertained the attendees with a "welcome aboard reception", a tea session with him, and several meetings where he answered questions. During one of these cruises, he and 100 of his passengers on Carnival Fantasy helped paint a school that was struck by Hurricane Katrina. On "Bloggers Cruise Community Service Day", Heald and his companions helped plant trees and clean up waste in New Orleans.

"Big Ed" is the moniker of Ed Konefe, who was the first poster on Heald's blog and who is "arguably the most notorious participant". During the bloggers cruise, Konefe said, "We started as bloggers, went from there to being friends, and now we're family."

== Personal life ==
John Heald was born in Essex, England on 22 January 1965. In 1995, John Heald met his wife, Heidi, then a flower market auctioneer, when he was eating at a restaurant in Amsterdam. He sent her and her comrades wine, and Heidi and her friends paid the bill for Heald's and his friends' meal. Heald characterized it as "love at first sight". In May 2009, John and Heidi had a daughter, Kye. Kye's name means "beautiful ocean". In June 2015 at the Fincantieri shipyard in Italy, Kye officiated over a ceremony where coins were fused to Carnival Vista to commemorate the finishing of the new ship's exterior. Carnival anointed her the ship's "godchild". USA Today said six-year-old Kye is "believed to be the youngest person honored at such a ceremony".
