= Spread tow fabric =

Spread tow fabric (stf) is a type of lightweight fabric. Its production involves the steps of spreading a tow in thin and flat uni-directional tape (Spread Tow Tape, STT), and weaving the tapes into a Spread Tow Fabric. This technique increases the mechanical properties of the material and is also used to reduce weight on composites. Manufacturers of Spread Tow Tapes include Oxeon AB, Teknomax Corp., Harmoni Industry Inc., Sakaiovex.

== Technique ==
The spread tow technique was invented by Dr. Nandan Khokar in 1995. By arranging the fibres in the woven structure in the straightest orientation possible the fibre properties are used in the most effective way to carry load, both in tensile and compression.

STF offers high versatility as it overcomes the limitations of traditional woven fabrics produced using tows. The flatness of STF, which comes from near absence of crimp, significantly reduces accumulation of matrix at the interlacing points and thereby the dead weight of the final composite material. This not only reduces the weight of the final composite material product but also eliminates the print-through defects associated with post curing of the undesired matrix accumulation.

Although the technique is based on the same principles, the spreading of the tow can be made in different ways, for example using water or air.

== Uses ==
Spread Tow Fabric offers the advantages of relatively lower crimp, increased smoothness and less-pronounced crossover defects. As a greater number of filaments are exposed in STF they also present correspondingly improved wetting ability.

Additionally, the STF offers improved mechanical performance, thinness, draping ability and even different aesthetics compared with those produced using 1k – 6k tows.

Spread Tow Fabric is often produced with carbon fiber and is widely used in the composites industry in a number of applications.

Spread tow reinforcements (str) are reinforcements made using spread tow material, fabric or UD tapes, which is new category of composite reinforcements.
