= Persian weave =

Method of weave in jewelry

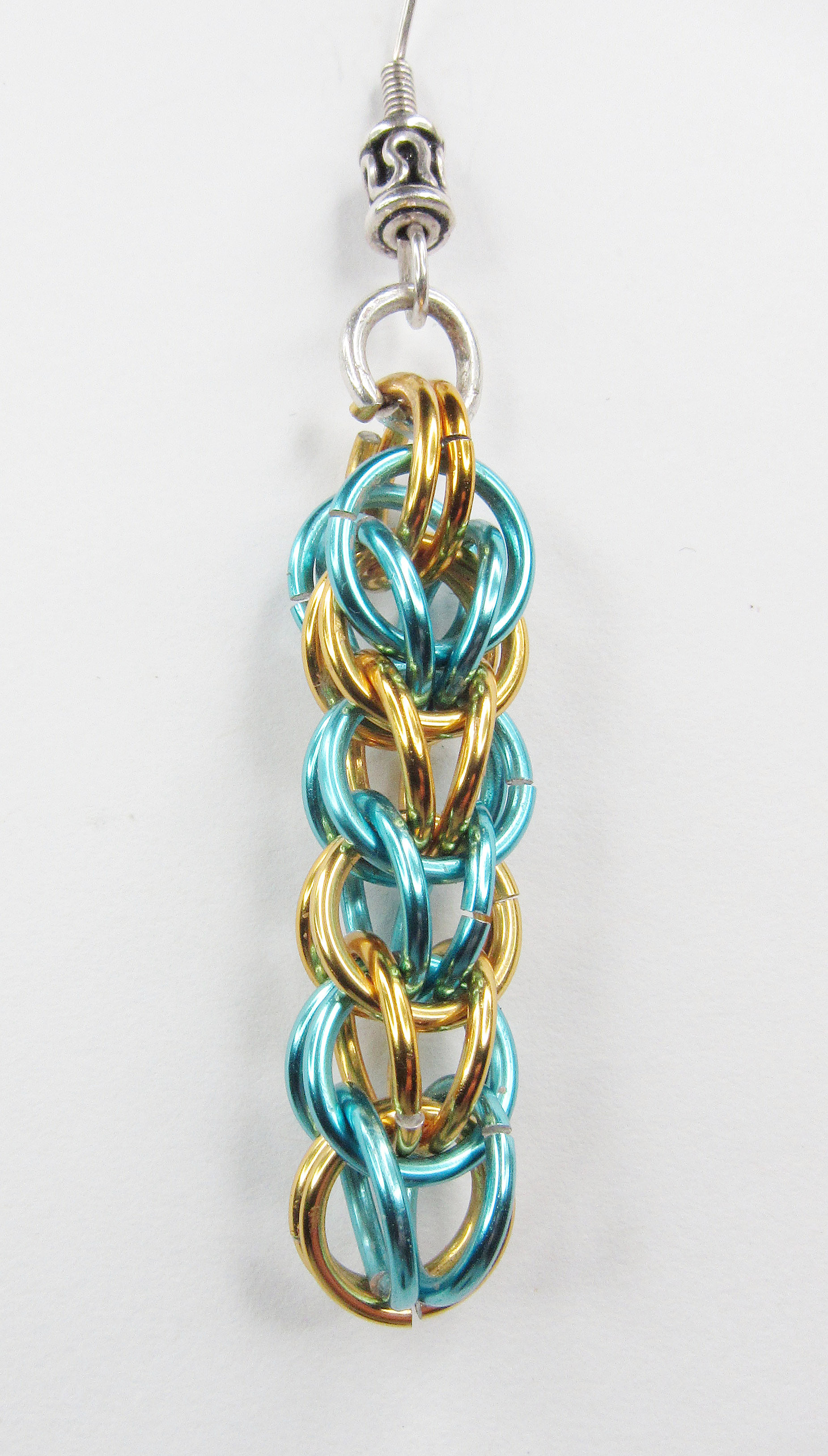
Drop earring in Full Persian 6-in-1 chainmail

Persian weave is a method of weave used in jewelry and other art forms, using jump rings.

The Persian family of weaves is a chainmail weave based on a stacked ring orientation. In the construction of Persian weaves the rings become stacked and form pairs. Most Persian weaves have both left and right-handed versions.

== Sorts ==
- Half Persian 3 in 1
- Half Persian 4 in 1
- Full Persian 6 in 1
- Double Persian 10 in 1
