= Heald Stream Falls =

Waterfall

Coordinates: 45°44′35″N 70°15′48″W

Heald Stream Falls is a waterfall in Maine, United States, about 6 miles (10 km) from the US–Canada border. It is composed of a horsetail and cascades that drop about 18 feet (6 m).
