= Linen =

Textile made from spun flax fibre

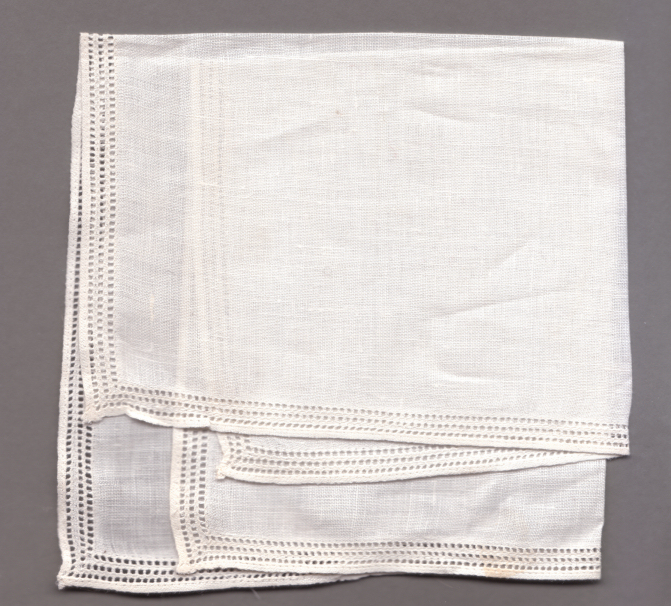
A linen handkerchief with drawn thread work around the edges

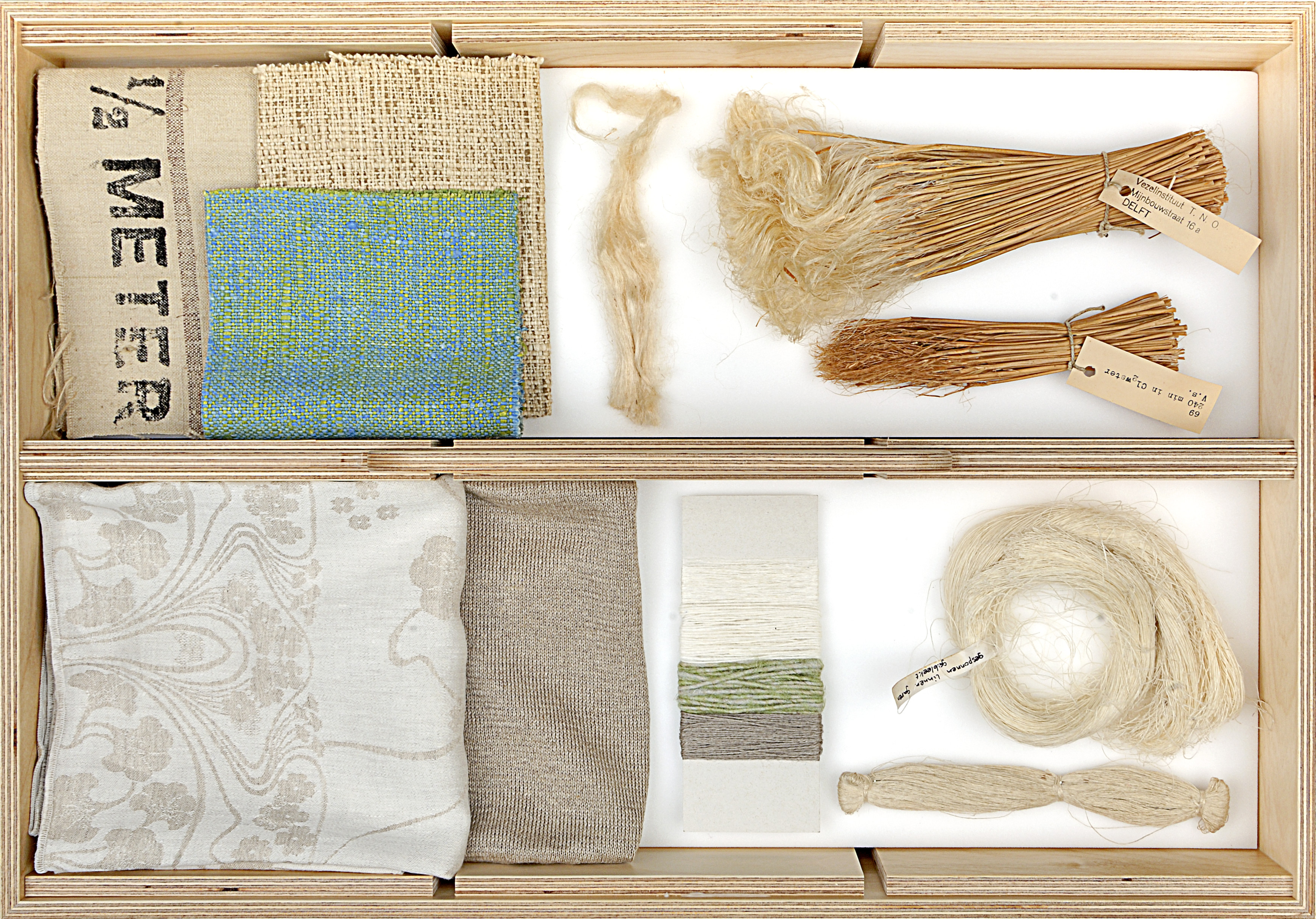
Flax stem, fiber, yarn, and woven and knitted linen textiles

Linen (/ˈlɪnən/) is a textile made from the bast fibers of the flax plant. Linen cloth has been produced since ancient times primarily for use in clothing and household items.

Linen is very strong and absorbent and dries faster than cotton. Because of these properties, linen clothing is comfortable to wear in hot weather. Linen also has other distinctive characteristics, such as its tendency to wrinkle. Linen textiles can be woven or knitted from flax fibers. It takes significantly longer to harvest and process than cotton. It is also more difficult to weave than cotton. Linen is often marketed as a more eco-friendly alternative to synthetic fibers or water-intensive fibers like cotton.

Linen textiles appear to be some of the oldest in the world; their history goes back many thousands of years. Dyed flax fibers found in a cave in the Caucasus (present-day Georgia) suggest the use of woven linen fabrics from wild flax may date back over 30,000 years. Linen was used in ancient civilizations including Mesopotamia and ancient Egypt, and linen is mentioned in the Bible. In the 18th century and beyond, the linen industry was important in the economies of several countries in Europe as well as the American colonies.

Textiles in a linen weave, even when made of cotton, hemp, or other non-flax fibers, are also loosely referred to as "linen".

== Etymology ==
The word linen is of West Germanic origin and cognate to the Latin name for the flax plant, linum, and the earlier Greek λινόν (linón).

This word history has given rise to a number of other terms in English, most notably line, from the use of a linen (flax) thread to determine a straight line. It is also etymologically related to a number of other terms, including lining, because linen was often used to create an inner layer for clothing, and lingerie, from French, which originally denoted underwear made of linen.

== History ==
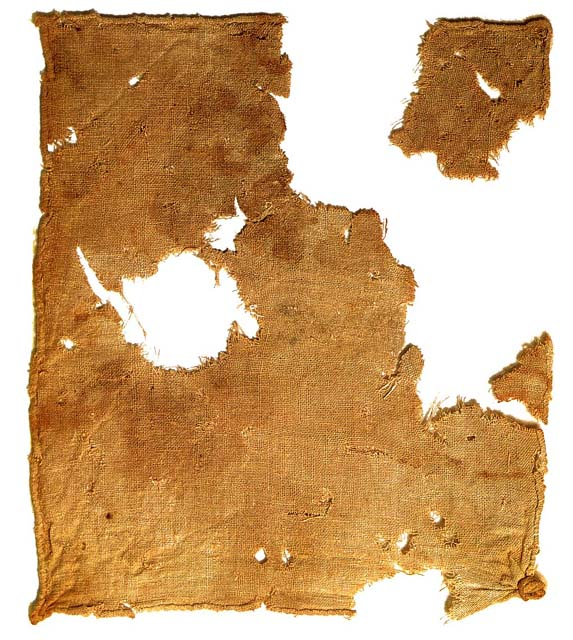
Linen cloth recovered from Qumran Cave 1 near the Dead Sea

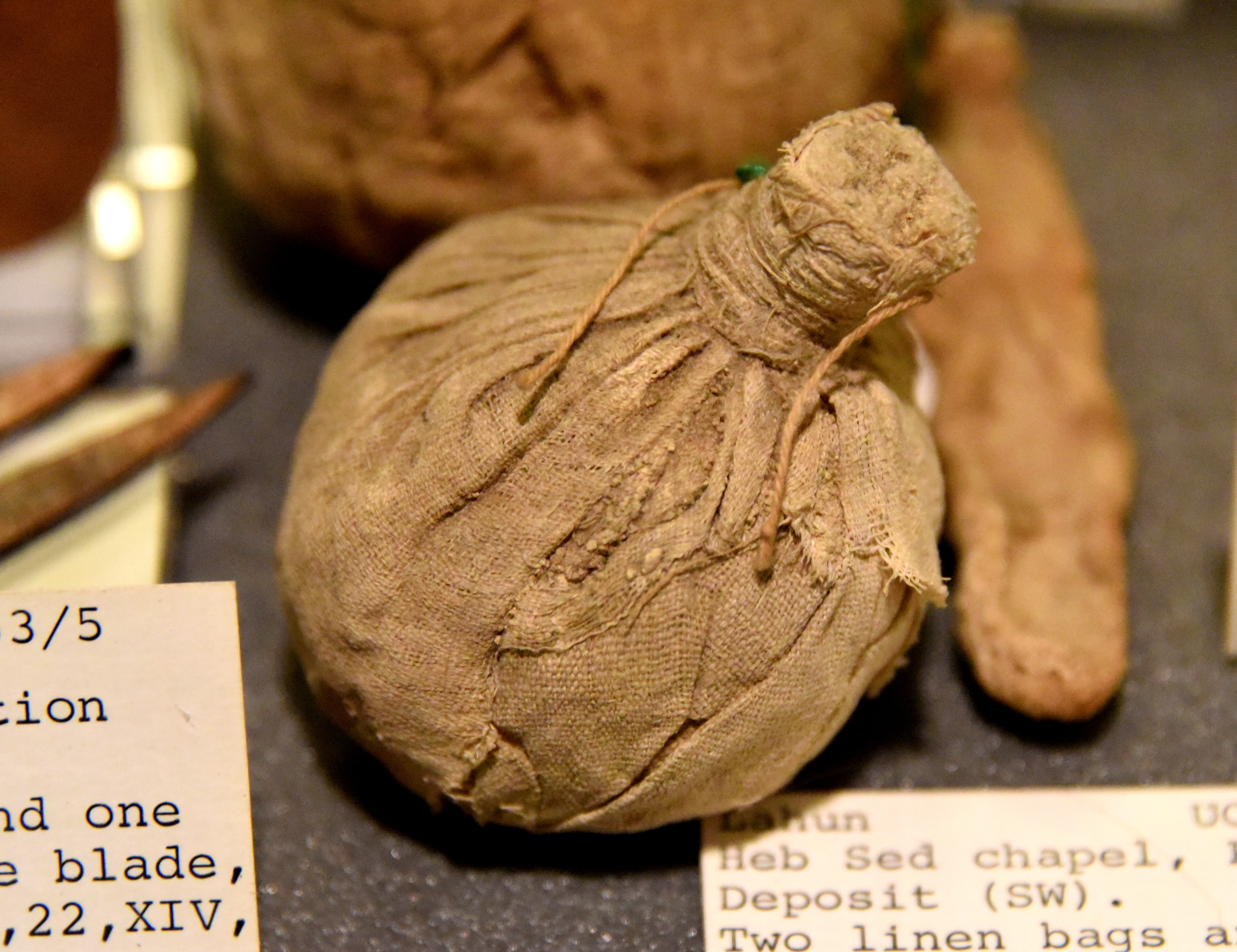
A bag of white linen, unopened. Contains rolls of linen. Foundation deposit, Heb Sed Chapel at Lahun, Faiyum, Egypt. 12th Dynasty. The Petrie Museum of Egyptian Archaeology, London.

Many linen fragments have been found in archeological sites, suggesting people in various parts of the world began weaving linen at least several thousand years ago.

=== Early history ===
The discovery of dyed flax fibers in a cave in Southern Caucasus, West Asia (modern-day country of Georgia) dated to 36,000 years ago suggests that ancient people used wild flax fibers to create linen-like fabrics from an early date. Fragments of straw, seeds, fibers, yarns, and various types of fabrics, including linen samples, dating to about 8,000 BC have been found in Swiss lake dwellings. Linen was also recovered from Qumran Cave 1 near the Dead Sea.

In ancient Mesopotamia flax was domesticated and linen was produced. It was used mainly by wealthy people, such as priests. Woven flax textile fragments have been "found between infant and child" in a burial at Çatalhöyük, a large settlement dating to around 7,000 BC. The Sumerian poem of the courtship of Inanna mentions flax and linen.

In ancient Egypt linen was used for mummification and for burial shrouds. White linen was also worn as clothing on a daily basis. The Tarkhan dress (dated to between 3482 and 3102 BC), considered to be among the oldest woven garments in the world, is made of linen. Plutarch wrote that the priests of Isis also wore linen because of its purity. Egyptian mummies were wrapped in linen as a symbol of light and purity and as a display of wealth. Some of these fabrics, woven from hand-spun yarns, were very fine for their day, but are coarse compared with modern linen.

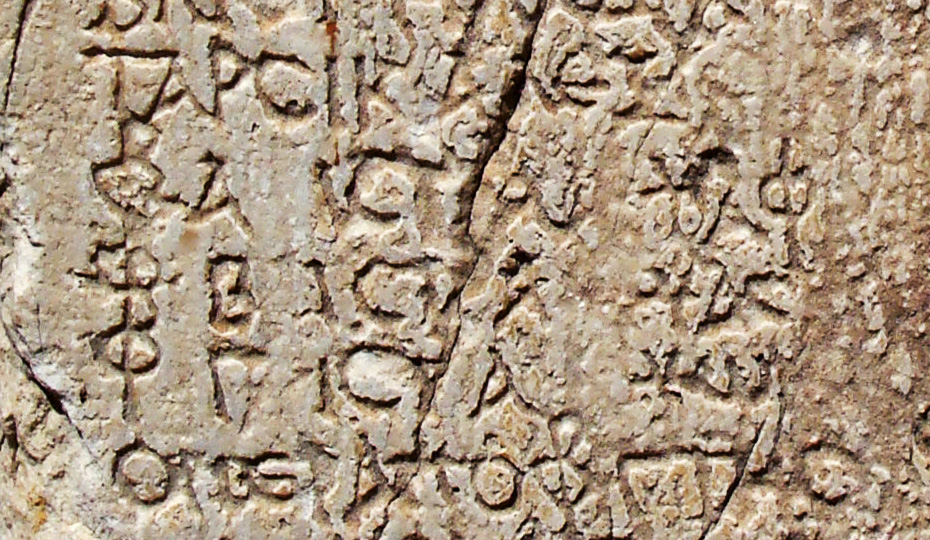
Diocletian's 4th-century maximum prices edict showing prices for three grades of linen across the Roman Empire

The earliest written documentation of a linen industry comes from the Linear B tablets of Pylos, Greece. There are many references to linen throughout the Bible.

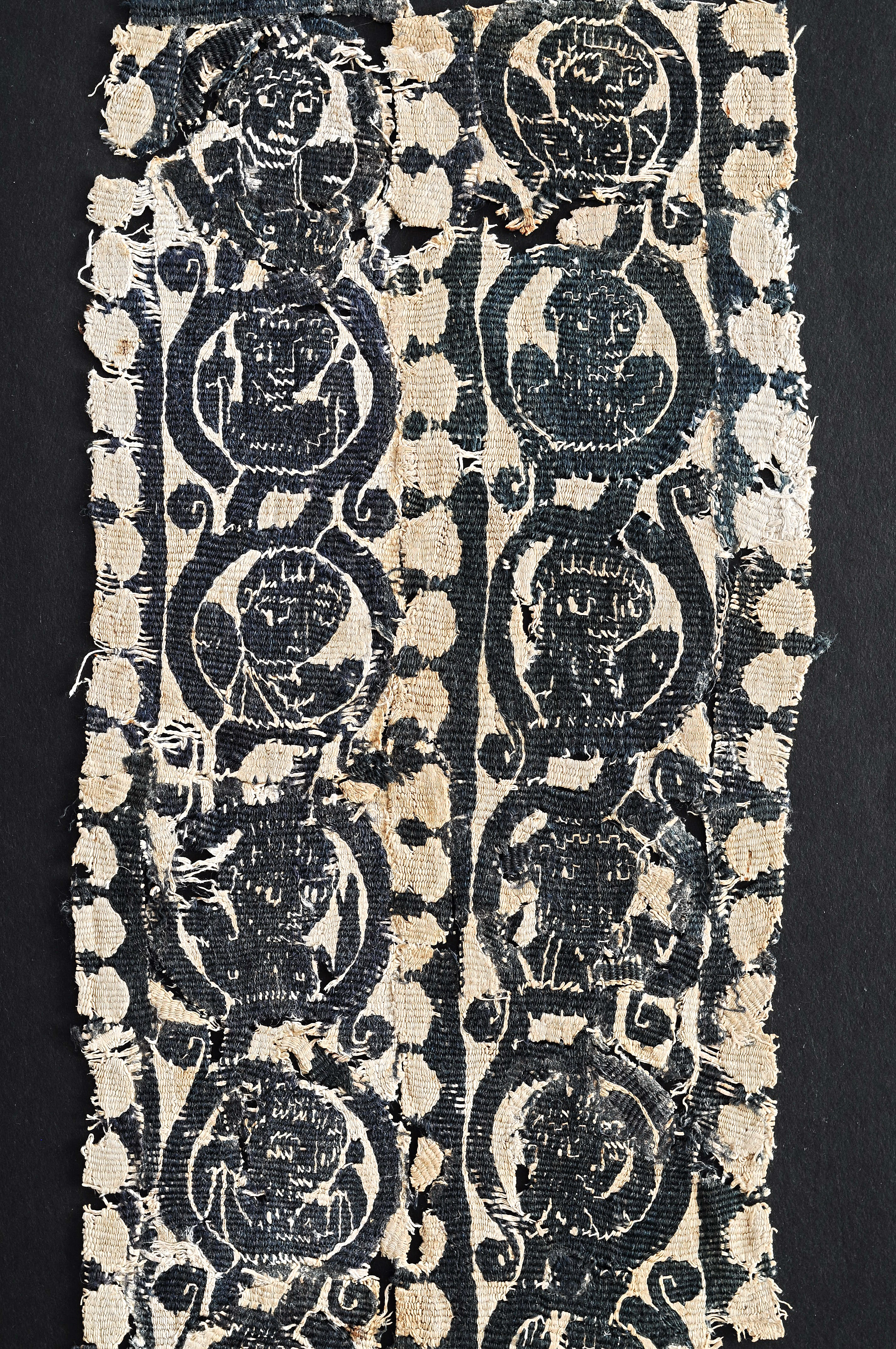
Ancient Coptic material

=== Middle Ages ===
By the Middle Ages, there was a thriving trade for German flax and linen. The trade spread throughout Germany by the 9th century and spread to Flanders and Brabant by the 11th century. The Lower Rhine was a center of linen making in the Middle Ages. Flax was cultivated and linen used for clothing in Ireland by the 11th century. Evidence suggests that flax may have been grown and sold in Southern England in the 12th and 13th centuries. Textiles, primarily linen and wool, were produced in decentralized home weaving mills.

=== Modern history ===
Linen continued to be valued for garments through the 16th century. Specimens of linen garments worn by historical figures have survived. For example, a linen cap worn by Emperor Charles V was carefully preserved after his death in 1558.

There is a long history of the production of linen in Ireland. When the Edict of Nantes was revoked in 1685, many of the Huguenots who fled France settled in the British Isles and elsewhere. They brought improved methods for linen production with them, contributing to the growth of the linen industry in Ireland. Among them was Louis Crommelin, a leader who was appointed overseer of the royal linen manufacture of Ireland. He settled in the town of Lisburn, a major linen production center throughout history. During the Victorian era the majority of the world's linen was produced in Lisburn, which gained it the name Linenopolis. Although the linen industry was already established in Ulster, Louis Crommelin found scope for improvement in weaving. His efforts were so successful that he was appointed by the Government to develop the industry over a much wider range than the small confines of Lisburn and its surroundings. The result of his work was the establishment, under statute, of the Board of Trustees of the Linen Manufacturers of Ireland in the year 1711. Several grades were produced including coarse lockram. The Living Linen Project was set up in 1995 as an oral archive of the knowledge of the Irish linen industry, which was at that time still available within a nucleus of people who formerly worked in the industry in Ulster.

The linen industry was increasingly critical in the economies of Europe in the 18th and 19th centuries. In England and Germany, industrialization and machine production replaced manual work, moving production from the home to new factories.

Linen was also an important product in the American colonies, where it was brought over with the first settlers and became the most commonly used fabric and a valuable asset for colonial households. The homespun movement encouraged the use of flax to make home spun textiles. Through the 1830s, most farmers in the northern United States continued to grow flax for linen to be used for the family's clothing.

In the late 19th and early 20th centuries, linen was very significant to Russia and its economy. At one time it was the country's greatest export item and Russia produced about 80% of the world's fiber flax crop.

In December 2006, the General Assembly of the United Nations proclaimed 2009 to be the International Year of Natural Fibres in order to raise people's awareness of linen and other natural fibers.

== Uses ==
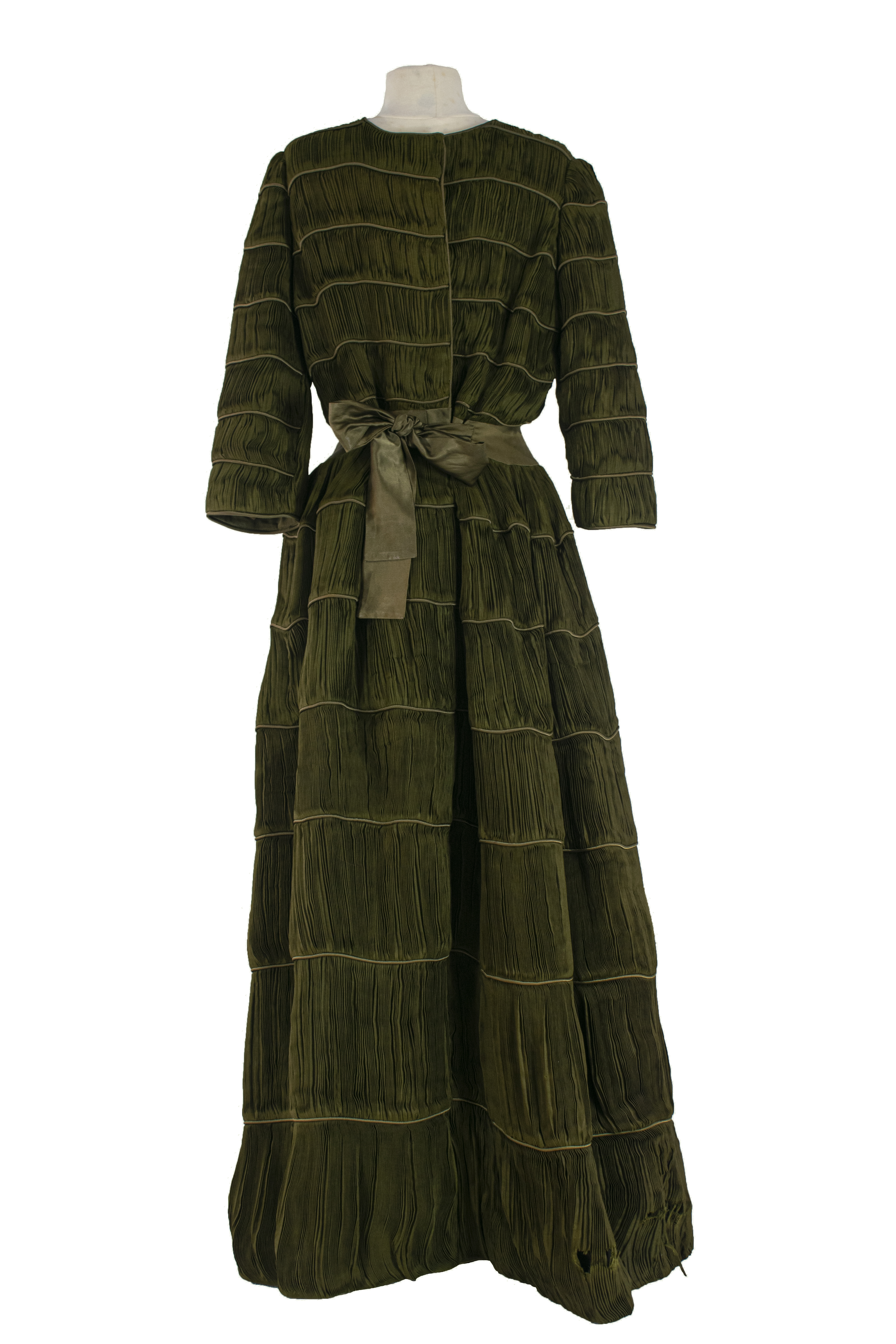
Green Pleated Linen Dress, 'Irish Moss' by Irish fashion designer Sybil Connolly

Many products can be made with linen, such as clothing, bed sheets, aprons, bags, towels (swimming, bath, beach, body and wash towels), napkins, runners, and upholstery. It is used especially in sailcloth and lent cloth, sewing threads, handkerchiefs, table cloth, sheets, collars, cuffs etc. Linen fabric has been used for table coverings, bed coverings and clothing for centuries.

Today, linen is a more expensive textile produced in relatively small quantities. It has a long staple (individual fiber length) relative to cotton and other natural fibers. The significant cost of linen derives not only from the difficulty of working with the thread due to its lack of elasticity but also because the flax plant itself requires a great deal of attention. Consequently linen is considerably more expensive to manufacture than cotton.

The collective term "linens" is still often used generically to describe a class of woven or knitted bed, bath, table and kitchen textiles traditionally made of flax-based linen but today made from a variety of fibers. The term "linens" refers to lightweight undergarments such as shirts, chemises, waist-shirts, lingerie (a cognate with linen), and detachable shirt collars and cuffs, all of which were historically made almost exclusively out of linen. The inner layer of fine composite cloth garments (as for example dress jackets) was traditionally made of linen, hence the word lining.

The uses for linen changed dramatically from the 1970s, when about 5% of linen produced was used for fashion fabrics, to the 1990s, when about 70% was for clothing textiles.

Linen uses range across bed and bath fabrics (tablecloths, bath towels, dish towels, bed sheets); home and commercial furnishing items (wallpaper/wall coverings, upholstery, window treatments); apparel items (suits, dresses, skirts, shirts); and industrial products (luggage, canvases, sewing thread). It was once the preferred yarn for hand-sewing the uppers of moccasin-style shoes (loafers), but has been replaced by synthetics.

A linen handkerchief, pressed and folded to display the corners, was a standard decoration of a well-dressed man's suit during most of the first part of the 20th century.

Nowadays, linen is one of the most preferred materials for bed sheets due to its durability and hypoallergenic properties. Linen can be up to three times stronger than cotton. This is because the cellulose fibers in linen yarn are slightly longer and wrapped tighter than those found in cotton yarn, which gives it great durability and allows linen products to be long-lasting.

In 2005 researchers were working on a cotton/flax blend to create new yarns to improve the feel of denim during hot, humid weather. Conversely, some brands such as 100% Capri specially treat the linen to look like denim.

Linen fabric is one of the preferred traditional supports for oil painting. In the United States cotton is popularly used instead, as linen is many times more expensive there, restricting its use to professional painters. In Europe, however, linen is usually the only fabric support available in art shops; in the UK both are freely available, cotton being cheaper. Linen is preferred to cotton for its strength, durability and archival integrity.

Linen is also used extensively by artisan bakers. Known as a couche, the flax cloth is used to hold the dough into shape while in the final rise, just before baking. The couche is heavily dusted with flour which is rubbed into the pores of the fabric. Then the shaped dough is placed on the couche. The floured couche makes a "non stick" surface to hold the dough. Then ridges are formed in the couche to keep the dough from spreading.

In the past, linen was also used for books (the only surviving example of which is the Liber Linteus). Due to its strength, in the Middle Ages linen was used for shields, gambesons, and bowstrings; in classical antiquity it was used to make a type of body armour, referred to as a linothorax. Additionally, linen was commonly used to make riggings, sail-cloths, nets, ropes, and canvases because the tensility of the cloth would increase by 20% when wet.

Irish linen is very popular for wrapping pool and billiard cues, subject to absorption of sweat from hands—the linen maintains its strength when wet.

In 1923, the city of Bielefeld in Germany issued banknotes printed on linen. United States currency paper is made from 25% linen and 75% cotton.

== Flax fiber ==
=== Description ===
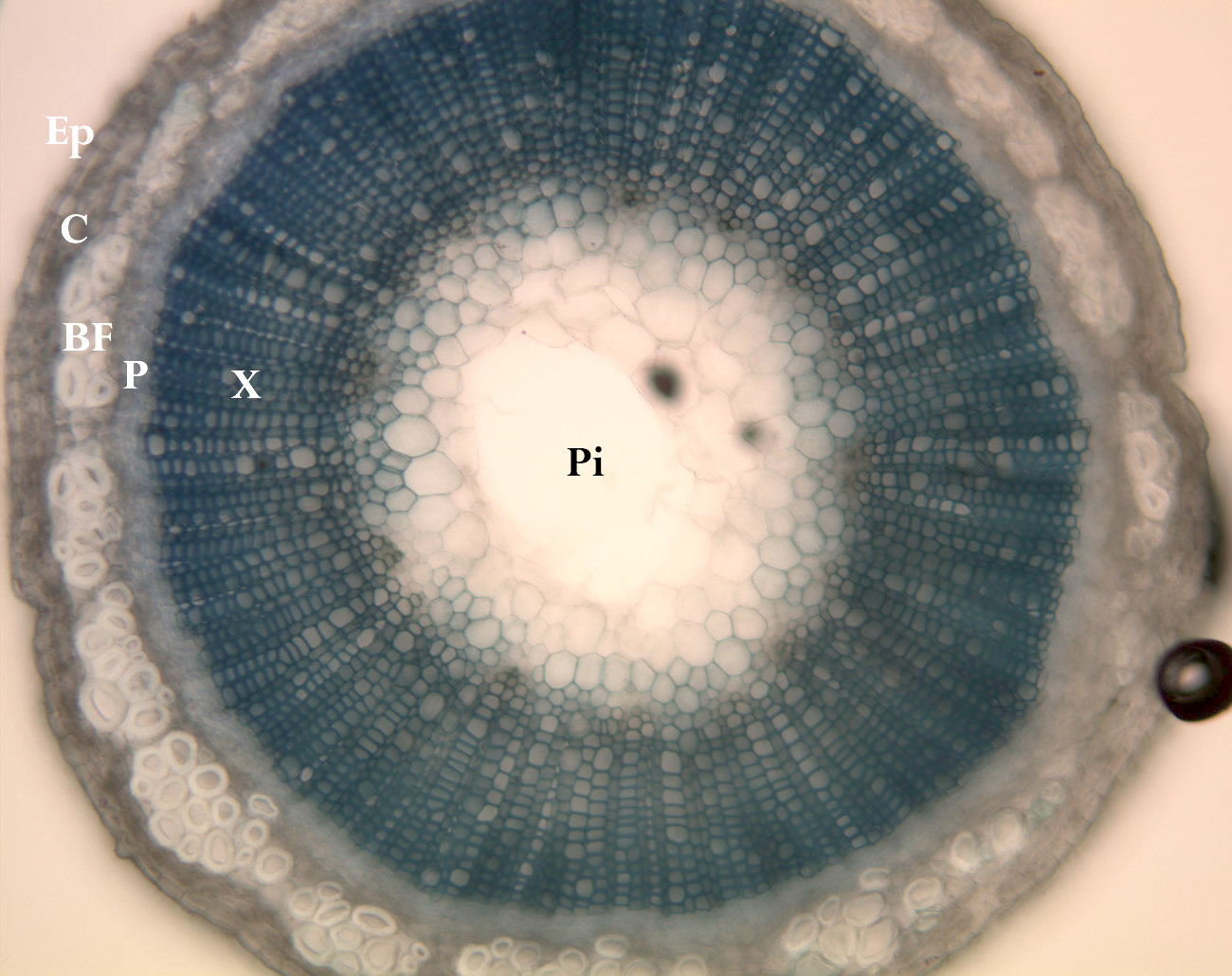
Flax stem cross-section, showing locations of underlying tissues. Ep = epidermis; C = cortex; BF = bast fibres; P = phloem; X = xylem; Pi = pith

Linen is a bast fiber. Flax fibers vary in length from about 25 to 150 mm (1 to 6 in) and average 12–16 micrometers in diameter. There are two varieties: shorter tow fibers used for coarser fabrics and longer line fibers used for finer fabrics. Flax fibers can usually be identified by their "nodes" which add to the flexibility and texture of the fabric.

The cross-section of the linen fiber is made up of irregular polygonal shapes which contribute to the coarse texture of the fabric.

=== Properties ===
Linen fabric feels cool to touch, a phenomenon which indicates its higher thermal conductivity (the same principle that makes metals feel "cold"). It is smooth, making the finished fabric lint-free, and gets softer the more it is washed. However, constant creasing in the same place in sharp folds will tend to break the linen threads. This wear can show up in collars, hems, and any area that is iron creased during laundering. Linen's poor elasticity means that it easily wrinkles.

Mildew, perspiration, and bleach can damage the fabric, but because it is not made from animal fibers (keratin) it is impervious to clothes moths and carpet beetles. Linen is relatively easy to take care of, since it resists dirt and stains, has no lint or pilling tendency, and can be dry-cleaned, machine-washed, or steamed. It can withstand high temperatures, and has only moderate initial shrinkage.

Linen should not be dried too much by tumble drying, and it is much easier to iron when damp. Linen wrinkles very easily, and thus some more formal garments require ironing often, in order to maintain perfect smoothness. Nevertheless, the tendency to wrinkle is often considered part of linen's particular "charm", and many modern linen garments are designed to be air-dried on a good clothes hanger and worn without the necessity of ironing.

A characteristic often associated with linen yarn is the presence of slubs, or small, soft, irregular lumps, which occur randomly along its length. In the past, slubs were traditionally considered to be defects, and were associated with low-quality linen. However, in the case of many present-day linen fabrics, particularly in the decorative furnishing industry, slubs are considered as part of the aesthetic appeal of an expensive natural product. In addition, slubs do not compromise the integrity of the fabric, and therefore they are not viewed as a defect. However, the very finest linen has very consistent diameter threads, with no slubs at all.

Linen can degrade in a few weeks when buried in soil. Linen is more biodegradable than cotton, making it an eco friendly fiber.

=== Measure ===
The standard measure of bulk linen yarn is the "lea", which is the number of yards in a pound of linen divided by 300. For example, a yarn having a size of 1 lea will give 300 yards per pound. The fine yarns used in handkerchiefs, etc. might be 40 lea, and give 40x300 = 12,000 yards per pound. This is a specific length therefore an indirect measurement of the fineness of the linen (i.e. the number of length units per unit mass). The symbol is NeL. The metric unit, Nm, is more commonly used in continental Europe. This is the number of 1,000 m lengths per kilogram. In China, the English Cotton system unit, NeC, is common. This is the number of 840 yard lengths in a pound.

=== Production method ===
Linen is laborious to manufacture.

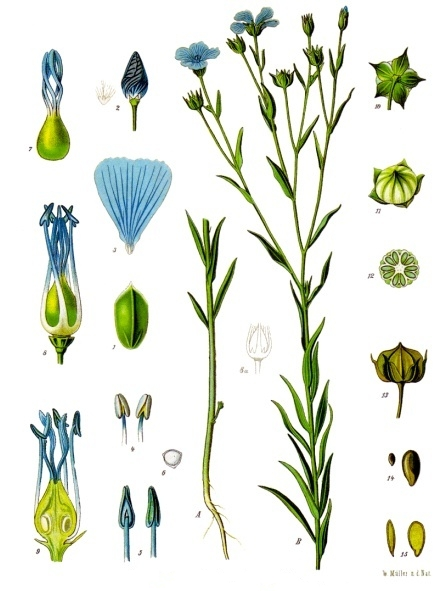
Details of the flax plant, from which linen fibers are derived

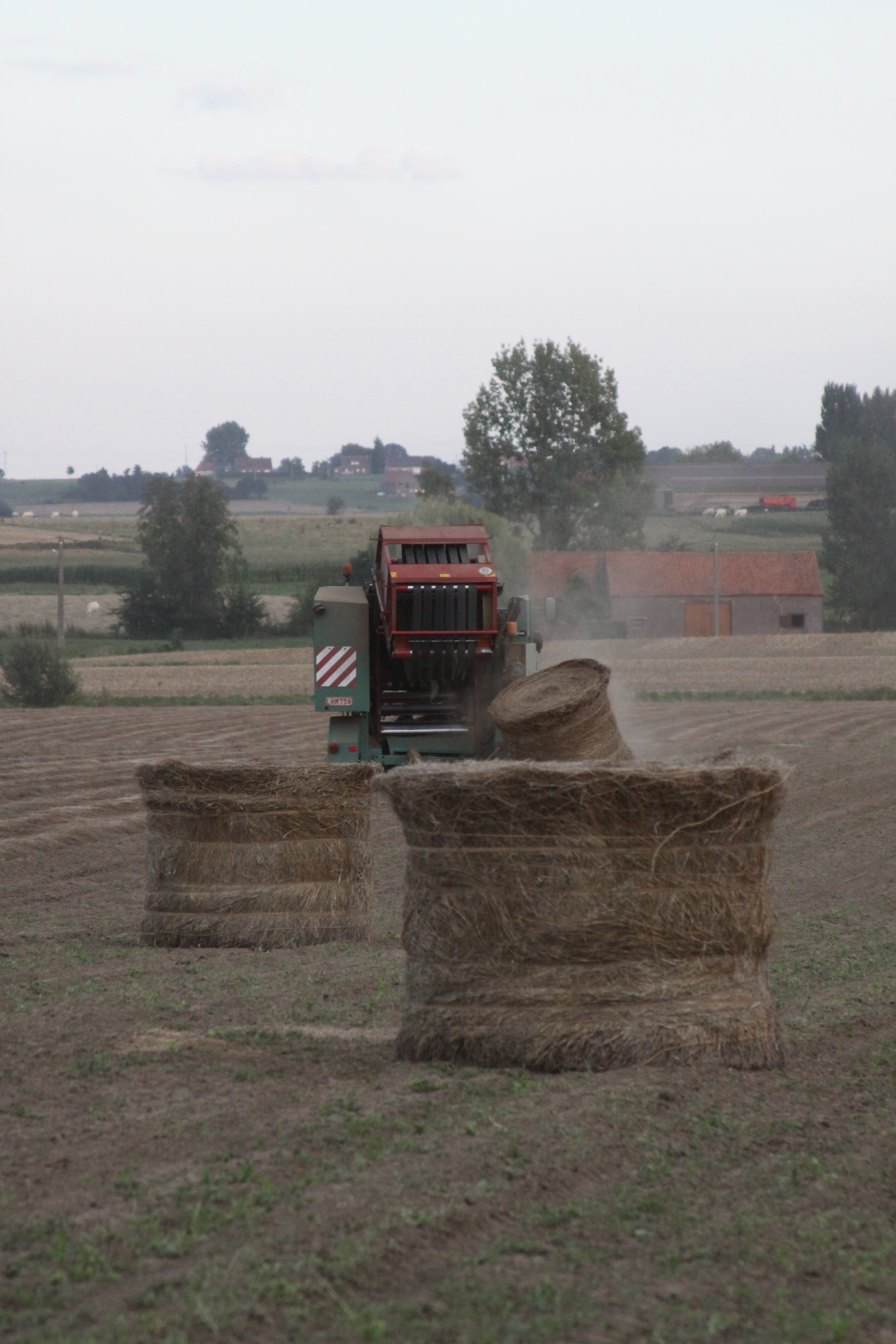
Mechanical baling of flax in Belgium. On the left side, cut flax is waiting to be baled.

The quality of the finished linen product is often dependent upon growing conditions and harvesting techniques. To generate the longest possible fibers, flax is either hand-harvested by pulling up the entire plant or stalks are cut very close to the root. After harvesting, the plants are dried, and then the seeds are removed through a mechanized process called "rippling" (threshing) and winnowing.

Retting, scutching, and heckling (narration in German)

Handweaving of linen (narration in German)

The fibers must then be loosened from the stalk. This is achieved through retting, a process which uses bacteria to decompose the pectin that binds the fibers together. Natural retting methods take place in tanks and pools, or directly in the fields. There are also chemical retting methods; these are faster, but are typically more harmful to the environment and to the fibers themselves.

After retting, the stalks are ready for scutching, which takes place between August and December. Scutching removes the woody portion of the stalks by crushing them between two metal rollers, so that the parts of the stalk can be separated. The fibers are removed and the other parts such as linseed, shives, and tow are set aside for other uses. Next the fibers are heckled: the short fibers are separated with heckling combs by 'combing' them away, to leave behind only the long, soft flax fibers.

After the fibers have been separated and processed, they are typically spun into yarns and woven or knit into linen textiles. These textiles can then be bleached, dyed, printed on, or finished with a number of treatments or coatings.

An alternate production method is known as "cottonizing" which is quicker and requires less equipment. The flax stalks are processed using traditional cotton machinery; however, the finished fibers often lose the characteristic linen look.

=== Producers ===
In 2018, according to the United Nations' repository of official international trade statistics, China was the top exporter of woven linen fabrics by trade value, with a reported $732.3 million in exports; Italy ($173.0 million), Belgium ($68.9 million) and the United Kingdom ($51.7 million) were also major exporters.

== See also ==
- Belgian Linen, a linen known for its high quality
- Butcher's linen, a strong heavy linen cloth, primarily used for butchers' aprons
- Crash (fabric) Crash fabric is coarse linen based rugged material made from both dyed and raw yarns.
- Dornix § Dornick linens, a stout linen table cloth made in Scotland
- Dowlas, a strong linen mentioned by Shakespeare
- Linenize
- Linothorax, armor of layers of linen
- Madapollam, a fabric manufactured from cotton yarn in a linen-style weave
- Pleated linen, a form of processing linen resulting in a fabric which is heavily pleated and does not crease like normal linen fabric
- Ramie, another type of bast fiber with similar properties
- Silesia (cloth), a linen fabric, manufactured in Silesia, a province of Prussia
