= Tow (fibre) =

Coarse and broken fibre

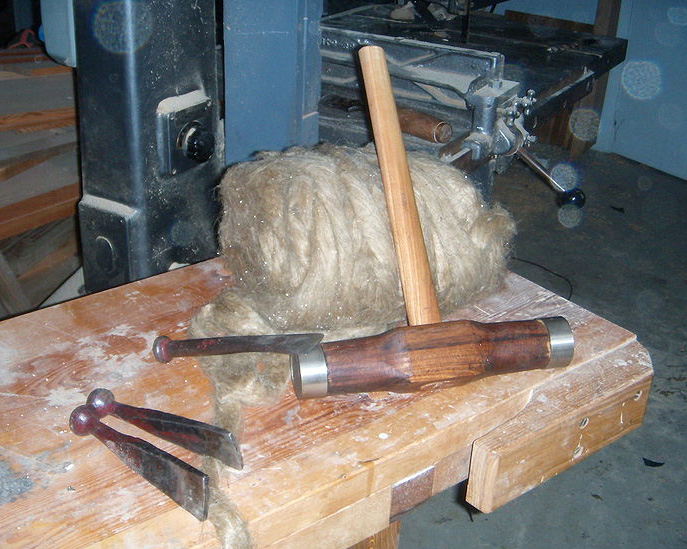
Caulking tools with tow

In the textile industry, a tow (or hards) is a coarse, broken, or short fibre, extracted as a secondary byproduct during the processing of flax, hemp, or jute. It is separated from both the primary long, unbroken fibres (known as line fibre) and the woody inner core (shives) through mechanical processes such as scutching and heckling. Historically, while the highly valued line fibres were reserved for fine linens, the less expensive tow was spun into coarser yarns for everyday utilitarian textiles, ropes, and packing materials. Today, tow is frequently cut up to produce staple fibre or used as upholstery stuffing and oakum. The very light color of flax tow is also the source of the word "towhead", meaning a person with naturally light blond hair.

== Composite materials ==
In the artificial fibre and composites industries, a tow is an untwisted bundle of continuous filaments, in particular of acrylic, carbon fibres, or viscose rayon. Tows are designated either by their total tex (mass in grams per 1000 m length) or by the number of fibres they contain. For example, a 12K tow contains 12,000 fibres.

Spread tow fabrics are woven sheet materials, used for composite layup, where the warp and weft are flat tows, rather than spun yarns, in order to provide the maximum strength as a composite.
