= Helmac =

American clothing care products company

The Evercare Company
- Trade name: The oneCARE Co.
- Formerly: Helmac Products Corporation
- Type: Private
- Industry: Clothing care products; fabric care products
- Founded: 1956; 70 years ago in Flint, Michigan, United States
- Founder: Nicholas D. McKay, Sr.
- Defunct: January 2014
- Fate: Acquired by Bradshaw International
- Headquarters: Alpharetta, Georgia
- Area served: Worldwide
- Products: Lint Pic-Up; Magik Brush
- Brands: Helmac; Evercare

The Helmac Products Corporation was a manufacturer and distributor of clothing care and fabric care products. Founded in 1956 in Flint, Michigan, Helmac was founded by Nicholas D. McKay, Sr. who is credited with inventing the modern lint roller. Helmac manufactured the successful "Lint Pic-Up" lint roller in Flint, Michigan, until 1999 when the company relocated to Georgia. Under the leadership of Nicholas McKay, Jr., Helmac pursued aggressive expansion, introducing dozens of new products and changing its name to Evercare in 2002. The company was eventually acquired by Butler Home Products in 2014, which further integrated with their parent company in 2018 under the name Bradshaw Home. McKay's lint roller design is still produced and sold under the Evercare brand.

== Early history ==
Helmac was founded in 1956 in Flint, Michigan by electrical engineer Nicholas D. McKay. In 1955, while on his way to chaperone a school dance with his wife, Helen, McKay wrapped masking tape around a toilet paper tube and affixed it to a wire coat hanger to remove some lint from his tuxedo. Soon after, he came up with the design for the modern lint roller. He founded the Helmac Products Corporation in 1956 to manufacture and market his new product, the Helmac Lint Pic-Up, for which he received a patent in 1963. The company was named after McKay's wife, Helen (Helmac is a portmanteau of Helen McKay). Helen was involved in the company until her death in 1983.

After originally operating out of McKay's basement, Helmac opened its first dedicated shop in 1962 in downtown Flint. In 1968, it expanded to a newly-constructed factory at 528 Kelso St.

In 1963, McKay partnered with Eric M. Roth to incorporate Helmac-Roth, Ltd. in Toronto, Canada. Helmac-Roth was exporting Lint Pic-Up rollers to more than 16 countries in 1966. Roth eventually left the partnership to form his own company: Roth (Plastics) Corporation.

== Expansion and rebranding ==
In 1993, Harvard Business School graduate, Nicholas McKay Jr., joined the family business with ambitions to expand the company beyond its flagship lint roller product. In the first few years of his tenure at the company, Helmac introduced 50 new products including potpourri, stain remover, and cedar clothing balls, and focused on its existing retail agreements with Kmart and Wal-Mart. McKay Jr. became CEO in 1997.

By its 40-year anniversary in 1996, Helmac had become an international consumer goods company with distribution in 46 countries and had achieved a 92% market share in North America within the clothing care category. Its products were sold in over 120,000 retail locations in the United States. The company established an additional manufacturing facility in Toronto and the headquarters for its European operations (Helmac Products Ltd.) in Southport, England.

In January 1998, the 3M company introduced a competing lint roller product. Facing increased competition, Helmac hired brand consulting firm Landor Associates who advised the company change their name. Landor conducted a survey of consumers and found the word Helmac was associated with concepts that were unrelated to the brand, such as mayonnaise, helmets, and fire and brimstone. As part of its $500,000 fee, Landor proposed the name Evercare, which was found to be associated with the concepts of cleaning products and hygiene. Helmac adopted the brand name Evercare in 1999 and changed their trade name to The Evercare Company in 2002.

Helmac was rapidly outgrowing their 40,000 sq ft manufacturing and distribution facility in Flint. Utilizing three overflow sites added a combined 50,000 sq ft, but required them to contract carriers to move products and materials between facilities. Helmac was unable to come to an agreement with the state of Michigan on tax incentives for a much needed expansion project. Eventually, the company was offered an investment and incentive package by the Georgia Department of Industry, Trade and Tourism. As a result, Helmac relocated its international headquarters to Alpharetta, Georgia, and its main manufacturing facility to Waynesboro beginning in June 2000 and completed two months later.

Helmac experienced complications soon after the move. Of the 25 employees from the management office in Flint, less than 10 relocated to Georgia. Less than a dozen of the original 150 manufacturing plant employees relocated, which included none of the key plant managers. Within the prior eight months, Helmac acquired of the housewares division the textile products company, HBD, and also agreed to become early adopters of a new enterprise resource planning (ERP) software. Barbara Tomaszewski, then Vice President of Distribution, reflected on these factors in an interview in November 2001: "We traditionally have been a very energetic company and have developed the unfortunate habit of biting off more than we can chew."

In January 2001, Helmac hired two consulting firms, PwC and FSL Group, to address software and logistics issues that resulted from the relocation. After two months of consultation work, Helmac's efficiencies had returned to normal, and by June 2001, sales were increasing above forecast values.

At this time, approximately 35% of the company's products were imported from Asia and repackaged with the Evercare brand while 65% were manufactured in the Waynesboro plant, including all of its lint products. In 2003, it was estimated that nine of every ten lint rollers sold worldwide were Helmac's. Annual sales grew from about $10 million at the start of the 1990s at a 21% compounded rate over the next decade.

In 2007, Evercare acquired the company Essaplast and started doing business as The oneCARE Company.

== Dissolution and legacy ==
In 2014, oneCARE was purchased by Butler Home Products, a division of Bradshaw International. Bradshaw International and Butler Home Products consolidated in 2018 under the name Bradshaw Home.

Founder Nicholas McKay Sr. died on November 15, 2014, at the age of 93.
