= Ultrasuede =

Type of synthetic ultra-microfiber fabric

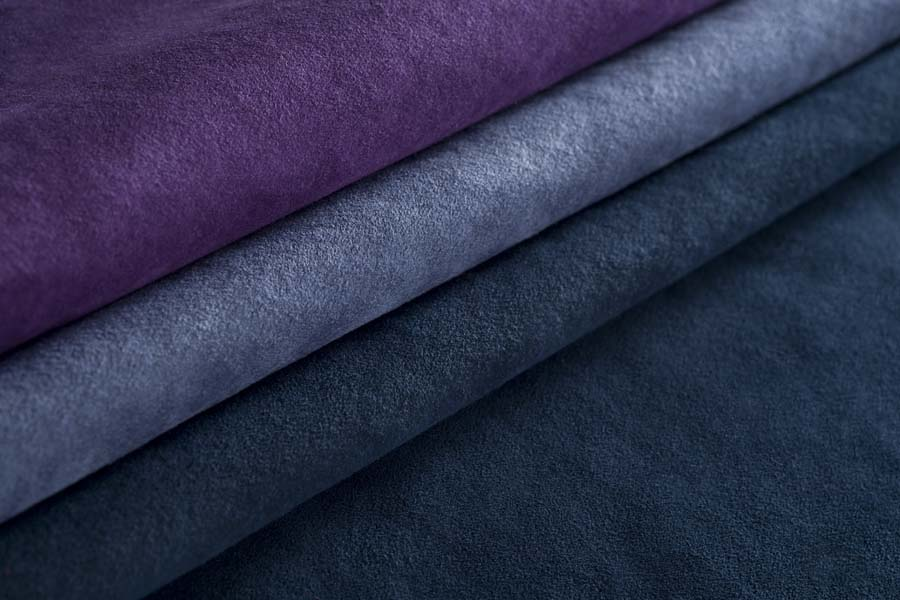
Ecsaine

Ultrasuede is the trade name for a synthetic ultra-microfiber fabric which mimics suede leather. In Japan, it is sold under the brand name Ecsaine. The fabric is used in fashion, interior decorating, automobile and other vehicle upholstery, and industrial applications, such as protective fabric for electronic equipment. It is used to make footbags (also known as hacky sacks) and juggling balls. Other manufacturers such as Sensuede and Majilite also produce similar product lines of synthetic microfiber suede.

== Composition ==
Fabric content ranges from 80% polyester non-woven (100% recycled ultra-microfiber) and 20% non-fibrous polyurethane to 65% polyester and 35% polyurethane, depending on the product line. Ultrasuede feels like natural suede, but it is resistant to stains and discoloration; it can be washed in a washing machine. It has a woven fabric surface, but resists pilling or fraying because it is combined with a polyurethane foam in a non-woven structure. As with its Italian sister fabric, Alcantara, automotive grade Ultrasuede meets OEM specifications and FMVSS302 flammability requirements for automotive use, as well as it being virtually identical on both sides, making it somewhat reversible.

== Uses ==
Ultrasuede has applications in fashion, including shoes; interior furnishing; industrial uses; and (in a flame retardant version) watercraft, automobile and aircraft seating, dash trimming, headliners and other interior panels.
