= Velvet =

Type of pile fabric

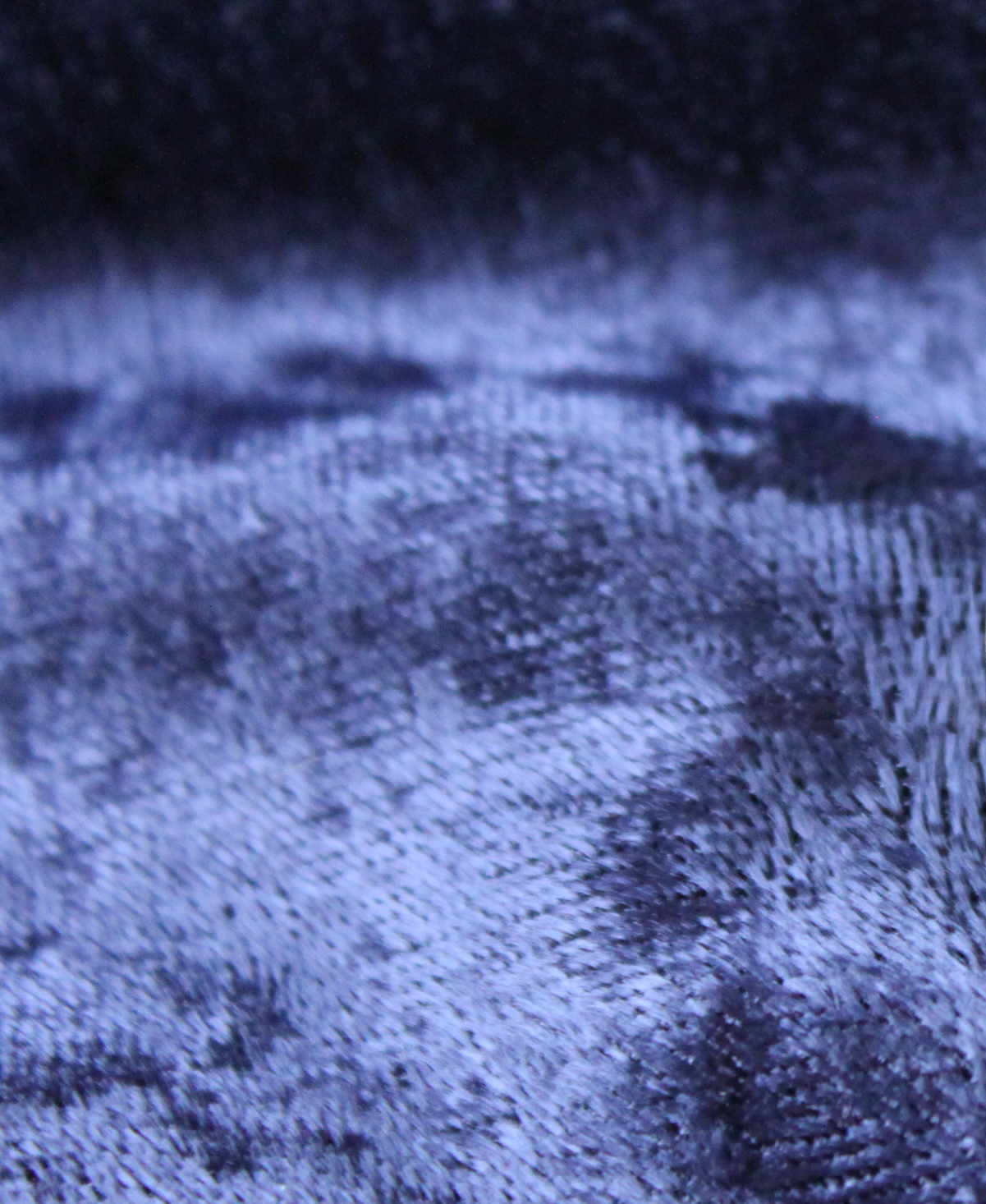
Weave details visible on a purple-colored velvet fabric

Velvet is a type of woven fabric with a dense, even pile that gives it a distinctive soft feel. Historically, velvet was typically made from silk. Modern velvet can be made from silk, linen, cotton, wool, synthetic fibers, silk-cotton blends, or synthetic-natural fiber blends.

== Construction and composition ==
Face-to-face method of weaving. A knife cuts through the middle during weaving to produce two layers of velvet cloth.

Velvet is woven on a special loom that weaves two thicknesses of the material at the same time; the two layers are connected with an extra warp yarn that is woven over rods or wires. The two pieces are then cut apart to create the fabric's pile, and the two lengths of fabric are wound on separate take-up rolls. This complicated process meant that velvet was expensive to make before industrial power looms became available, and well-made velvet remains a fairly costly fabric. Velvet is difficult to clean because of its pile, but modern dry cleaning methods make cleaning more feasible. Velvet pile is created by cutting the warp yarns, while velveteen pile is created by cutting the weft yarns.

Velvet can be made from several different kinds of fibers, the most expensive of which is silk. Much of the velvet sold today as "silk velvet" is a blend of silk and another fiber, often rayon or cotton. Velvet made entirely from silk is rare and usually has market prices of several hundred US dollars per yard. Cotton is also used to make velvet, though this often results in a less luxurious fabric. Velvet can also be made from fibers such as linen, mohair, and wool. A cloth made by the Kuba people of the Democratic Republic of Congo from the raffia palm is often referred to as "Kuba velvet". Modern velvet can be polyester, nylon, viscose, acetate, or blends of synthetics and natural fibers (for example, viscose mixed with silk produces a very soft, reflective fabric). A small percentage of spandex is sometimes added to give the final material a certain amount of stretch (hence "stretch velvet").

Velvet has a thick pile and can be cut 'pile up' or 'pile down' for more shine or more saturated color.

== History ==
Velvet with Medici arms, Florence or Venice, 1440–1500

Because of its unusual softness and appearance as well as its high cost of production, velvet has often been associated with nobility. Velvet was introduced to Baghdad during the rule of Harun al-Rashid (786–809) by Kashmiri merchants and to Al-Andalus by Ziryab. In the Mamluk era, Cairo was the world's largest producer of velvet. Much of it was exported to Venice (whence it spread to most of Europe), Iberia and the Mali Empire. Mansa Musa, the ruler of the Mali Empire, visited Cairo on his pilgrimage to Mecca. Many Arab velvet makers accompanied him back to Timbuktu. Later Ibn Battuta mentions how Suleyman, the ruler of Mali, wore a locally produced complete crimson velvet kaftan on Eid. During the reign of Mehmed II, assistant cooks wore blue dresses (câme-i kebûd), conical hats (کلاه, külâh) and baggy trousers (چاقشیر, çakşır) made from Bursa velvet.

King Richard II of England directed in his will that his body should be clothed in velveto in 1399.

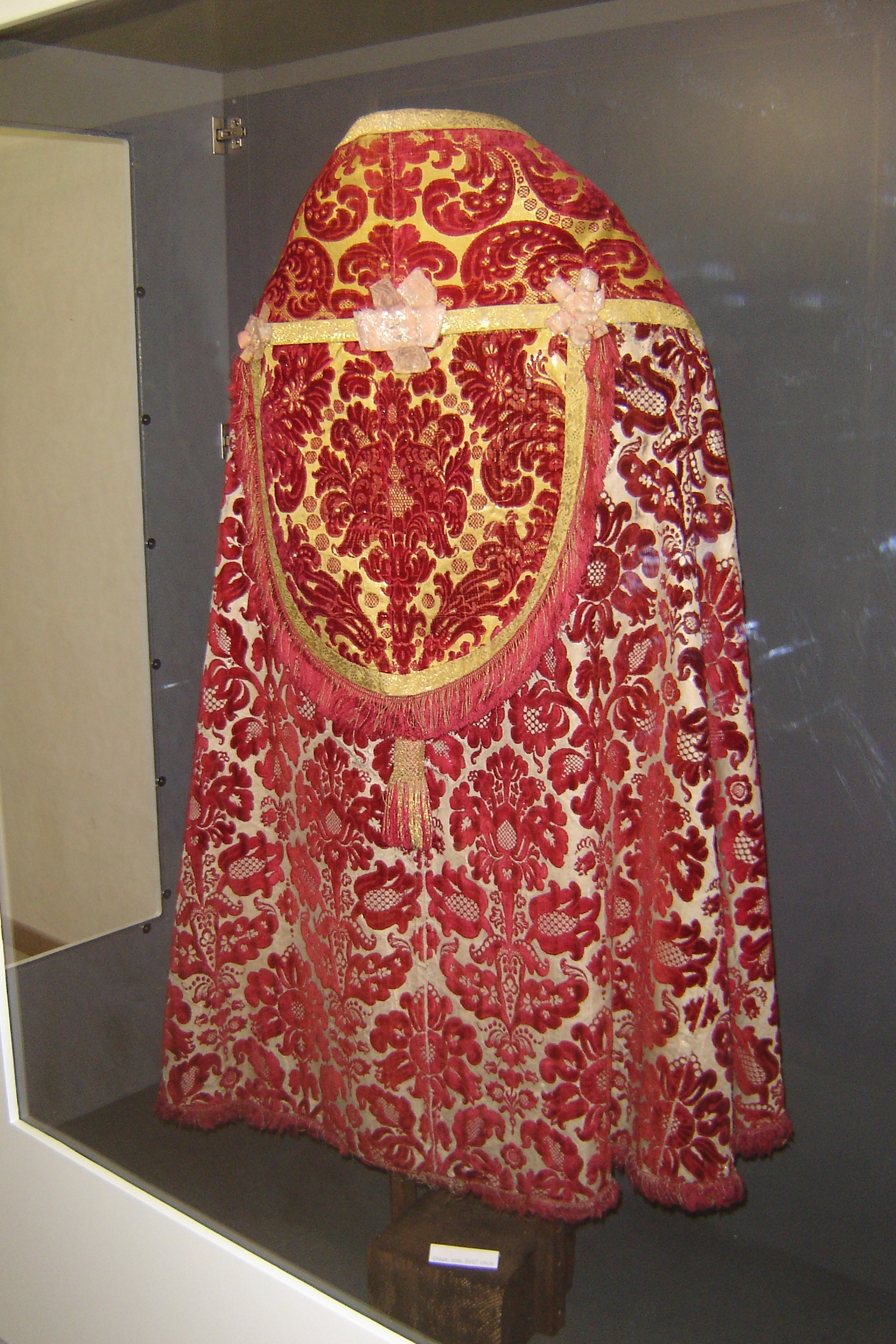
A cope in pile-on-pile velvet

The Encyclopædia Britannica Eleventh Edition described velvet and its history thus:

VELVET, a silken textile fabric having a short dense piled surface. In all probability the art of velvet-weaving originated in the Far East; and it is not till about the beginning of the 14th century that we find any mention of the textile. The peculiar properties of velvet, the splendid yet softened depth of dye-colour it exhibited, at once marked it out as a fit material for ecclesiastical vestments, royal and state robes, and sumptuous hangings; and the most magnificent textures of medieval times were Italian velvets. These were in many ways most effectively treated for ornamentation, such as by varying the colour of the pile, by producing pile of different lengths (pile upon pile, or double pile), and by brocading with plain silk, with uncut pile or with a ground of gold tissue, &c. The earliest sources of European artistic velvets were Catanzaro, Lucca, Genoa, Florence, and Venice, which continued to send out rich velvet textures. Somewhat later the art was taken up by Flemish weavers, and in the sixteenth century, Bruges attained a reputation for velvets that were not inferior to those of the great Italian cities.

Palm fiber fabrics worked like velvets from the Kingdom of Kongo were recorded by Duarte Pacheco Pereira in the early 16th century. He wrote:

...in this kingdom of Kongo they make fabrics with a nap like velvet, some of them worked in velvety satin, so beautiful that nothing finer is made in Italy...

As mechanization was incorporated into the production of textiles in the 19th century, velvet became a more attainable fabric for the middle class. The development of "double velvet" in the 1830s allowed for two pieces of the textile to be woven at the same time on Jacquard looms which doubled the production capacity and cut the previous cost of the textile in half.

== Types ==
Chiffon (or transparent) velvet
very lightweight velvet on a sheer silk or rayon chiffon base.
Ciselé
velvet where the pile uses cut and uncut loops to create a pattern.
Crushed
lustrous velvet with patterned appearance that is produced by either pressing the fabric down in different directions, or alternatively by mechanically twisting the fabric while wet.
Devoré or burnout
a velvet treated with a caustic solution to dissolve areas of the pile, creating a velvet pattern upon a sheer or lightweight base fabric.
Embossed
velvet on which a metal roller has been used to heat-stamp the fabric, producing a pattern.
Hammered
an extremely lustrous velvet with a crushed and dappled appearance.
Lyons
a densely woven, stiff, heavier-weight pile velvet used for hats, coat collars and garments.
Mirror
a type of exceptionally soft and light crushed velvet.
Nacré
velvet with an effect similar to shot silk where the pile is woven in one or more colours and the base fabric in another, creating a changeable, iridescent effect.
Panne
a type of crushed velvet produced by forcing the pile in a single direction by applying heavy pressure. Sometimes, less frequently, called paon velvet. However, since the 1970s, "panne velvet" as used in ordinary fabric stores has referred to a pile knit, perhaps better called a velour, with a short pile that falls in many directions; usually of polyester.
Pile-on-pile, also called double velvet
a particularly luxurious type of velvet woven with piles of differing heights to create a pattern. It is one of the oldest known velvet weaving techniques.
Plain
velvet commonly made of cotton with a firm hand.
Ponson
A very heavy and quite expensive velvet made either entirely with silk or having a pile exclusively of silk, used at one point for women's dresses and cloaks
Utrecht
a pressed and crimped velvet associated with Utrecht, the Netherlands.
Voided
velvet deliberately woven with areas of pile-free ground (usually satin) forming a pattern.
Wedding ring or ring velvet
another term for devoré and/or chiffon velvets which are allegedly fine enough to be drawn through a wedding ring.

== Fibers ==
Cotton
Cotton velvet is highly durable, but lacks much of the luxuriousness of other varieties of velvet, and its colors tend not to be as deep or rich
Silk
Silk velvet is one of the more expensive kinds of velvet, and is usually shinier and softer than the cotton variety
Microfiber
Microfiber velvet is a synthetic polyester variety of the fabric that resists stains easily and is lightweight
Nylon/rayon blend
Nylon/rayon blend velvet has much of the feel and drape of silk-based velvet, but is usually much less expensive; also, it is easier to care for than silk velvet
Polyester/spandex
Polyester/spandex velvet (often called "stretch velvet") can be made of polyester with a small percentage of spandex to allow it to stretch in one or two directions
Viscose
In terms of quality, viscose velvet is more similar to silk velvet than cotton velvet as it is softer and richer than the cotton

== Gallery ==
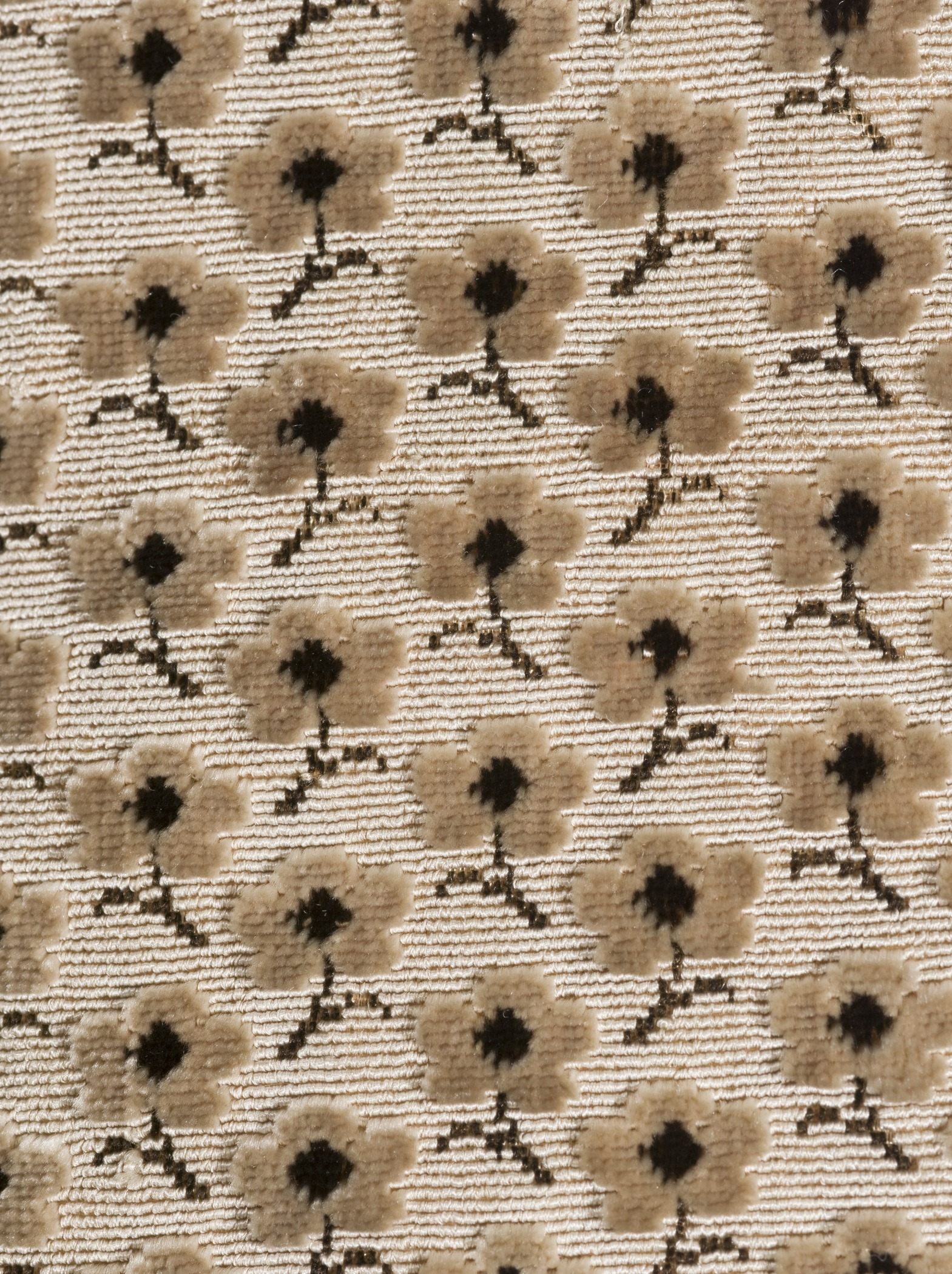
Ciselé

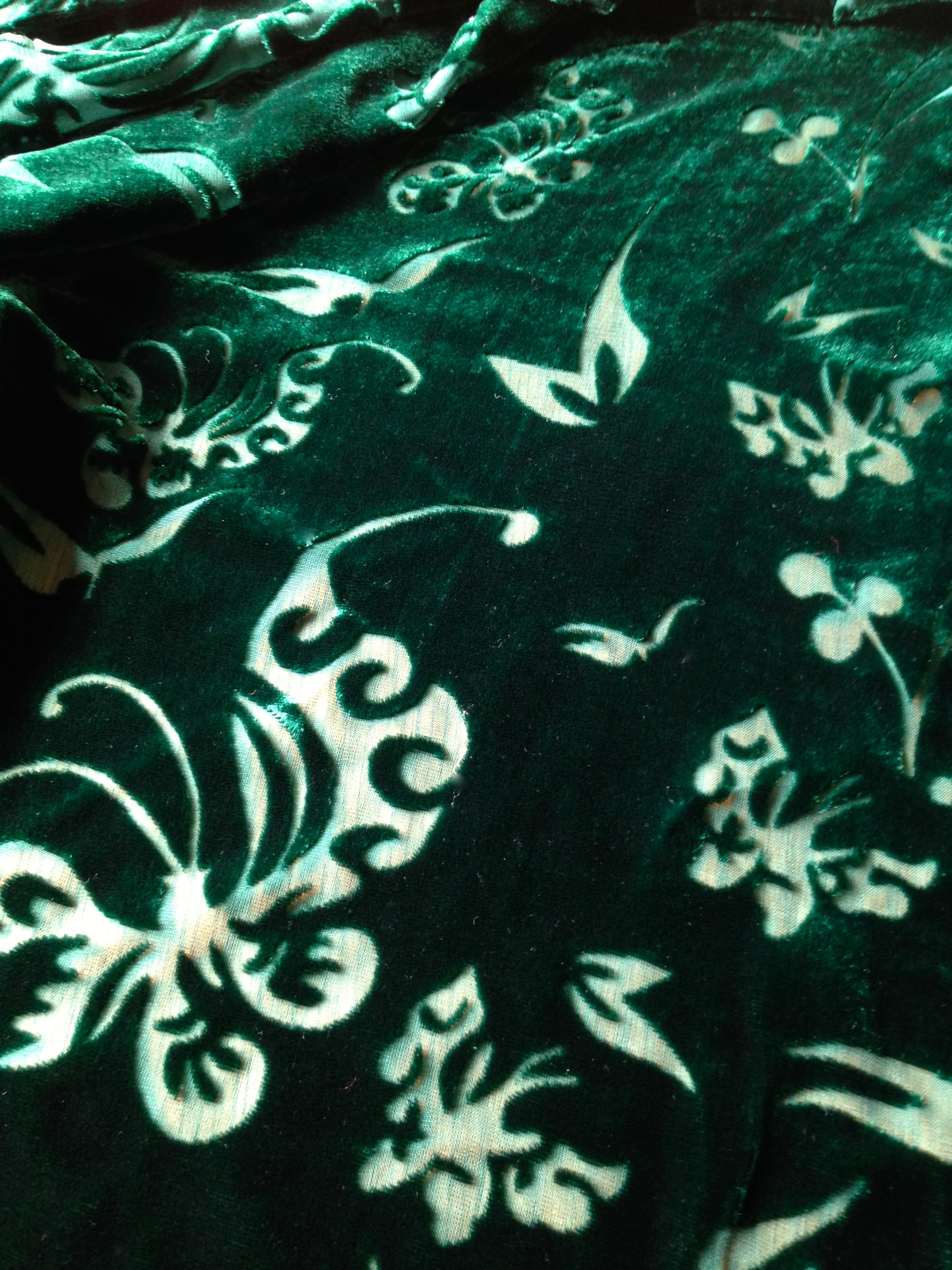
Devoré

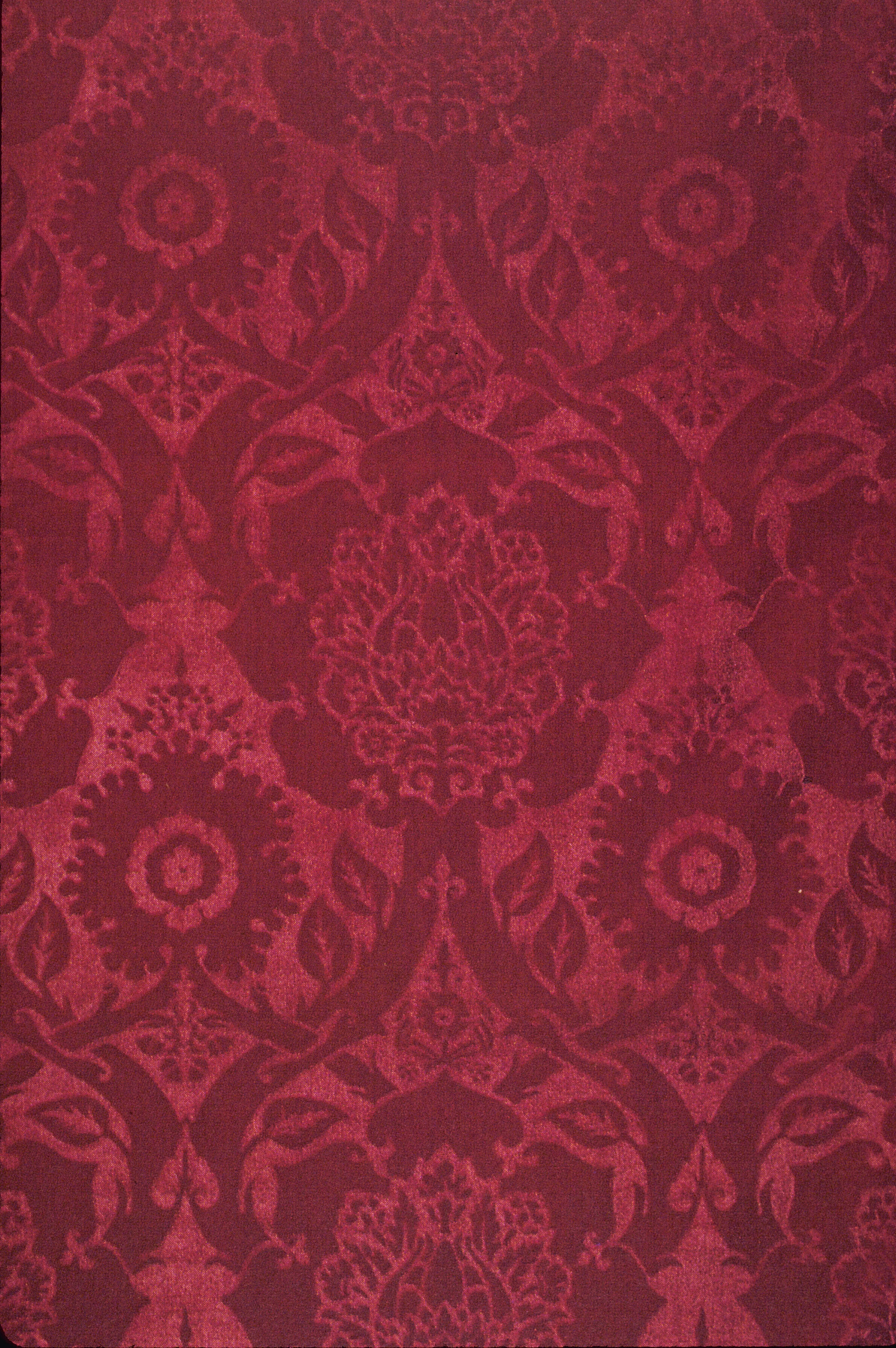
Embossed

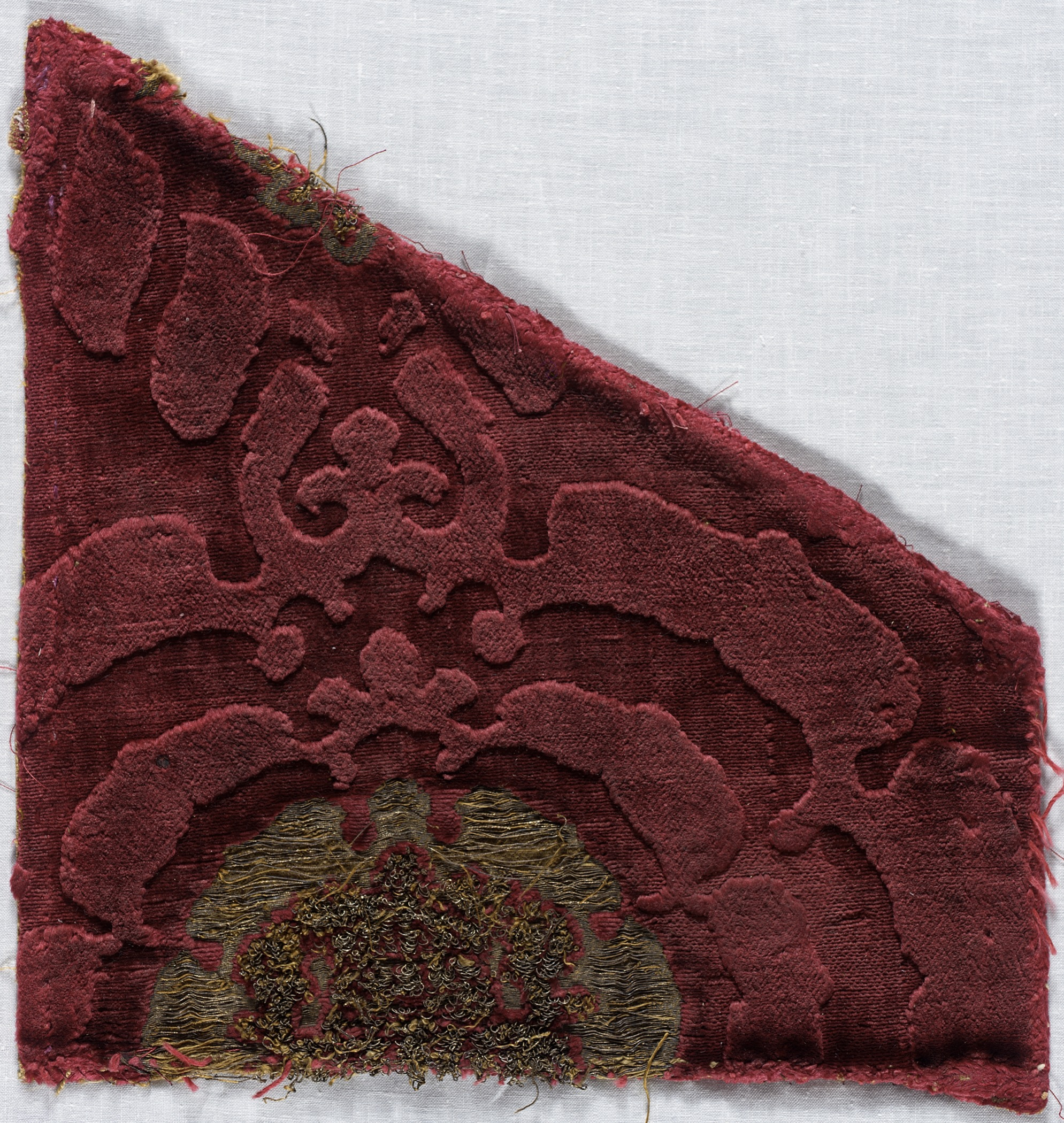
Pile-on-pile

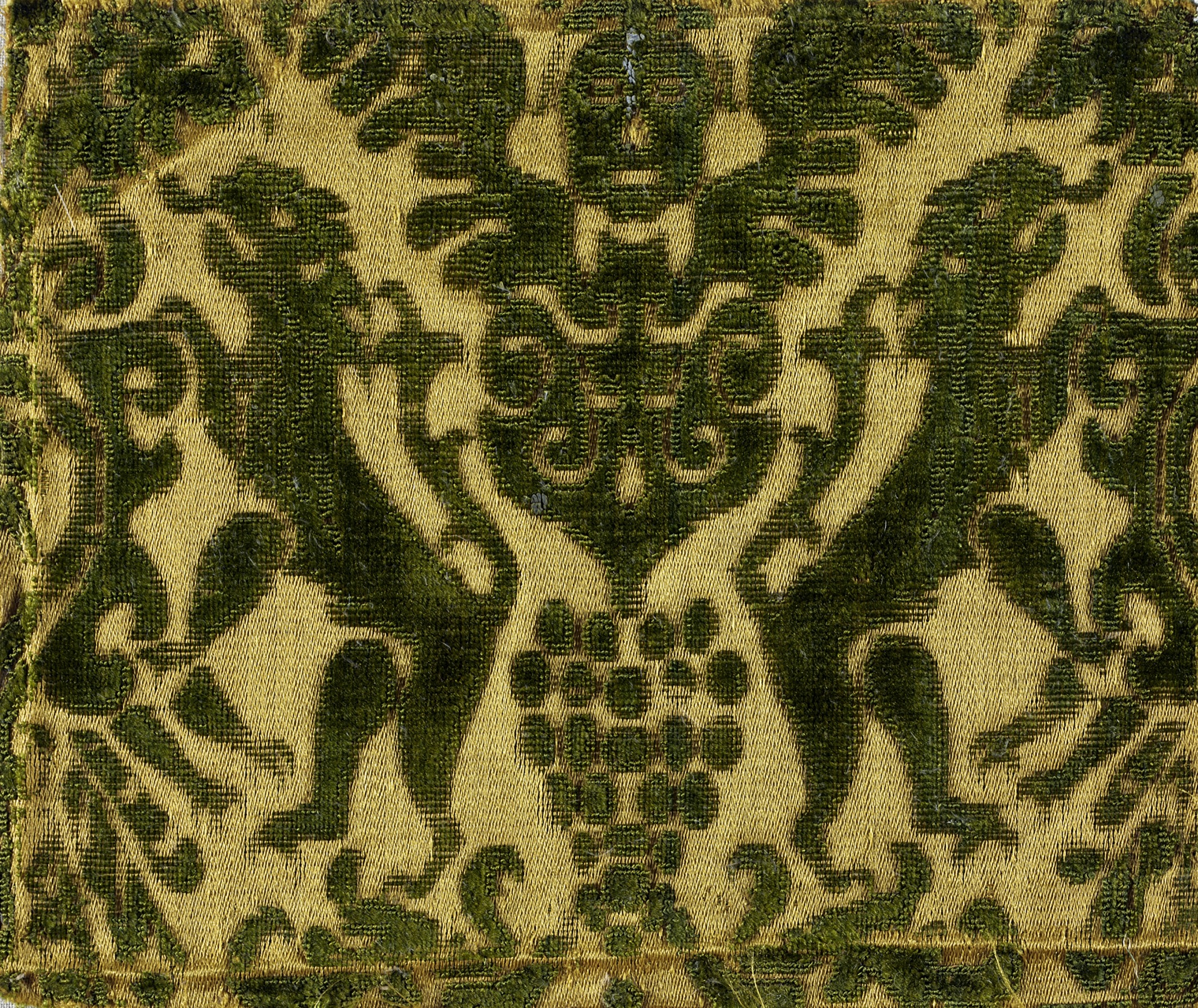
Voided

== See also ==
- Corduroy
- Flocking (texture)
- Terrycloth
- Velour
- Velvet painting
- Velveteen
- Velvet (given name)
