= Brassic (disambiguation) =

Brassic is a British comedy series.

Boracic may also refer to:

- Boracic lint, medical dressing made from surgical lint
- "Brassic", Cockney rhyming slang for "skint" (i.e. penniless)
