= Goodcook =

Brand of kitchenware products

goodcook
- Current owner: Bradshaw International
- Country: United States
- Introduced: 1987
- Markets: Kitchenware
- Website: www.goodcook.com

goodcook is a brand of kitchenware products owned by Bradshaw International. The brand was founded in 1987.

== History ==
In November 2020, goodcook formed a partnership with Gemma’s Bigger Bolder Baking to launch Everything You Need To Know About Bakeware.

== Products ==
The brand consists of kitchenware. The company release a brand of water bottles called GoBottle and Good Cook Food Storage Value Pack.

In 2004, the brand "captured 43% of the nationwide market for kitchenware sold at supermarkets and drug stores - inventory for all of which will pass through the headquarters complex when the operation is at 100 percent by the end of March". The brand is sold at "Albertsons, Food 4 Less, Gelsons, Harman's, Kitchen Collection, Raley's, Safeway, Sav-on Drug, Stater Brothers and Vons".

Christina Hitchcock, a food blogger from Pennsylvania, was picked up as a kitchen expert by GoodCook.
