= Microfiber =

Synthetic fiber

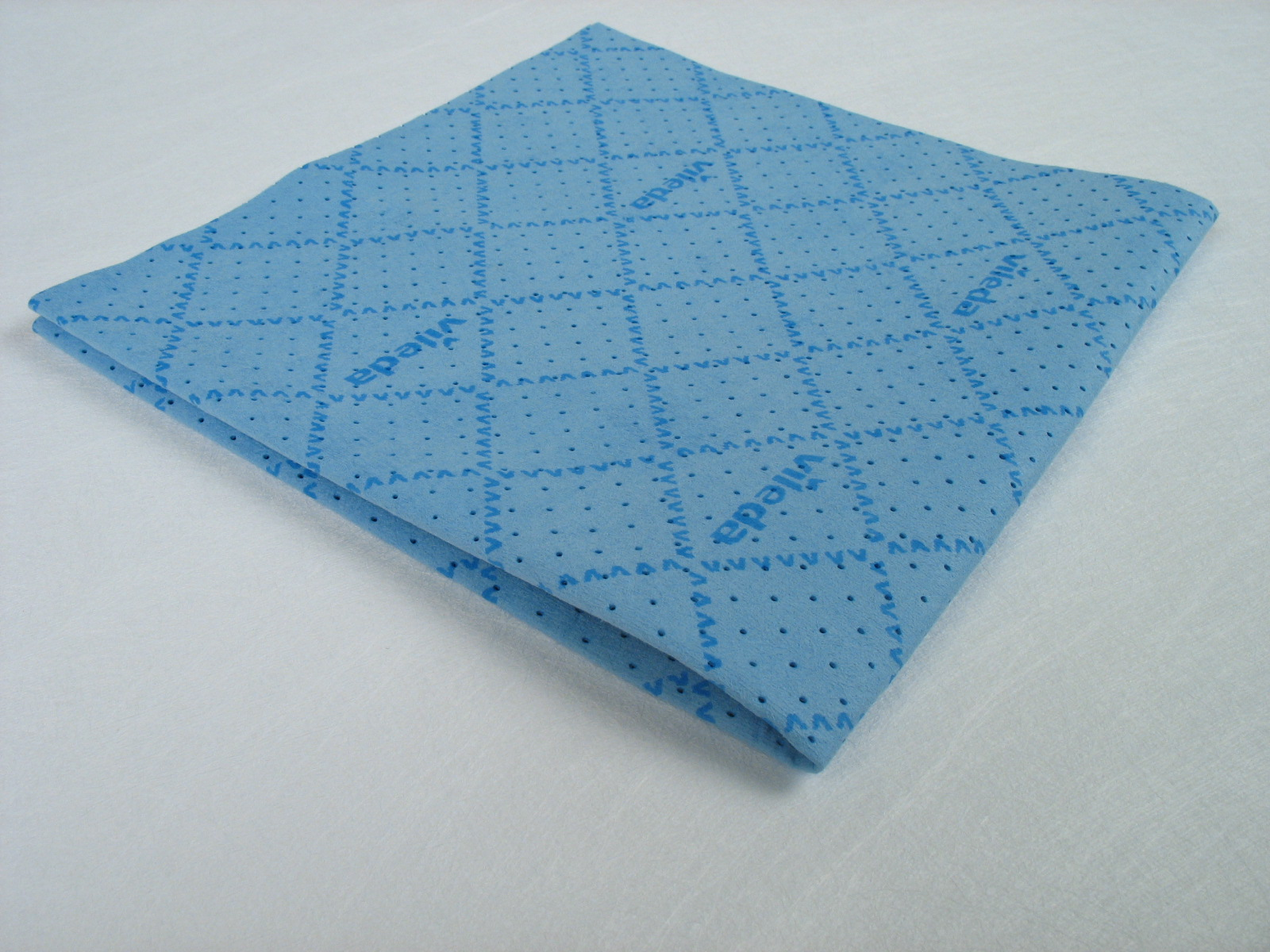
Microfiber cloth suitable for cleaning sensitive surfaces

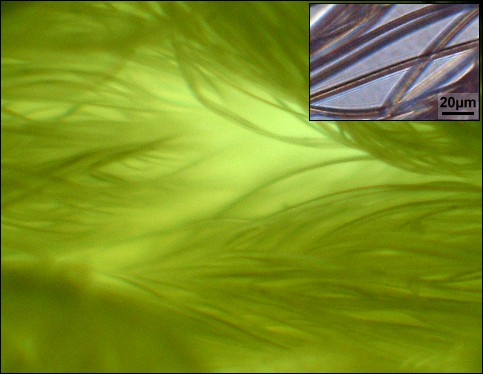
Microscopic view of a microfiber cloth

Microfiber (US English) or microfibre (UK English) is a synthetic fiber made of threads finer than one denier or one detex with a diameter of less than ten micrometers.

The most common types of microfiber cloth are made of polyesters, polyamides (e.g., nylon, Kevlar, Nomex), and combinations of polyester, polyamide, and polypropylene. Microfiber cloth is used to make mats, knits, and weaves, for apparel, upholstery, industrial filters, and cleaning products. The shape, size, and combinations of synthetic fibers are chosen for specific characteristics, including softness, toughness, absorption, water repellence, electrostatics, and filtering ability.

Microfiber cloth is used to clean scratch-prone surfaces such as display devices, glass, and lenses. Microfiber cloth makes use of van der Waals force to remove dirt without scratches.

== History ==
Production of ultra-fine fibers (finer than 0.7 denier) dates to the late 1950s, using melt-blown spinning and flash spinning techniques. Initially, only fine staples of random length could be manufactured and very few applications were found. Then came experiments to produce ultra-fine fibers of a continuous filament: the most promising experiments were made in Japan in the 1960s, by Miyoshi Okamoto, a scientist at Toray Industries. Okamoto's discoveries and those of Toyohiko Hikota led to many industrial applications, including Ultrasuede, one of the first successful synthetic microfibers, which entered the market in the 1970s. Microfiber's use in the textile industry then expanded. Microfibers were first publicized in the early 1990s, in Sweden, and saw success as a product in Europe over the course of the decade.

== Preparation of microfibers ==
Illustration of the cross section of an "orange" bicomponent filament before splitting. The red (1) is often nylon while the black (2) is often polyester.

Microfibers are produced either by twisting long extruded continuous filaments or by combining small staple fibers using heat and/or force. Continuous filaments can either be single component, most often polyester, or bicomponent fiber, most often polyester and polyamide (nylon). To make even smaller fibers, bicomponent fibers are often split.

Splitting bicomponent fibers is accomplished by making filaments out of incompatible polymers (e.g. polyester and nylon) and then separating them using physical or chemical treatments. The cross section of the materials in the filament before separating may look like the cross section of an orange, lending them the name, "orange bico fibers." Another bicomponent continuous filament microfiber production method, called island-in-sea, involves extruding "islands" of thin polymer fibers (often polyester, nylon, or both) in a sacrificial "sea" matrix which is later dissolved away using a solvent, leaving only the thin "island" strands behind.

== Apparel ==
=== Clothing ===
Microfiber fabrics are synthetic and frequently used for athletic wear, such as cycling jerseys, because the microfiber material wicks moisture (perspiration) away from the body; subsequent evaporation cools the wearer.

Microfiber can be used to make tough, very soft fabric for clothing, often used in skirts, jackets, bathrobes, and swimwear. Microfiber can be made into Ultrasuede, a synthetic imitation of suede leather, which is cheaper and easier to clean and sew than natural suede leather.

=== Accessories ===
Microfiber is used to make many accessories that traditionally have been made from leather: wallets, handbags, backpacks, book covers, shoes, cell phone cases, and coin purses. Microfiber fabric is lightweight, durable, and somewhat water repellent, so it makes a good substitute.

Another advantage of microfiber fabric (compared to leather) is that it can be coated with various finishes and can be treated with antibacterial chemicals. Fabric can also be printed with various designs, embroidered with colored thread, and heat-embossed.

== Other uses ==
=== Textiles for cleaning ===
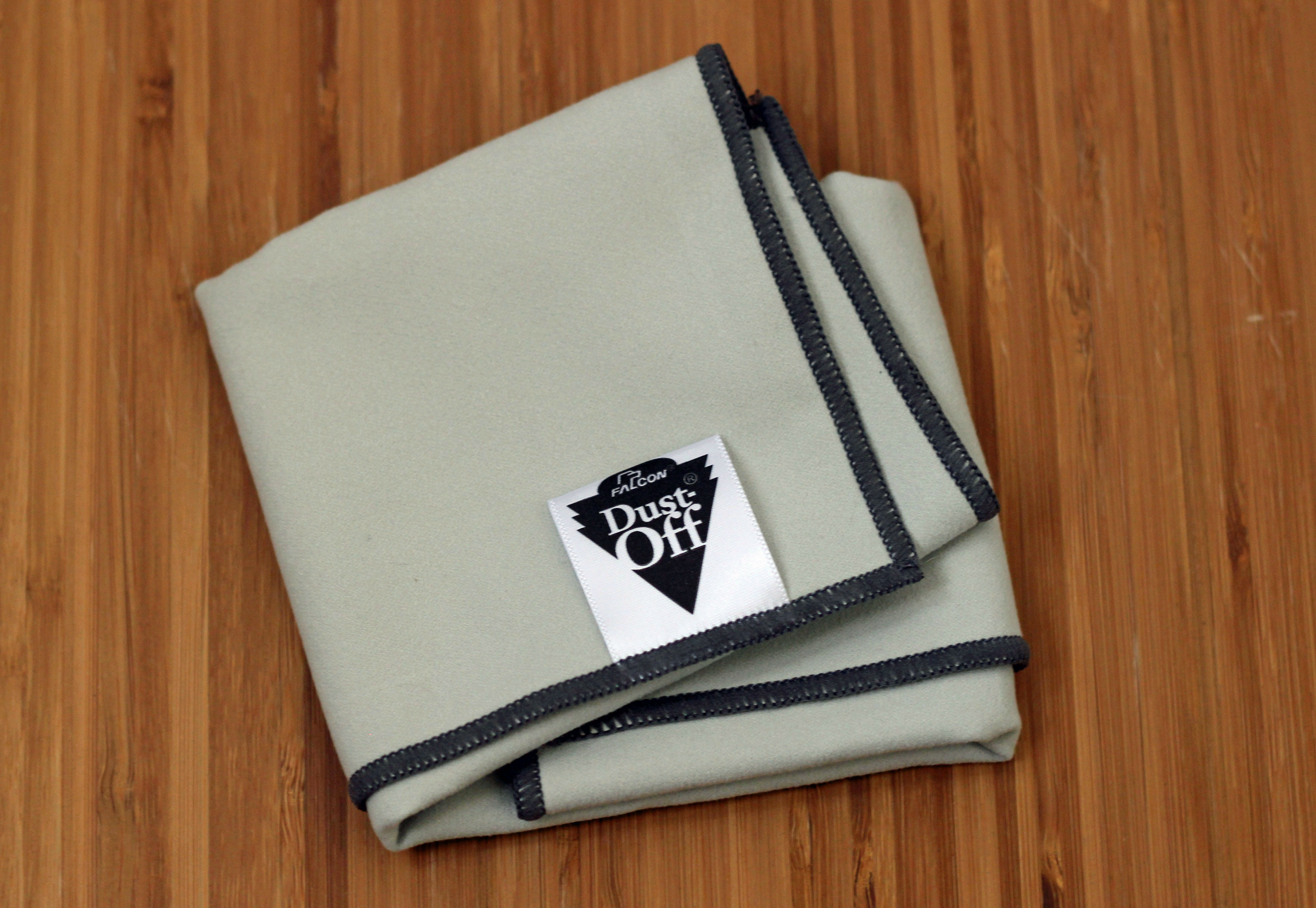
Microfiber cloth for cleaning screens and lenses

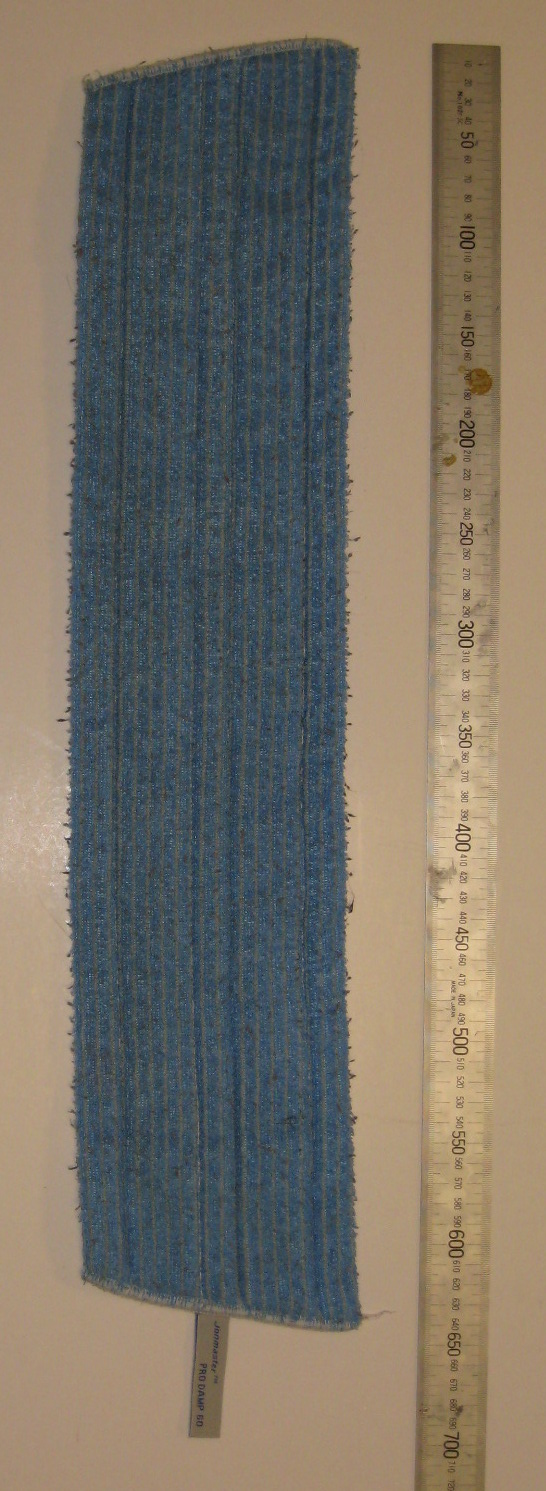
Microfiber mop with Velcro back for fastening on handle

Reusable microfiber cloths for cleaning are most often made of split bicomponent fibers. The split fibers and the size of the individual filaments make the cloths more effective than other fabrics for cleaning purposes. The structure traps and retains the dirt and also absorbs liquids. Unlike cotton, microfiber leaves no lint, the exception being some micro suede blends, where the surface is mechanically processed to produce a soft plush feel.

For microfiber to be most effective as a cleaning product, especially for water-soluble soils and waxes, it should be a split microfiber. Non-split microfiber is little more than a very soft cloth. The main exception is for cloths used for facial cleansing and for the removal of skin oils (sebum), sunscreens, and mosquito repellents from optical surfaces such as cameras, phones and eyeglasses wherein higher-end proprietary woven, 100% polyester cloths using 2 μm filaments, will absorb these types of oils without smearing.

Microfiber used in non-sports-related clothing, furniture, and other applications is not split because it is not designed to be absorbent, just soft. When buying, microfiber may not be labeled to designate whether it is split. One method to determine the type of microfiber is to run the cloth over the palm of the hand. A split microfiber will cling to imperfections of the skin and can be either heard or felt as it does. Alternatively, a small amount of water can be poured onto a hard, flat surface and pushed with the microfiber. If the water is pushed rather than absorbed, it is not split microfiber.

Microfiber can be electrostatically charged for special purposes like filtration.

=== Cloths and mops ===
Microfiber products used for consumer cleaning are generally constructed from split conjugated fibers of polyester and polyamide. Microfiber used for commercial cleaning products also includes many products constructed of 100% polyester. Microfiber products are able to absorb oils especially well and are not hard enough to scratch even paintwork unless they have retained grit or hard particles from previous use. Due to hydrogen bonding, microfiber cloth containing polyamide absorbs and holds more water than other types of fibers.

Microfiber is widely used by car detailers to handle tasks such as removing wax from paintwork, quick detailing, interior cleaning, glass cleaning, and drying. Because of their fine fibers which leave no lint or dust, microfiber towels are used by car detailers and enthusiasts in a similar manner to a chamois leather.

Microfiber is used in many professional cleaning applications, for example in mops and cleaning cloths. Although microfiber mops cost more than non-microfiber mops, they may be more economical because they last longer and require less effort to use.

Microfiber textiles designed for cleaning do so on a microscopic scale. According to tests, using microfiber materials to clean a surface reduces bacteria by 99%, whereas a conventional cleaning material reduces bacteria by only 33%. Microfiber cleaning tools also absorb fat and grease and their electrostatic properties allow them to attract dust strongly.

Microfiber cloths are also used to clean photographic lenses as they absorb oily matter without being abrasive or leaving a residue, and are sold by major manufacturers such as Sinar, Zeiss, Nikon and Canon. Small microfiber cleaning cloths are commonly sold for cleaning computer screens, cameras, phones and eyeglasses.

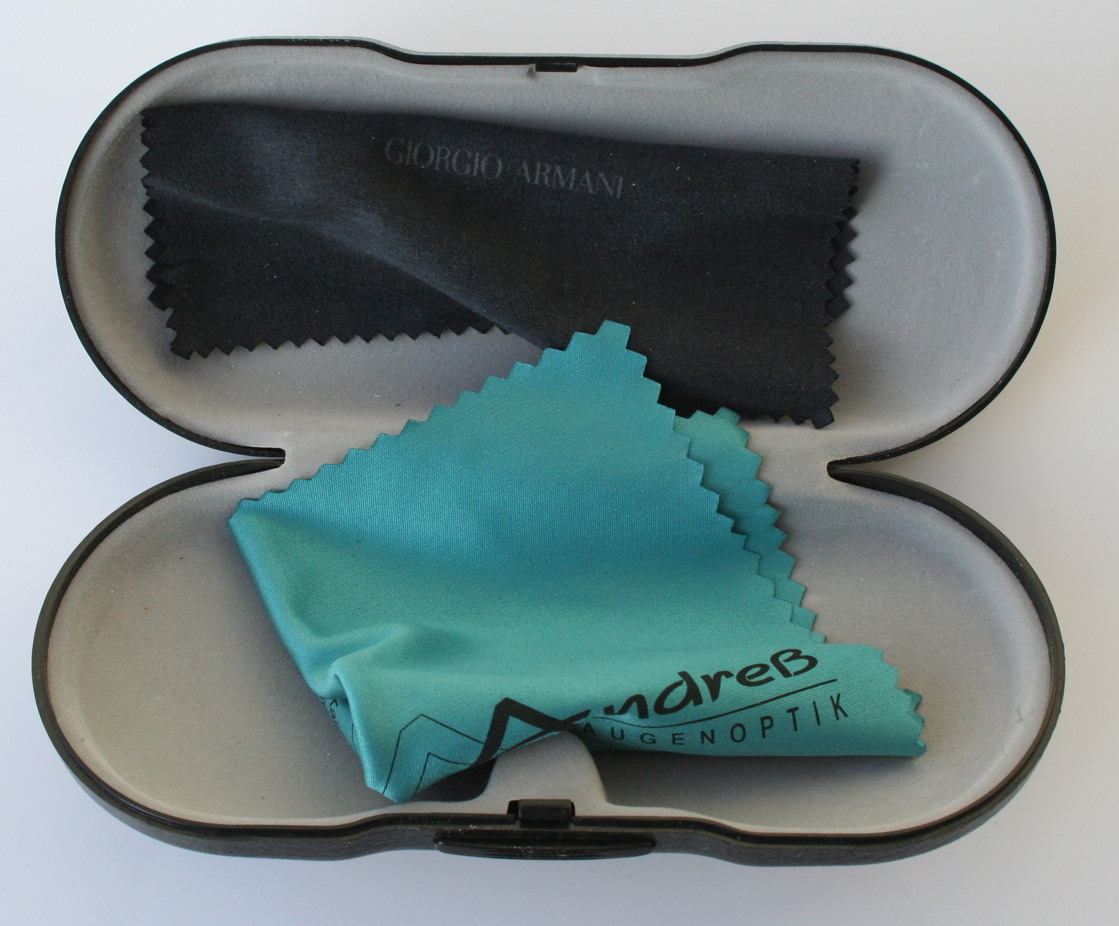
Cloth for cleaning glasses

Microfiber is unsuitable for some cleaning applications as it accumulates dust, debris, and particles. Sensitive surfaces (such as all high-tech coated surfaces e.g. CRT, LCD and plasma screens) can easily be damaged by a microfiber cloth if it has picked up grit or other abrasive particles during use. One way to minimize the risk of damage to flat surfaces is to use a flat, non-rugged microfiber cloth, as these tend to be less prone to retaining grit.

Rags made of microfiber must only be washed with regular laundry detergent, not oily, self-softening, soap-based detergents. Fabric softener must not be used; the oils and cationic surfactants in the softener and self-softening detergents will clog up the fibers and make them less absorbent until the oils are washed out. Hot temperatures may also cause microfiber cloth to melt or become wrinkled.

=== Insulation ===
Microfiber materials such as PrimaLoft are used for thermal insulation as a replacement for down feather insulation in sleeping bags and outdoor equipment, because of their better retention of heat when damp or wet. Microfiber is also used for water insulation in automotive car covers. Depending on the technology the fiber manufacturer is using, such material may contain from 2 up to 5 thin layers, merged. Such combination ensures not only high absorption factor, but also breathability of the material, which prevents the greenhouse effect.

=== Basketballs ===
The NBA introduced a microfiber ball for the 2006–07 season following its introduction by FIBA. The ball, manufactured by Spalding, did not require a leather ball's "break-in" period of use. Microfiber has the ability to absorb water and oils, making the ball less slippery as sweat from players touching the ball is better absorbed. Over the course of the season, the league received many complaints from players who found that the ball bounced differently from leather balls, and that it left cuts on their hands. On January 1, 2007, the league scrapped the use of all microfiber balls and returned to leather basketballs.

=== Other ===
Microfibers used in tablecloths, furniture, and car interiors are designed to repel wetting and consequently are difficult to stain. In furniture, microfiber is a close alternative to leather due to the simple upkeep of the qualities of the material. Easy to wipe off liquids and better suited for individuals with pets. Microfiber tablecloths will bead liquids until they are removed and are sometimes advertised showing red wine on a white tablecloth that wipes clean with a paper towel. This and the ability to mimic suede economically are common selling points for microfiber upholstery fabrics (e.g., for couches).

Microfibers are used in towels especially those to be used at swimming pools as even a small towel dries the body quickly. They dry quickly and are less prone than cotton towels to become stale if not dried immediately. Microfiber towels need to be soaked in water and pressed before use, as they would otherwise repel water as microfiber tablecloths do.

Microfiber is also used for other applications such as making menstrual pads, cloth diaper inserts, body scrubbers, face mitts, whiteboard cleaners, and various goods that need to absorb water and/or attract small particles.

In the medical world, the properties of microfibers are used in the coating of certain fabric sheets used to strengthen the original material.

== Environmental and safety issues ==
Microfiber textiles tend to be flammable if manufactured from hydrocarbons (polyester) or carbohydrates (cellulose) and emit toxic gases when burning, more so if aromatic (PET, PS, ABS) or treated with halogenated flame retardants and azo dyes. Their polyester and nylon stock are made from petrochemicals, which are not a renewable resource and are not biodegradable.

For most cleaning applications they are designed for repeated use rather than being discarded after use. An exception to this is the precise cleaning of optical components where a wet cloth is drawn once across the object and must not be used again as the debris collected are now embedded in the cloth and may scratch the optical surface.

Microfiber products also enter the oceanic water supply and food chain similarly to other microplastics. Synthetic clothing made of microfibers that are washed release materials and travel to local wastewater treatment plants, contributing to plastic pollution in water. A study by the clothing brand Patagonia and University of California, Santa Barbara, found that when synthetic jackets made of microfibers are washed, on average 1.7 grams (0.060 oz) of microfibers are released from the washing machine. These microfibers then travel to local wastewater treatment plants, where up to 40% of them enter into rivers, lakes, and oceans where they contribute to the overall plastic pollution. Microfibers account for 85% of man-made debris found on shorelines worldwide. Fibers retained in wastewater treatment sludge (biosolids) that are land-applied can persist in soils.

== Regulations ==
=== United States ===
In 2018, the state of California passed a bill which would mandate that all clothes made with 50%+ polyester have warning labels regarding microfiber shedding in laundry. Then in 2024, the state passed a bill mandating that all new washing machines in California must have microfiber filtration systems from 2029 and on.

In 2018, the New York State Assembly passed a bill that would require clothing made with 50%+ polyester and other synthetic fibers to be issued a warning label that they contain microfibers.

In 2018, the Connecticut General Assembly passed 2 bills that would educate consumers on the dangers of microfibers through awareness camps and programs.

There are currently no substantial nationwide regulations for microfiber pollution from laundry.However, in recent years, there have been more serious efforts done to regulate microfiber pollution nationwide, especially as household laundry has become an ever more known source of the issue. In 2020, then President Donald Trump signed into law the Save Our Seas 2.0 act, and in it the Interagency Marine Debris Coordinating Committee (IMDCC) to release a report on microfiber pollution and how the government could take measures to reduce the issue. There has also been legislation introduced to take a harder approach against microfiber pollution, with congressman Mike Levin introducing the "Fighting Fibers Act of 2025" in July 2025, which if passed would require all washing machines nationwide to have microfiber filtration systems installed by 2030.

In 2023, the U.S. Environmental Protection agency had proposed multiple solutions to the issue of microfibers including reducing laundry emissions, creating non-degradable textiles, and containing microfibers in areas that prevent them from escaping into the environment.

== See also ==
- Polyamide
- Polyester
- Polar fleece
