= Velvet (given name) =

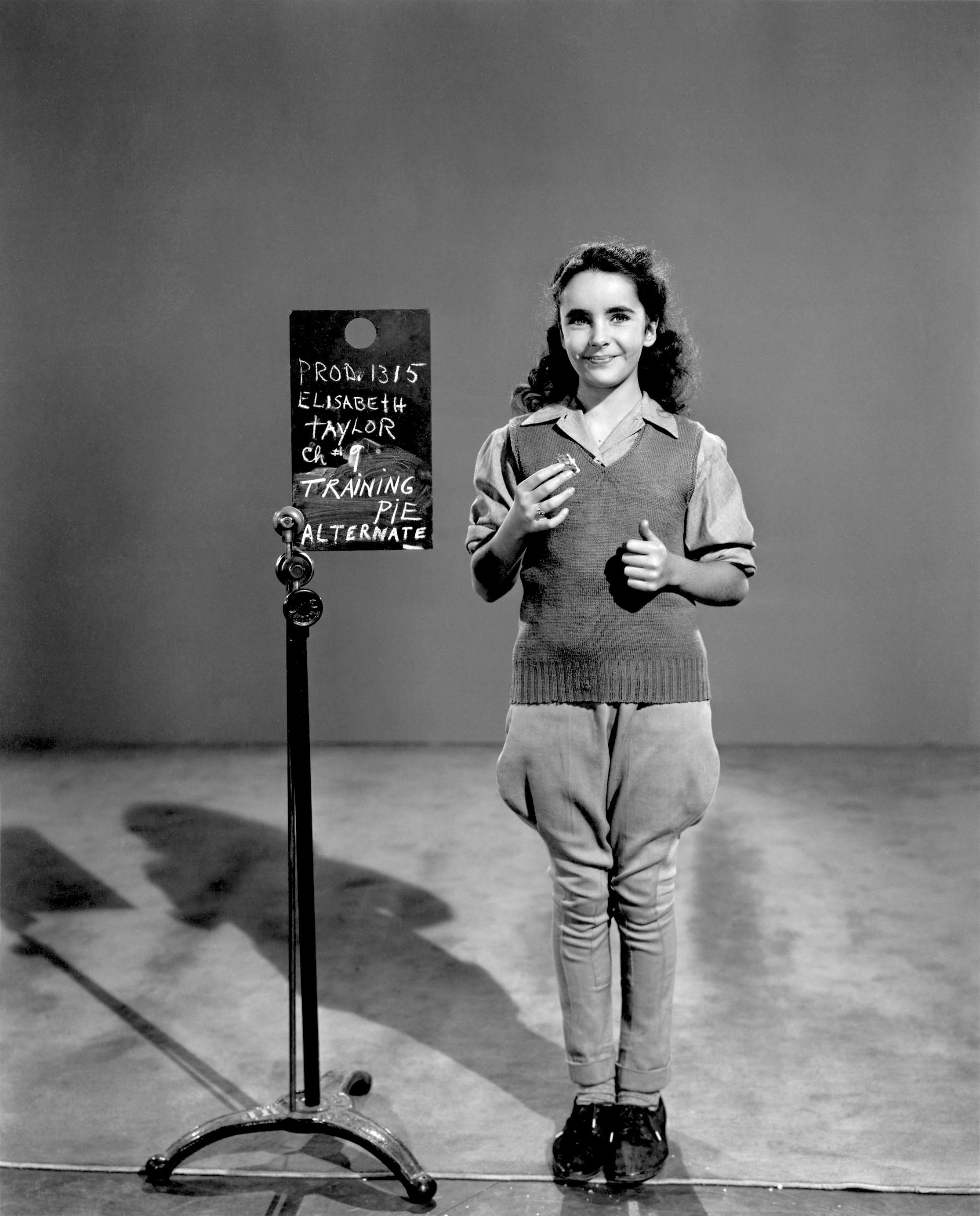
- Elizabeth Taylor in costume as Velvet Brown for the 1944 film National Velvet.
- Gender: Primarily female
- Language: English

Origin
- Meaning: velvet

Velvet is an English primarily feminine given name derived from the name for the fabric.

A young Elizabeth Taylor played the horse-crazy 12-year-old Velvet Brown in the 1944 film National Velvet based on the 1935 book by Enid Bagnold. An American television series based on the book and movie aired between 1960 and 1962.

== Usage ==
The name ranked among the top 1,000 names for newborn American girls between 1961 and 1964, coinciding with the air dates of the television series, but has not otherwise ranked among the most popular names in that country. It continues to remain in occasional use.

== Women ==
- Velvet Brown, American academic
- Velvet McIntyre (born 1962), Irish-Canadian retired professional wrestler

== Stage name ==
- Velvet, stage name of Swedish dance-pop singer Jenny Marielle Pettersson (born 1975)
- Velvet D'Amour (born 1967), American plus-size model and fashion photographer
- Red Velvet, ring name of Colombian-American professional wrestler Stephanie M. Cardona (born 1992)
- Velvet Rhodes, stage name of American actress, director and producer Patricia Adams (1949–2020)
- Velvet Sky, ring name of American retired professional wrestler and color commentator Jamie Lynn Szantyr (born 1981)

== Men ==
- Velvet James "Jim" or "Bad News” Barnes (1941–2002), American basketball player and Olympic gold medalist

== See also ==
- Velvet (dog), a heroic dog who helped save three climbers stranded on Oregon's Mount Hood in 2007
