= Lint remover =

Cleaning tool

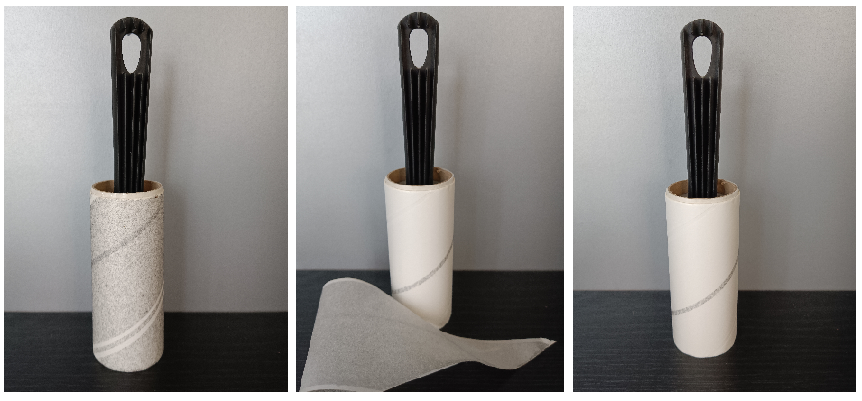
A lint remover in use

A lint remover is a device that facilitates the removal of lint or other small fibers from most materials such as clothing, upholstery and linen. The most ubiquitous type of lint remover is the lint roller, a roll of one-sided adhesive paper on a cardboard or plastic barrel that is mounted on a central spindle, with an attached handle. Other designs include lint brushes and electric fabric shavers.

== History ==
While traditional clothes brushes were used for removing lint and other debris from clothing since at least the 16th century in Europe, specialized cleaning tools for clothing that emphasized convenience, and often contained disposable elements, first appeared on the market in the mid-20th century in the United States. Early lint remover designs appeared on the market in the United States as early as 1948.

=== Early designs ===
The "Brushoff" was created by Robert W. Lehrfeld, Inc. of New York City. It was similar in shape and construction to a felt blackboard eraser but "impregnated with a rubbery substance". Testing by Consumer Reports found it a slight improvement over a "bristle brush" for removing lint. However, it had a tendency to pick up lint and deposit it elsewhere if not regularly cleaned.

Described by Consumer Reports as a mechanized "whisk broom," the Pixall Lint Remover, designed by Maywood Industries. Testing by Consumer Reports found the Pixall to be "a reasonable useful tool," with varying amounts of pressure needed depending on the type of fabric. The roller was orientated perpendicular to the handle like a paint roller. A five-foot roll of 3-inch-wide adhesive paper "emerges via a slot in the roller." This required fresh tape to be pulled through the slot after each use and refills were installed by taking apart the roller.

=== Helmac "Lint Pic-Up" ===
In 1956, Nicholas D. McKay, Sr., an electrical engineer, conceived of a new lint roller design while on his way to chaperone a school dance with his wife. He wrapped masking tape around a toilet paper tube and affixed it to a wire coat hanger to remove the lint from his tuxedo. Soon after, McKay formed the Helmac Products Corporation (named after his wife, Helen) and patented its sole product: the Lint Pic-Up. Operating at first out of the McKay's basement in Flint, Michigan, by 1968, the Lint Pic-Up was being distributed nationally. By 1973, it was being sold in more than 60,000 retail locations.

The product is popular among dog and cat owners, as it will also remove dog and cat hair from fabrics, carpets, etc.

== Other types ==
=== Reusable lint roller ===
Reusable lint rollers use elastomers, including silicones and polystyrene-ethylene-butylene-styrene as a reusable tacky surface.

=== Lint brush ===
A similar device, the lint brush uses a fabric cushion mounted to a handle, that when rubbed one way across the fabric to be cleaned, picks up the small fibers. By reversing the direction of movement across the fabric or by picking off the excess lint, it is possible to clean the lint brush. Some lint brushes are double sided in order to allow the brush to be used in both directions and to extend the use of the brush by limiting wear.

=== Fabric shaver ===
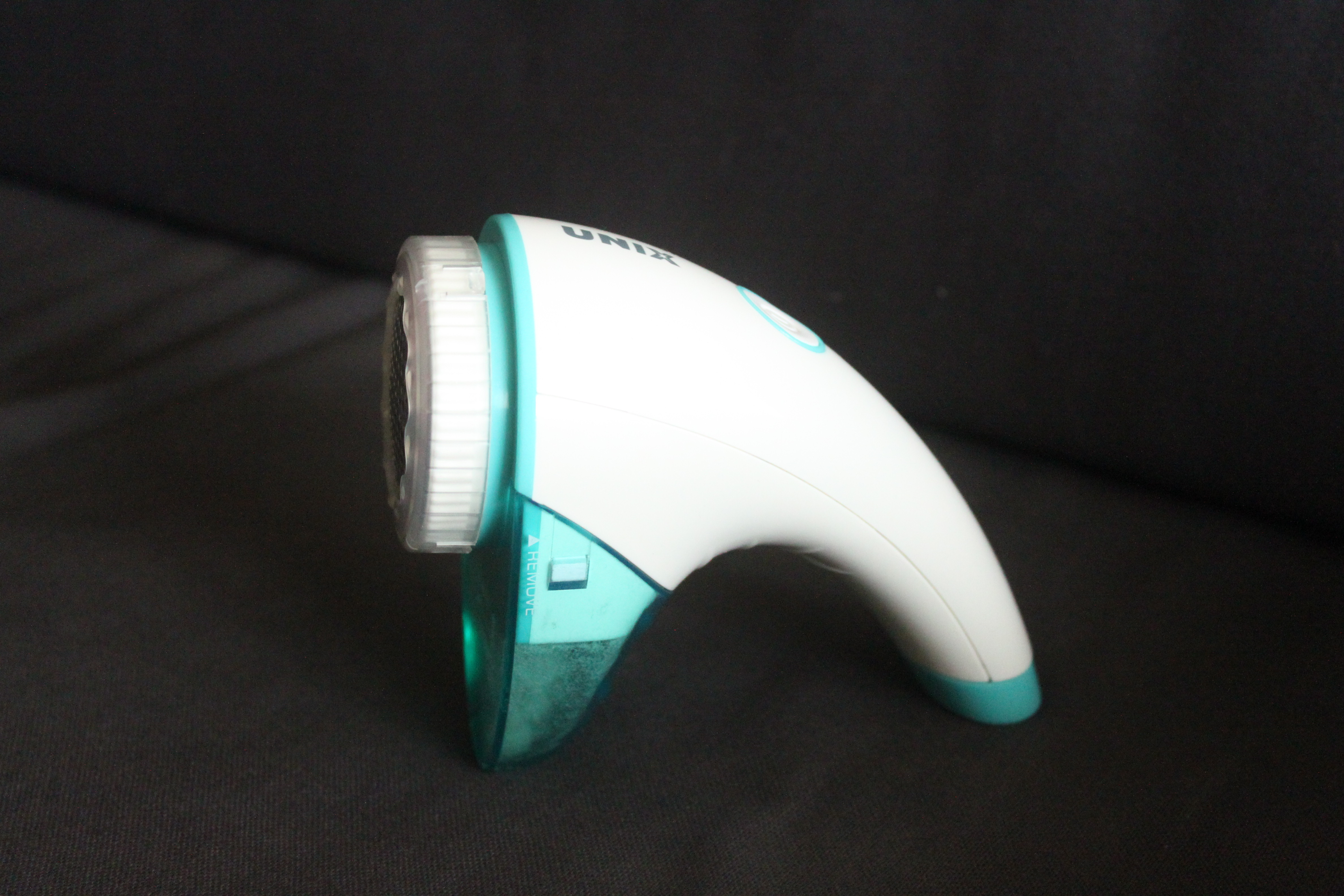
Unix Fabric Shaver

A fabric shaver (also known as a lint shaver or fuzz remover) is a handheld electrical device that has a rotating blade underneath a blade net. It allows users to remove fuzz and pills on a fabric without damaging the fabric. It can be applied on various fabric-made items such as bedding, curtains or carpets, but is mostly used for removing fuzz from clothing, especially sweaters, hoodies, or clothes made from wool, angora or cashmere. Fabric shavers are normally powered either by non-rechargeable dry cells, or with an internal rechargeable battery and an external charger.

== In popular culture ==
In the decades following their introduction, Helmac lint rollers were notably featured in Hollywood films, including The Accidental Tourist and Michael Moore's Roger & Me. Moore handed out free Helmac lint rollers on his 110-city promotional tour for the film.

The Best Friends Animal Society has hosted an annual "Lint Roller Party" fundraiser in Los Angeles featuring high-profile celebrities mingling with rescued animals.

In 2014, Drake was spotted using a lint roller while attending a Toronto Raptors basketball game. Soon after, the team and Drake announced a co-branded lint roller to capitalize on the media attention.

== See also ==
- Lint (material)
- List of cleaning tools
