= Pill (textile) =

Small ball of fibres adhering to the surface of a textile

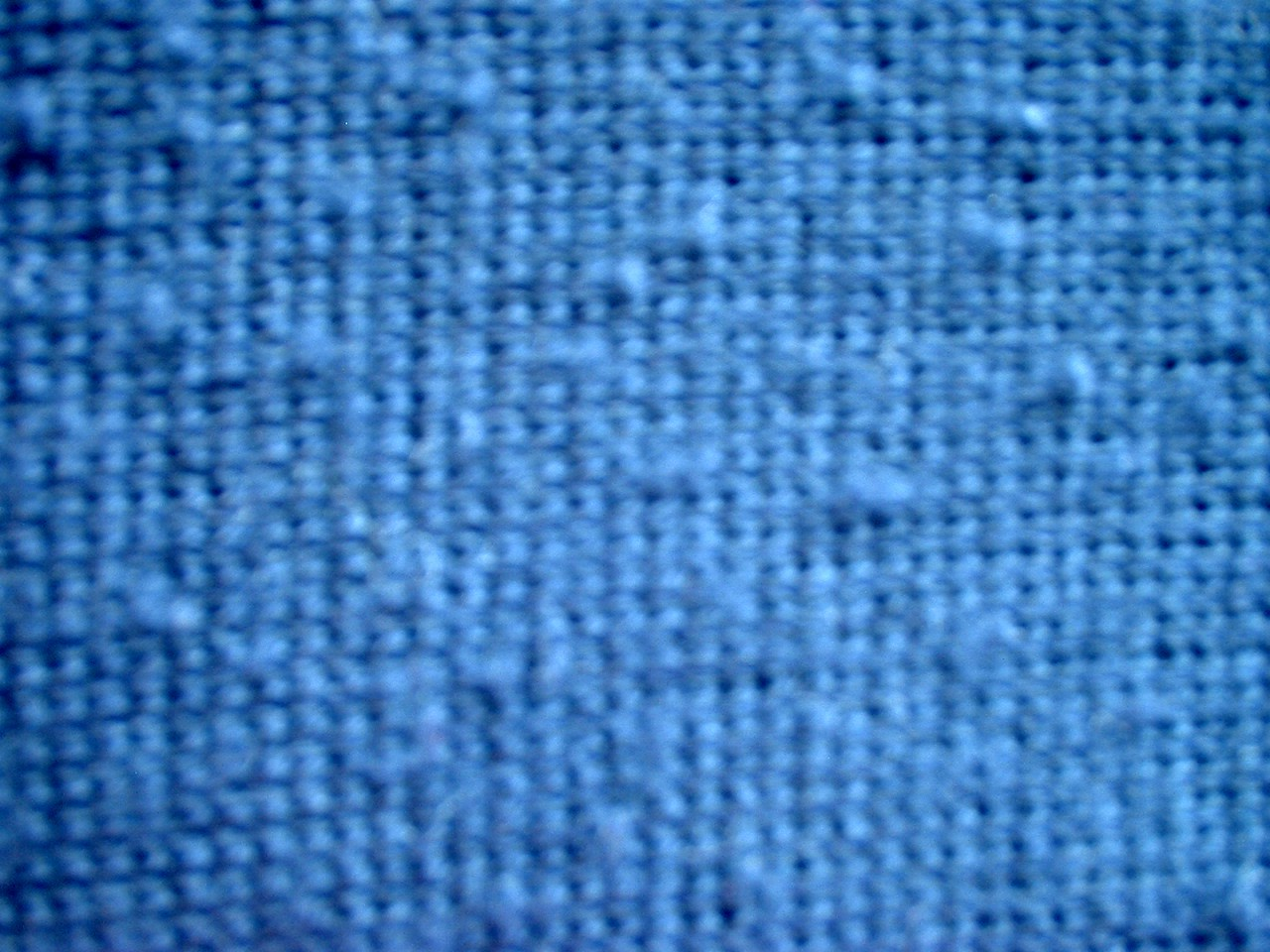
Pills on a knit fabric

A pill, colloquially known as a bobble, fuzzball, or lint ball, is a small ball of fibers that forms on a piece of cloth. Pill is also a verb for the formation of such balls.

Pilling is a surface defect of textiles caused by wear, and is generally considered an undesirable trait. It happens when washing and wearing of fabrics causes loose fibers to begin to push out from the surface of the cloth, and, over time, abrasion causes the fibers to develop into small spherical bundles, anchored to the surface of the fabric by protruding fibers that have not broken. The textile industry divides pilling into four stages: fuzz formation, entanglement, growth, and wear-off.

Pilling normally happens on the parts of clothing that receive the most abrasion in day-to-day wear, such as the collar, cuffs, and around the thighs and rear on trousers.

== Causes ==
All fabrics pill to some extent, although fibers such as linen and silk pill less than most. The primary drivers of pilling are the physical characteristics of the textile (including both the initial fiber, and the way in which it is processed during manufacturing), the personal habits of the textile's wearer, and the environment in which the textile is used. Fibers such as wool, cotton, polyester, nylon and acrylic have a tendency to pill the most, but wool pilling diminishes over time as non-tenacious wool fibers work themselves free of the fabric and break away, whereas pilling of synthetic textiles is a more serious problem, because the stronger fibers hold on to the pills preventing them from falling off.

In general, longer fibers pill less than short ones because there are fewer ends of fibers, and because it is harder for the longer fibers to work themselves out of the cloth. Fabrics with a large number of loose fibers have a higher tendency to pill. Also, knitted fabrics tend to pill more than woven fabrics, because of the greater distance between yarn crossings in knitted fabrics than in woven ones. For the same reason, a tightly knitted object will pill less than a loosely knitted one. When a fabric is made of a blend of fibers where one fiber is significantly stronger than the other, pills tend to form as the weaker fiber wears and breaks, and the stronger fiber holds the pills onto the cloth.

== Prevention ==
Techniques used by the textile industry to avoid pilling include singeing the loose fibers protruding on the surface of textile, and spinning the yarn with a high number of twists per inch. Some fabrics are chemically treated during the manufacturing process to reduce their propensity to pill. Polymeric coatings are sometimes applied to bind fibers into the fabric surface and prevent initial fuzz from forming. Polyester and cotton fibers are sometimes modified to be of lower-than-normal strength, which results in pills detaching easily from fabrics, once they are formed. Cellulase enzymes are sometimes used on cotton fabrics during wet processing, which removes loose fibers.

Textile authorities say consumers can prevent or postpone pilling of their fabrics by treating them with chemical soil release treatments that make the surface of the fabric more hydrophilic, and by turning clothes inside out before washing them.

== Result ==
Pills do not interfere with the functionality of the textile, unless a spot with a lot of pills turns into a hole in the fabric. This is because both pills and holes are caused by the fabric wearing—a pill is fiber that was in the cloth. After the pill forms the fabric is thinner there, increasing the likelihood that a hole will form.

Pilling can seriously compromise a textile's acceptability for consumers, and is the focus of significant industry research. In the textile industry, severity of pilling is objectively evaluated using five parameters: pill number, the mean area of pilling; the total area of pilling; contrast, and density.

Pills can be removed by shaving the fabric.

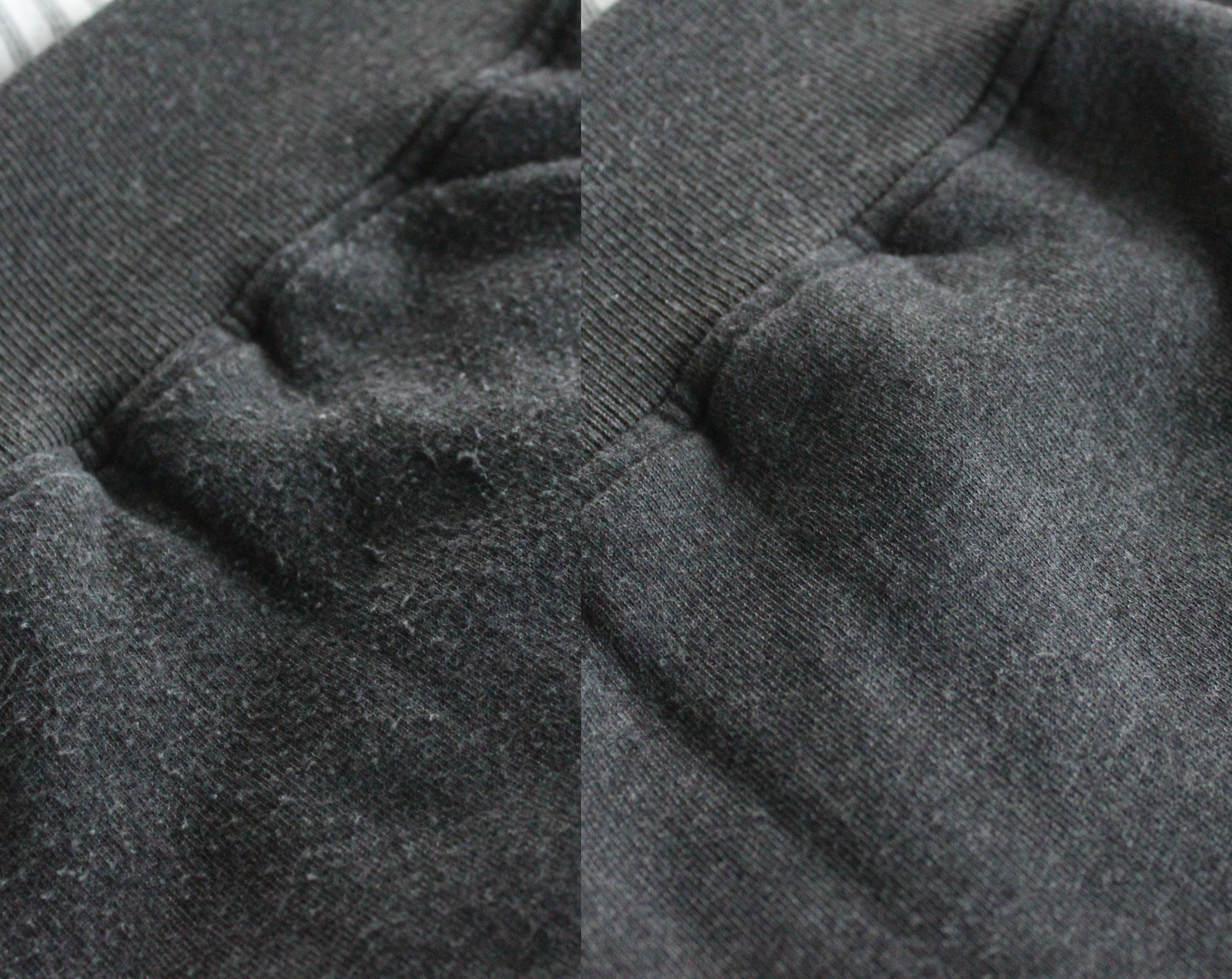
Before and after shaving

== See also ==
- Nap (textile)
- Pile (textile)
