= Bradshaw International =

American manufacturer of food service equipment

- Industry: Food service equipment
- Founded: 1969; 57 years ago
- Headquarters: 9409 Buffalo Ave, 91730, Rancho Cucamonga, California, United States
- Area served: International
- Website: bradshawhome.com

Bradshaw International is an American manufacturer of food service equipment, headquartered in Rancho Cucamonga, California. The company owns the brand goodcook and has a partnership with Mr. Clean.

== History ==
The company was founded in 1969 by Buzz Bradshaw and his two sons, Doug and Ben.

In 2004, the brand "captured 43% of the nationwide market for kitchen ware sold at supermarkets and drug stores - inventory for all of which will pass through the headquarters complex when the operation is at 100 percent by the end of March". The brand is sold at "Albertsons, Food 4 Less, Gelsons, Harman's, Kitchen Collection, Raley's, Safeway, Sav-on Drug, Stater Brothers and Vons".

In 2005, the company introduced "new can opener called the goodcook Orbi Safecut Can Opener".

In February 2011, Top Chef star, Fabio Viviani, formed a partnership with the company's moka division, Bialetti. Bradshaw hoped Viviani would bring "appeal to their newest products [that] year.

In 2012, Arbor Investments sold Bradshaw International to ONCAP.

In January 2014, Butler Home Products, a division of Bradshaw International, acquired specific cleaning and garment care businesses from The oneCARE Company.

In June 2016, Butler Home Products, a division of Bradshaw International, acquired Clean Ones Corp.

In 2018, the company released "GoodCook Meal Prep Containers".

In March 2021, Bradshaw Home acquired a company named Architec Housewares.

In October 2021, ONCAP has completed the sale Bradshaw Home to Arbor Investments.
