= Lint (material) =

Accumulation of clothing hair, etc.

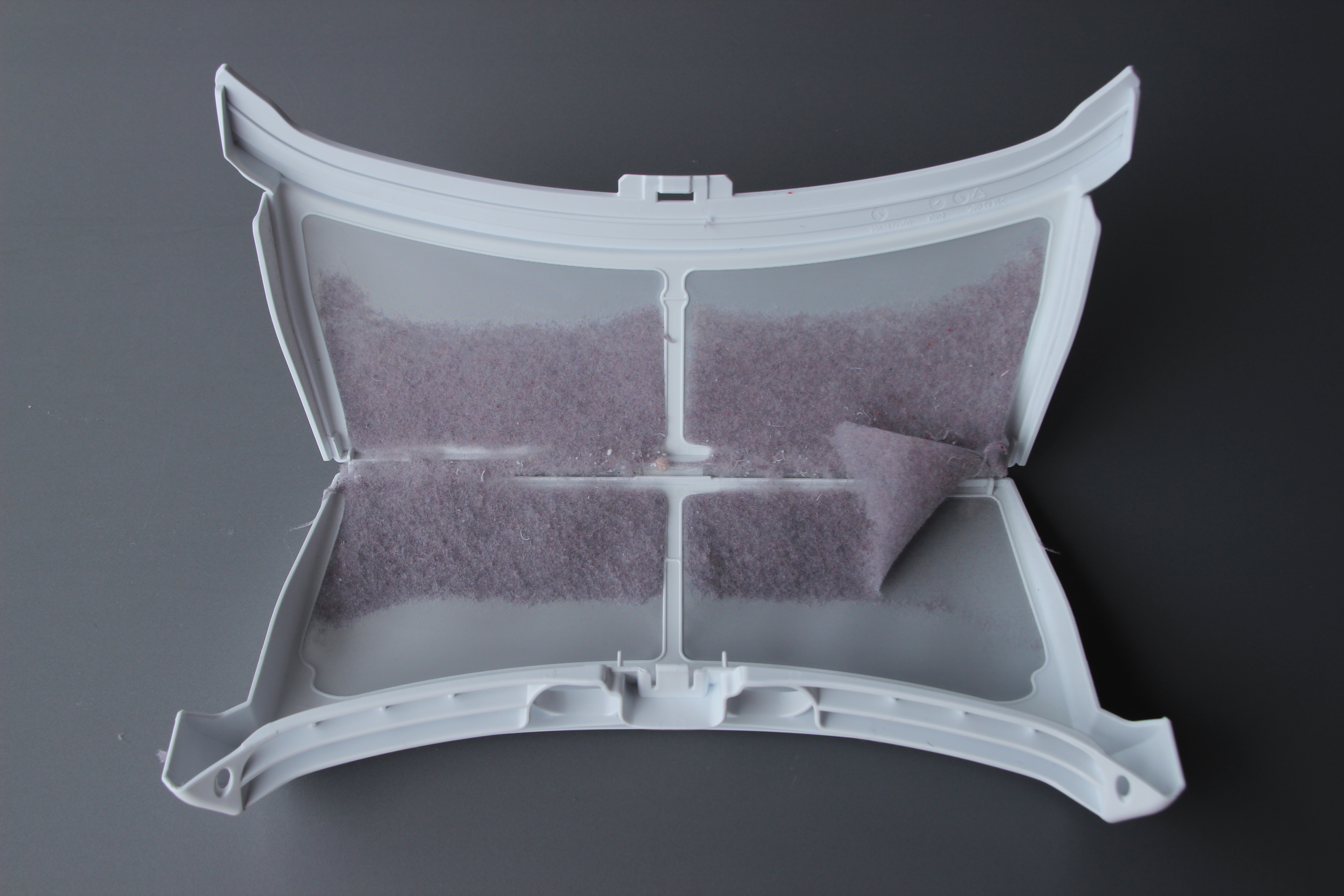
- Lint accumulation in the screen of a clothes dryer
- Material type: Visible hair, and many textile fibers and other materials

Lint is the common name for visible accumulations of textile fibers, hair and other materials, usually found on and around clothing. Certain materials used in the manufacture of clothing, such as cotton, linen, and wool, contain numerous, very short fibers bundled together. During the course of normal wear, these fibers may either detach or be jostled out of the weave of which they are part. This is the reason why heavily used articles, such as shirts and towels, become thin over time and why such particles accumulate in the lint screen of a clothes dryer.

Because of their high surface area to weight ratio, static cling causes fibers that have detached from an article of clothing to continue to stick to one another and to that article or other surfaces with which they come in contact. Other small fibers or particles also accumulate with these clothing fibers, including human and animal hair and skin cells, plant fibers, and pollen, dust, and microorganisms.

== Etymology ==
The etymology of the modern word "lint" is related to "linting", the term used for the cultivation of the shorter fibers from the cotton plant (Gossypium), also referred to as "lint", from which lower-quality cotton products are manufactured. Lint is composed of threads of all colors, which blend hues and may appear to be a uniform grey.

== Varieties of lint ==
=== Boracic lint ===
Boracic lint (/bɒˈræsɪk/) is a type of medical dressing made from surgical lint that is soaked in a hot, saturated solution of boracic acid and glycerine and then left to dry. It has been in use since at least the 19th century, but is now less commonly used. When in use, boracic lint proved to be very valuable in the treatment of leg ulcers.

=== Cotton lint ===
Cotton lint, or cotton linters, is a byproduct of the process of ginning cotton, consisting of the silky fibres that remain attached to the seeds of the cotton plant, as well as other more coarse fibres. This material may be purified and used for such purposes as the manufacture of paper.

=== Dryer lint ===
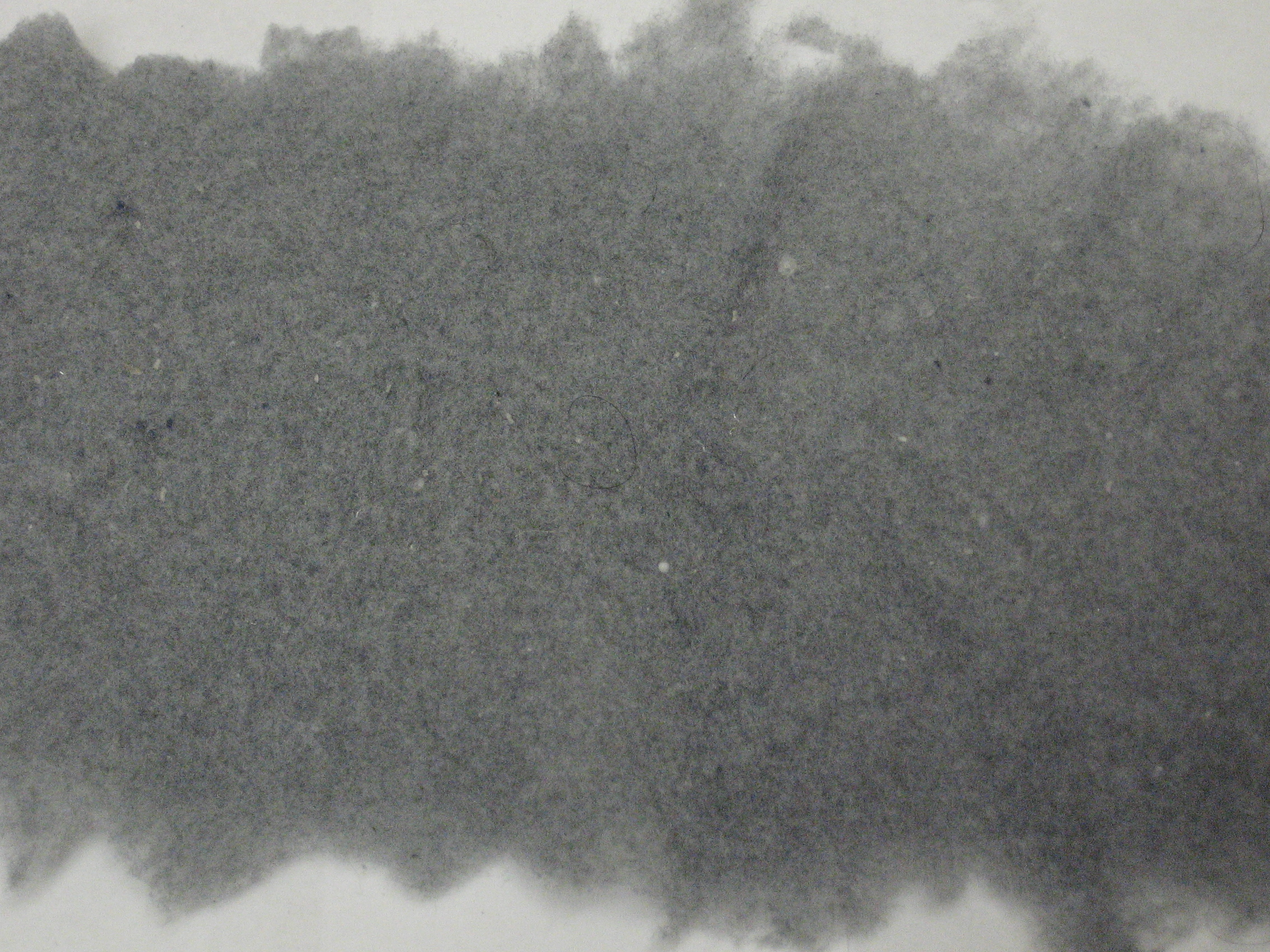
Close-up of dryer lint

Dryer lint is lint generated by the drying of clothes in a clothes dryer; it typically accumulates on a dryer screen. Underwriters Laboratories recommends cleaning the lint filter after every cycle for safety and energy efficiency. Failure to clean the lint filter is the leading cause of home clothes dryer fires.

=== Navel lint ===
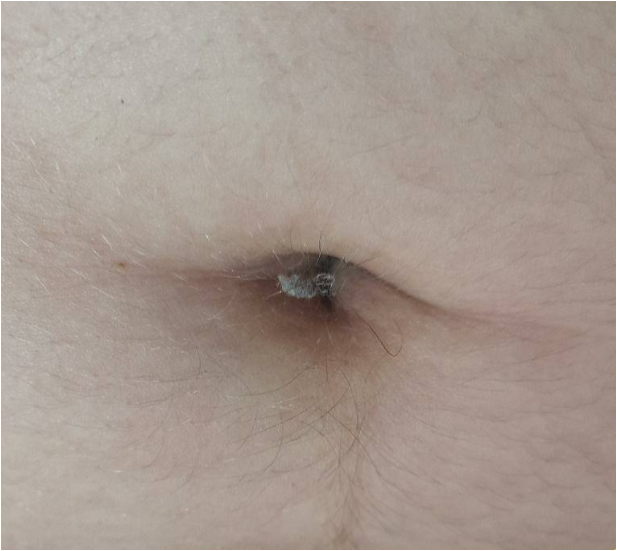
Navel lint

Navel lint (also known by names such as navel fluff, belly button lint, belly button fluff, and dip lint) is an accumulation of fluffy fibers in the navel cavity often found at the beginning and end of the day. Cloth fibers are scraped by body hair via friction, which ratchets the fibers in the direction of hair growth.

=== Pocket lint ===
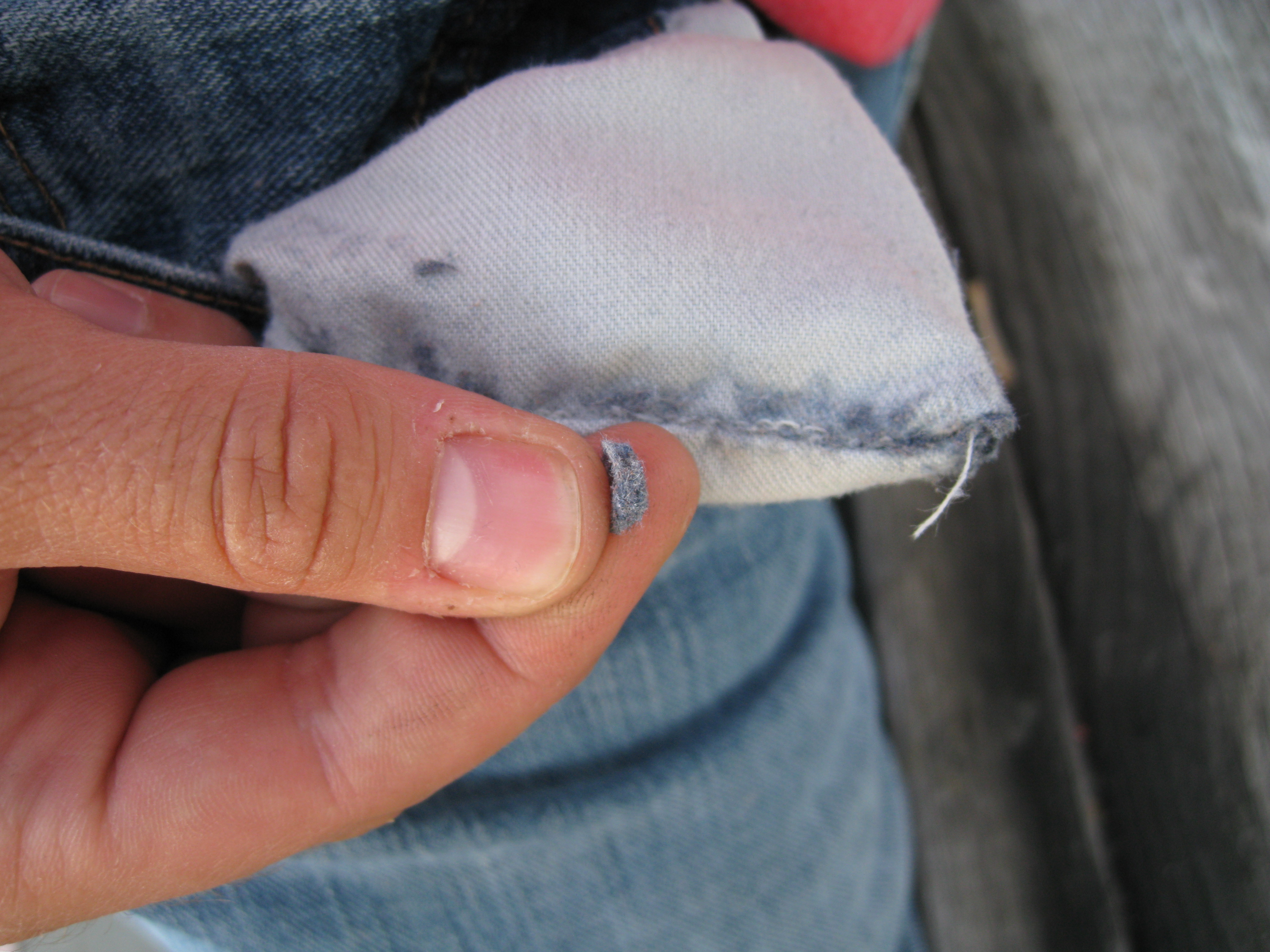
Pocket lint

Pocket lint (also known as gnurr) is debris including bits of fabric as well as small shreds of paper and tissue that are often found in pockets. It may sometimes be caused by running the clothing through a washing machine one or more times, causing the pocket lining or contents to compact and shred.

As pocket lint is an amalgamation of the contents of the pockets, pocket lint can be helpful when determining whether drugs have been previously stored in the pockets, by testing it with various drug tests. In a survival situation, pocket lint can be used as tinder for starting a fire.

The Infocom game The Hitchhiker's Guide to the Galaxy was sold with a collection of "props" that included a small bag of "pocket fluff".

== Problems related to lint ==
=== Biological problems ===
Inhalation of excessive amounts of lint, as observed in early textile workers, may lead to diseases of the lungs, such as byssinosis. Lint shed from clothing during the course of wear may also carry bacteria and viruses. For this reason, the presence of lint presents a danger during surgery, when it might carry microorganisms into open wounds. It has been demonstrated that due to the abrasive contact between clothing and skin, "a person wearing a standard cotton scrub suit actually sheds more bacteria than without clothing". Lint is also a component of "toe jam", described as "that gunk located between your toes", which can result due to not properly cleaning feet and toes. Like ear wax, mucus, and many other bodily residues (...). But the issue can have several different causes—some of them more serious than others — so it pays to give your feet special attention." Lint also presents a threat to the environment in spaces that generally do not experience human contact, constituting "one of the primary polluters" in cave exploration.

=== Mechanical problems ===
Lint contamination also presents what may be the most serious threat of damage to delicate mechanical devices. In order to prevent lint contamination, workers entering clean rooms are generally required to wear an outer layer of clothing made from artificial fibers that are longer and thicker, and therefore much less likely to shed any material. Lint-resistant clothing materials include, elastic fabrics like spandex (or Lycra), for which the fibers will tend to stretch rather than break, and longer, stronger non-woven polyolefin fibers.

=== Other problems ===
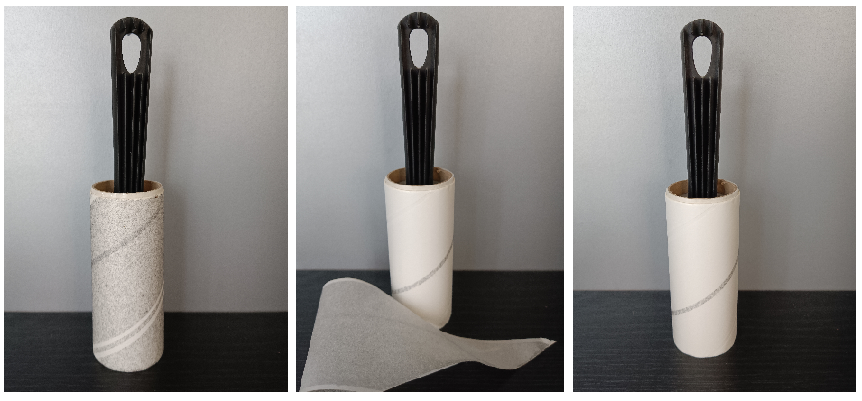
A lint remover used for removing visible lint from fabrics

Lint on clothing is generally considered unattractive and unprofessional. Furthermore, lint may be abrasive and may damage the clothing itself. For these reasons, visible lint is often removed with a lint remover or clothes brush. The accumulation of lint during clothes cleaning can be reduced with the use of a fabric softener, which reduces the amount of static electricity on clothing surfaces and therefore prevents the lint from sticking to the clothes.

Dryer lint, which collects on the lint screen of a clothes dryer, is highly flammable and therefore presents a fire hazard. However, because of this flammability, dryer lint may be collected for use as tinder, although burning human-made fibres can produce toxic fumes.

== Uses of lint ==
=== Composting ===
It is possible to compost lint retrieved from the lint screen on a dryer by adding it to other materials being composted. The texture of the material allows the organic matter within it to compost quickly and easily. However, depending on the source, it may include inorganic fibers and materials which never break down.

=== Forensic science ===
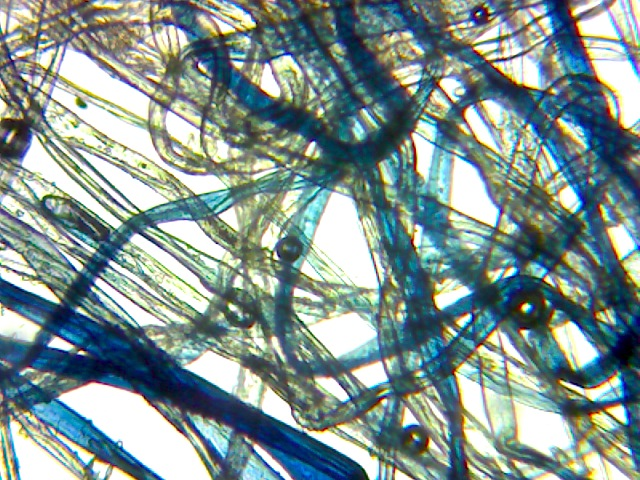
Denim fibers like these may collect on someone's clothing and be analyzed by forensic scientists

Lint is useful to examine in forensic science because it is accumulated over time, and because the fibers shed from clothing adhere to not only that clothing, but also other particles to which the carrier is exposed. The lint on a person's clothing is therefore likely to contain material transferred from the various environments through which that person has passed, enabling forensic examiners to collect and examine lint to determine the movements and activities of the wearer. Examiners may use various chemicals to isolate lint fibers from different articles of clothing based on differences in color and other characteristics.

=== Tinder ===
Dryer lint burns readily. Although this may present a hazard in the household, it also means that lint makes excellent tinder for starting fires. It is especially useful for catching sparks from flint and steel, or similar striker-type fire starters in the absence of matches.

=== Wound treatment ===
Lint was used as a form of wound treatment for cuts and sores as early as 1500 BC and as recently as the American Civil War. Lint used specifically for treating wounds was sometimes referred to as charpie.

== See also ==
- Dandruff
- Lint remover

== External links and further reading ==
- Barker, Graham. "World record navel lint collection". feargod.net. Archived from the original on 2004-10-09.
- "Bellybutton Lint Collecters". craftbits.com. 10 September 2007.
- Kruszelnicki, Karl (2001). "The Great Bellybutton Lint Survey". Australian Broadcasting Corporation. Q & A with Dr K.
