= Solin (disambiguation) =

Solin may refer to:

== Places ==
- Solin, Croatia, a town in Dalmatia
- Solin (river), a tributary of Loing river in Loiret, France

== People ==
- Egil Solin Ranheim (1923-1992), a Norwegian politician for the Labour Party
- Ilmari Solin (1905-1976), Finnish chess player
- Tim Solin (born 1958), American curler, 1998 Winter Olympics participant
- Tony Solin, a former Australian rules footballer and political aspirant

== Other ==
- Solin (crop), a mutant strain of flax
- Solin salmon, is an endemic trout subspecies found in Croatia.
