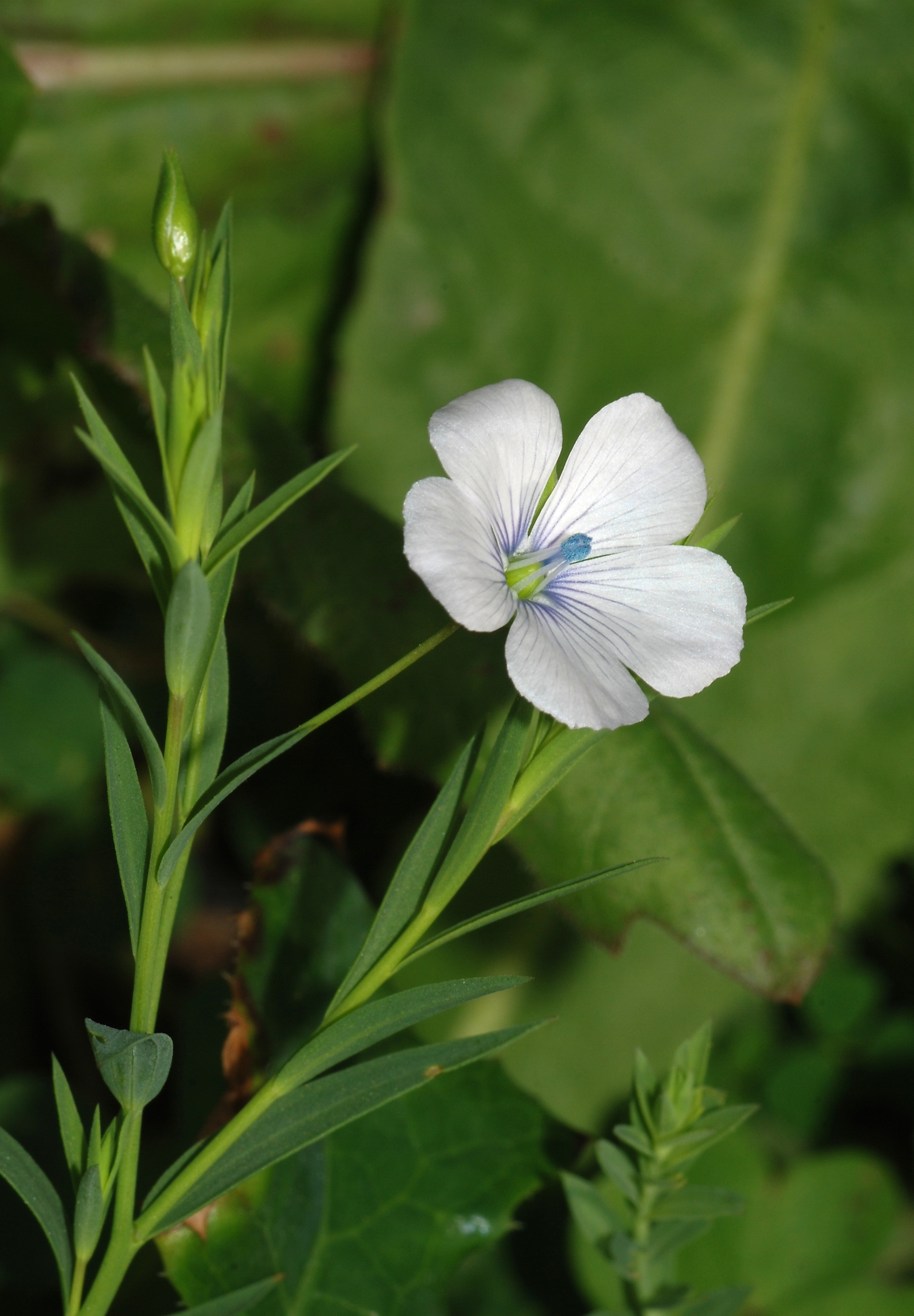

Scientific classification
- Kingdom: Plantae
- Clade: Tracheophytes
- Clade: Angiosperms
- Clade: Eudicots
- Clade: Rosids
- Order: Malpighiales
- Family: Linaceae
- Genus: Linum
- Species: L. bienne

Binomial name
- Linum bienne Mill.

Synonyms
- Adenolinum angustifolium (Huds.) Rchb.; Cathartolinum agreste Rchb.; Linum angustifolium Huds.

= Linum bienne =

Pale flax

Species of flowering plant

Linum bienne, the pale or narrowleaf flax, is a flowering plant in the genus Linum, native to the Mediterranean region and western Europe, north to England and Ireland.

Pale flax grows as a biennial or perennial plant in dry, sunny calcareous or neutral grasslands from sea level up to 1000 m. It has long, narrow stems to 60 cm tall and slender leaves 1.5–2.5 cm long. The flowers have five petals about 1 cm long and nearly round; they are pale blue but streaked with darker colour. It flowers in late spring and, at least in more temperate regions, through the summer. The flowers are hermaphroditic and are predominantly self-fertilising.

Linum bienne (=L. angustifolium) is considered the probable wild forebear of the cultivated flax, and a fibre can be made from its stem. It is sometimes grown as a garden plant.

It is an introduced species in Chile. Also, it has been introduced into North America, where it is naturalized on the Pacific coast from Oregon to the central coast of California, and also in Pennsylvania; it is found in Hawaii, as well.
