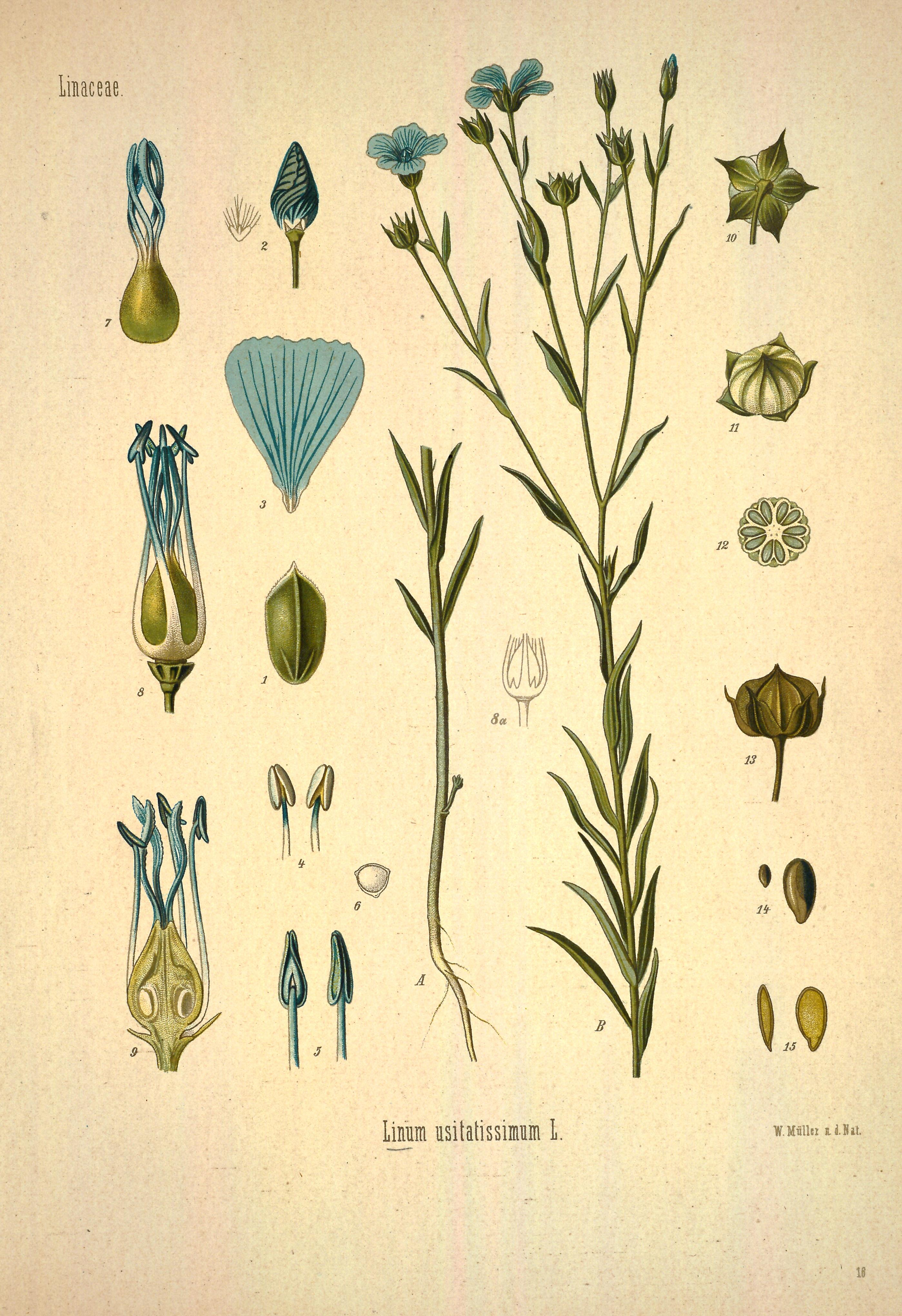
- Botanical illustration from 1887

Scientific classification
- Kingdom: Plantae
- Clade: Tracheophytes
- Clade: Angiosperms
- Clade: Eudicots
- Clade: Rosids
- Order: Malpighiales
- Family: Linaceae
- Genus: Linum
- Species: L. usitatissimum

Binomial name
- Linum usitatissimum L.

Varieties
- L. usitatissimum var. stenophyllum (Boiss.) Rech.f.; L. usitatissimum var. usitatissimum

Synonyms
- Linum crepitans (Boenn.) Dumort.; Linum humile Mill.; Linum indehiscens (Neilr.) Vavilov & Elladi

= Flax =

Species of flowering plant

Flax, also known as common flax or line, is a flowering plant, Linum usitatissimum, in the family Linaceae. It is cultivated as a food and fiber crop in regions of the world with temperate climates.

Textiles made from flax are known in English as linen and are traditionally used for bed sheets, underclothes, and table linen. Its seeds are known as flaxseed or linseed and its oil is known as linseed oil. In addition to referring to the plant, the word "flax" may refer to the unspun fibers of the flax plant.

The plant species is known only as a cultivated plant and appears to have been domesticated just once from the wild species Linum bienne, called pale flax. The plants called "flax" in New Zealand are, by contrast, members of the genus Phormium.

== Names and etymology ==
The term 'flax' can refer to both the plant and the fibres of it, and is derived from Old English: fleax, from Proto-Germanic: *flahso. It is cognate with terms in other West Germanic languages, including Old Frisian: flax, Dutch: vlas and German: flachs. From it are derived terms such as 'flaxseed' ('seed of the flax plant') and 'flaxen' ('made from flax', 'the colour of flax flowers', 'the colour of woven flax: especially in reference to hair'.

An alternative name is 'line' from Old English: lín, which is cognate with words in other Germanic languages such as Old Norse: lín, and its modern derivative Swedish: lin, along with Gothic: lein and Dutch: lijn. While this name for the plant is less common than 'flax', it is often used in the derived 'linen' ('cloth woven from flax') and the compound noun 'linseed' ('seeds of the flax plant').

== Description ==
Several other species in the genus Linum are similar in appearance to L. usitatissimum, cultivated flax, including some that have similar blue flowers, and others with white, yellow, or red flowers. Some of these are perennial plants, unlike L. usitatissimum, which is an annual plant.

Cultivated flax plants grow to 1.2 m (4 ft) tall, with slender stems. The leaves are glaucous green, slender lanceolate, 2–4 cm (3/4–1 1/2 in) long, and 3 mm broad.

The flowers are 15–25 mm in diameter with five petals, which can be coloured white, blue, yellow, and red depending on the species. The fruit is a round, dry capsule 5–9 mm in diameter, containing several glossy brown seeds shaped like apple pips, 4–7 mm long.

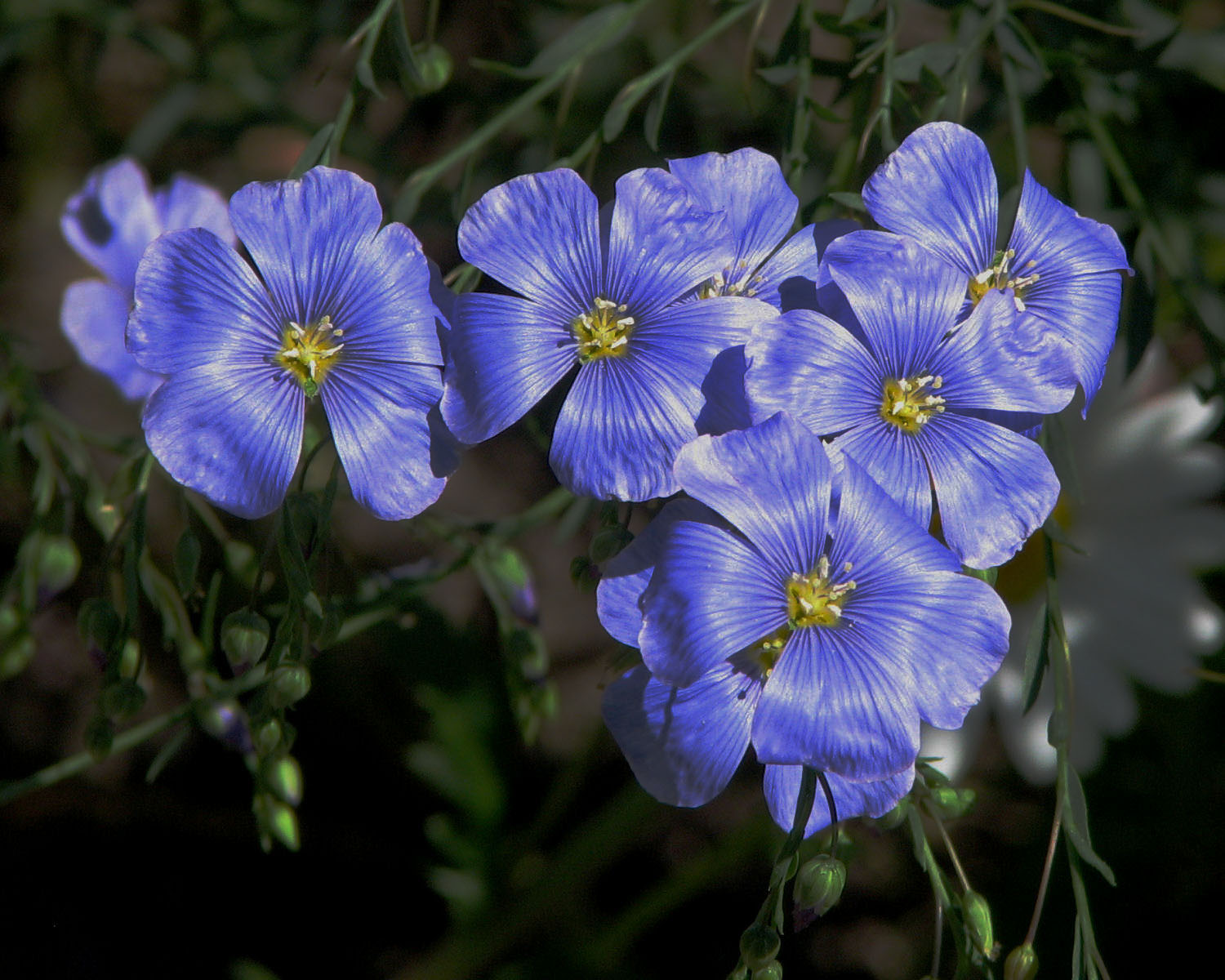
Flowers

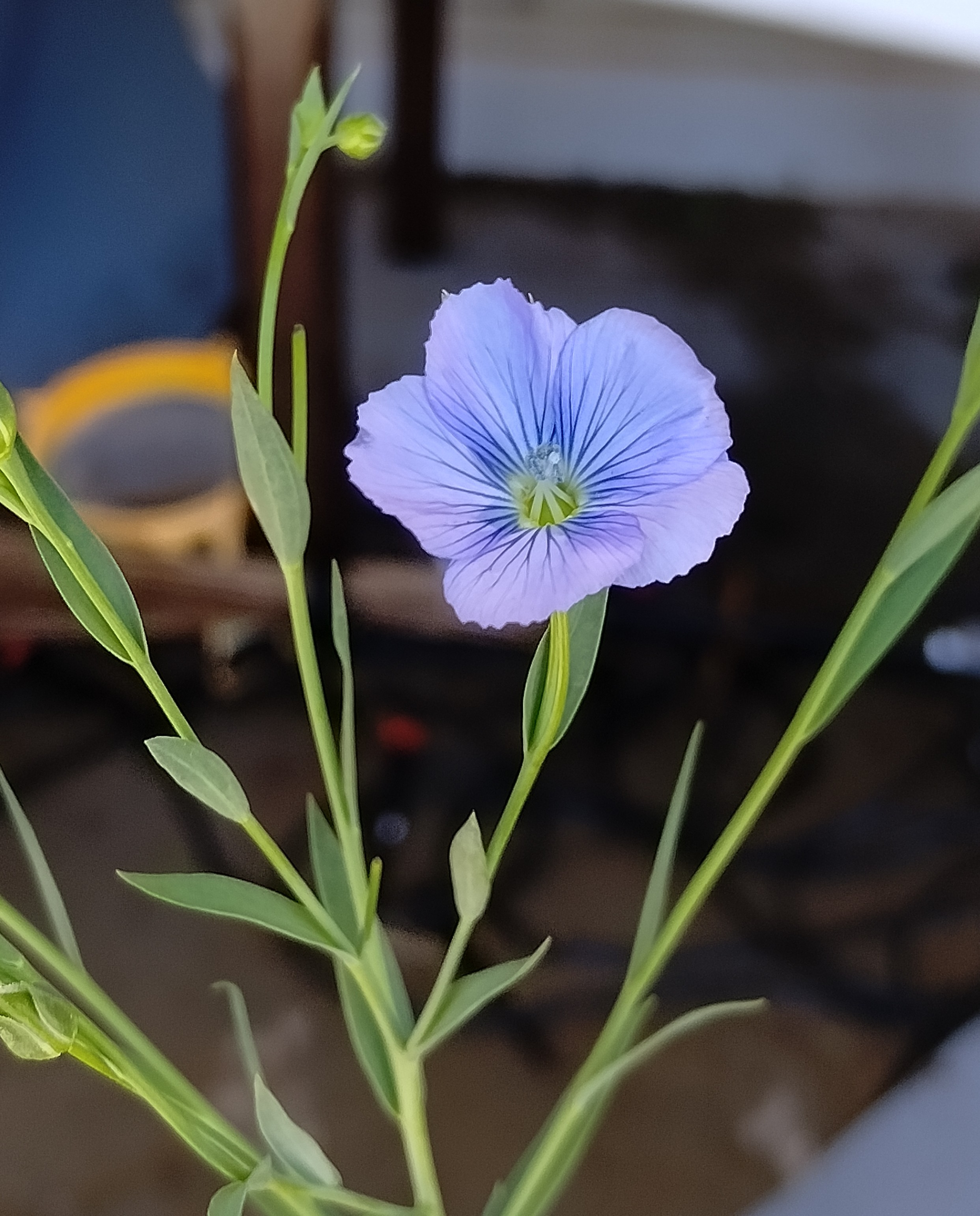
Light-coloured flower

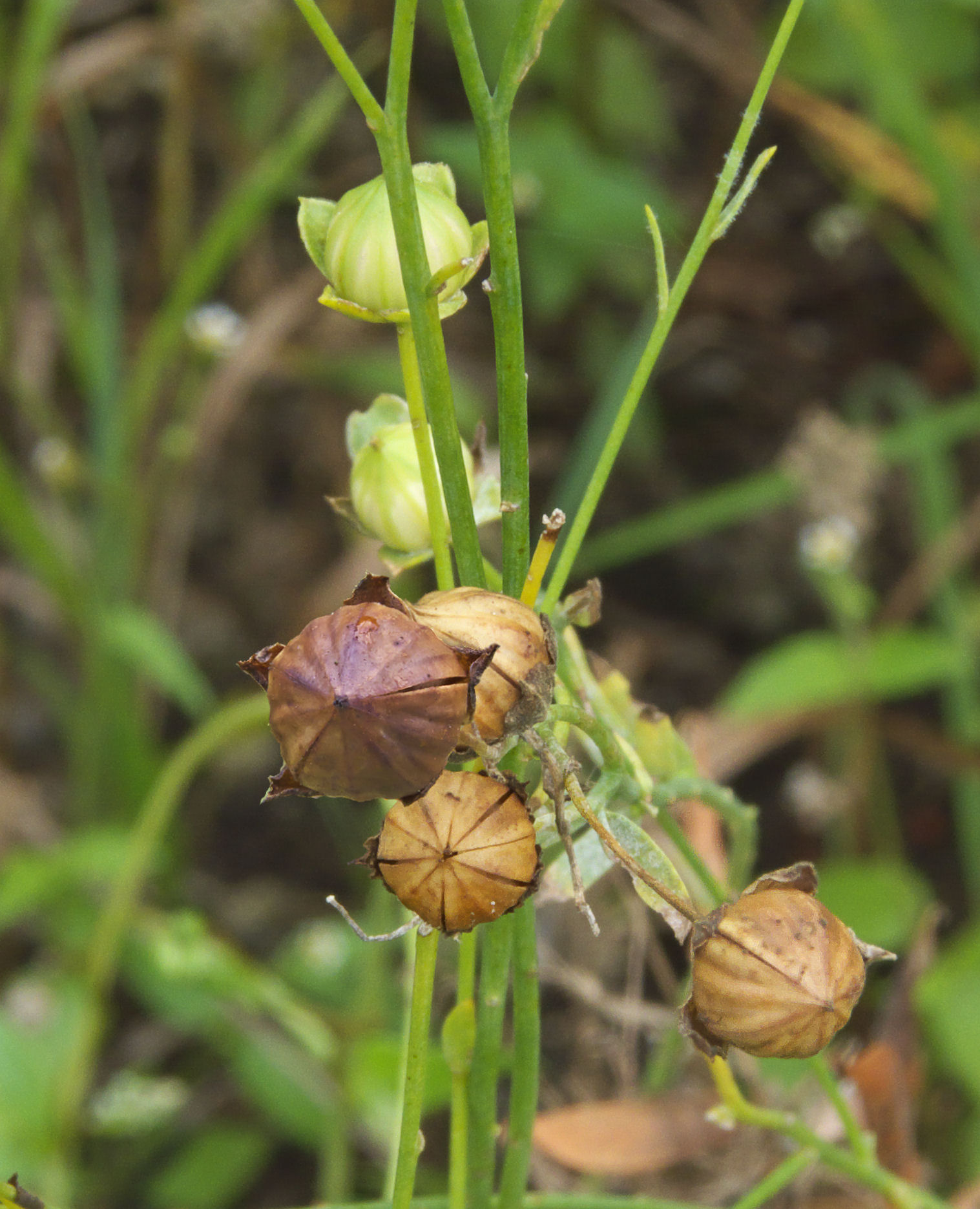
Capsules

== Taxonomy ==
The scientific name for flax was coined by Carl Linnaeus in his book Species Plantarum in 1753.

=== Varieties ===
According to Plants of the World Online the flax species has two botanical varieties, Linum usitatissimum var. usitatissimum and Linum usitatissimum var. stenophyllum.

== Cultivation ==
Flax is native to the region extending from the eastern Mediterranean to India and was first domesticated in the Fertile Crescent. The soils most suitable for flax, besides the alluvial kind, are deep loams containing a large proportion of organic matter. Flax is often found growing just above the waterline in cranberry bogs. Heavy clays are unsuitable, as are soils of a gravelly or dry sandy nature. Farming flax requires few fertilizers or pesticides. The plant can reach a height of around 3 feet.

=== History ===
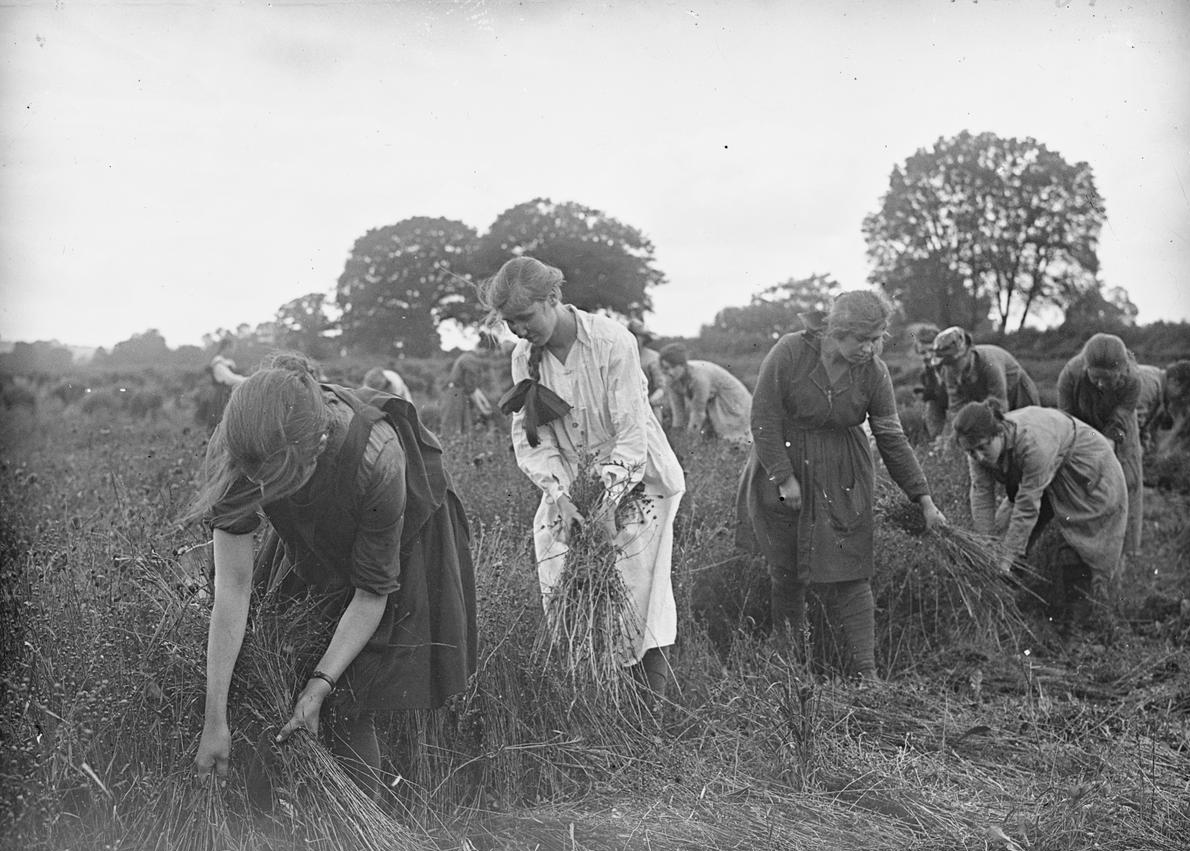
Flax being harvested by the Women's Land Army in Britain, during World War I

The earliest evidence of humans using wild flax as a textile comes from the present-day Republic of Georgia, where spun, dyed, and knotted wild flax fibers found in Dzudzuana Cave date to the Upper Paleolithic, 30,000 years ago. Humans first domesticated flax in the Fertile Crescent region. Evidence exists of a domesticated oilseed flax with increased seed-size from Tell Ramad in Syria and flax fabric fragments from Çatalhöyük in Turkey by c. 9,000 years ago. Use of the crop steadily spread, reaching as far as Switzerland and Germany by 5,000 years ago. In China and India, domesticated flax was cultivated at least 5,000 years ago.

Flax was cultivated extensively in ancient Egypt, where the temple walls had paintings of flowering flax, and mummies were embalmed using linen. Egyptian priests wore only linen, as flax symbolized purity. Phoenicians traded Egyptian linen throughout the Mediterranean and the Romans used it for their sails. As the Roman Empire declined, so did flax production. But with laws designed to publicize the hygiene of linen textiles and the health of linseed oil, Charlemagne revived the crop in the eighth century CE. Eventually, Flanders became the major center of the European linen industry in the Middle Ages. In North America, colonists introduced flax, and it flourished there, but by the early 20th century, cheap cotton and rising farm wages had caused production of flax to become concentrated in northern Russia, which came to provide 90% of the world's output. Since then, flax has lost its importance as a commercial crop, due to the easy availability of more inexpensive synthetic fibres.

=== Production ===
Flax production – 2022 (tonnes)
France	652,680
Belgium	77,910
Belarus	47,626
China	29,035
Russia	24,103
World	875,995
Source: FAOSTAT of the United Nations

In 2022, world production of raw or retted flax was 875,995 tonnes, led by France with 75% of the total. One of the largest regions in France for flax production is Normandy with nearly one-third of the world's production.

Production of raw or retted flax

Flax raw or retted yield

Production of linseed

Linseed yield

=== Harvesting ===
==== Maturation ====
Flax is harvested for fiber production about a month after the plants flower (roughly 90 to 120 days after sowing), when the seed capsules begin to turn from green to pale brown. When the flax is ready to pull, the lower stems will have turned pale yellow and the leaves will have fallen from them; if pulled too early, the fiber will be tender and underdeveloped, while flax left until fully ripe makes dry, coarse fiber.

Flax grown for seed is allowed to mature until the seed capsules are yellow and just starting to split; it is then harvested in various ways. A combine harvester may either cut only the heads of the plants, or the whole plant. These are then dried to extract the seed. The amount of weeds in the straw affects its marketability, and this, coupled with market prices, determines whether the farmer chooses to harvest the flax straw. If the flax straw is not harvested, typically, it is burned, since the stalks are quite tough and decompose slowly (i.e., not in a single season). Formed into windrows from the harvesting process, the straw often clogs up tillage and planting equipment. Flax straw of insufficient quality for fiber use can be baled to build shelters for farm animals, sold as biofuel, or removed from the field in the spring.

Two ways are used to harvest flax fiber, one involving mechanized equipment (combines), and the second method, is more manual and targets maximum fiber length.

==== Harvesting for fiber ====
===== Mechanical =====
Flax for fiber production is usually harvested by a specialized flax harvester fitted with a flax puller instead of a cutting head. The puller grips the stems between belts and pulls the whole plant out of the ground with the roots; since the entire stalk is lifted, the fiber-bearing part is not lost with the stubble as it is when the crop is mowed. The pulled plants are laid down on the field in a ribbon and left for field retting. The mature plant can also be cut with mowing equipment, similar to hay harvesting, and raked into windrows. When dried sufficiently, a combine then harvests the seeds similar to wheat or oat harvesting.

===== Manual =====
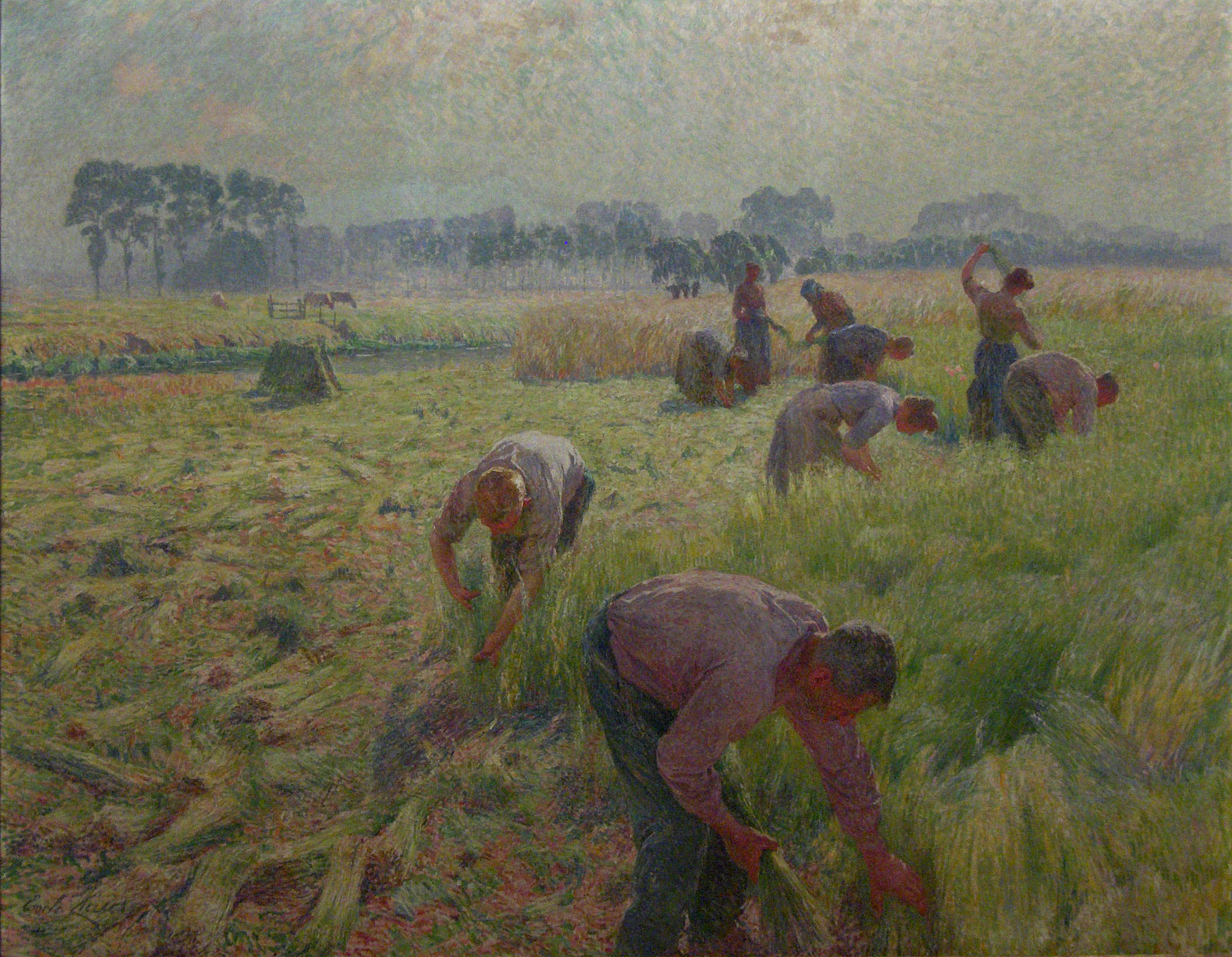
De vlasoogst (1904) ("The flax harvest") painting by Emile Claus, Royal Museums of Fine Arts of Belgium, Brussels, Belgium

The plant is pulled up with the roots (not cut), so as to maintain the maximum fiber length. After this, the flax is allowed to dry, the seed capsules are removed, and the straw is retted, where an enzymatic action (dew retting), or microbial digestion (water retting), degrades the pectins that bind fibers to the straw. Retted flax straw is cleaned and dried, and stored until fibre extraction.

=== Processing ===
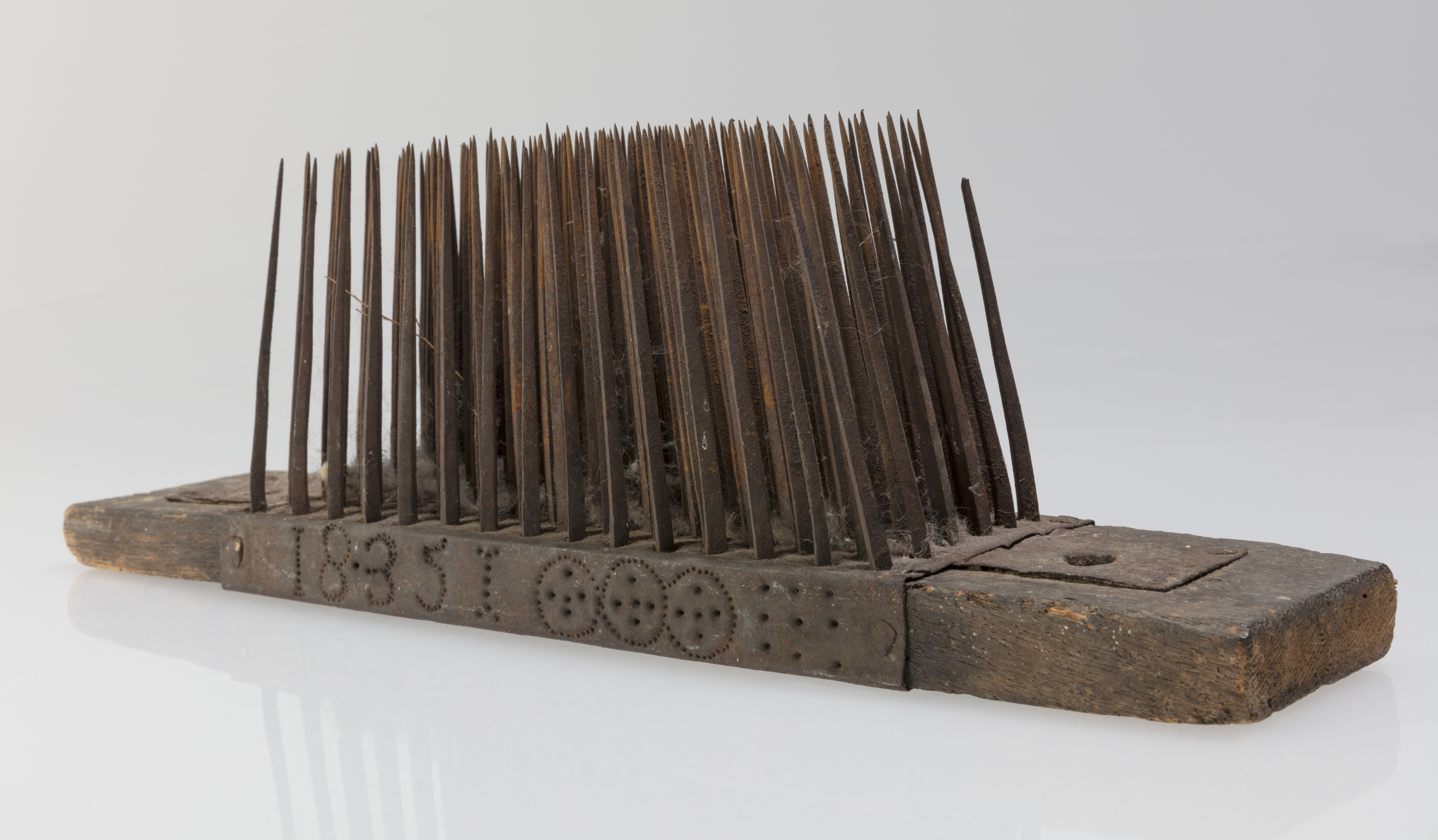
A hackle or heckle, a tool for threshing flax and preparing the fiber

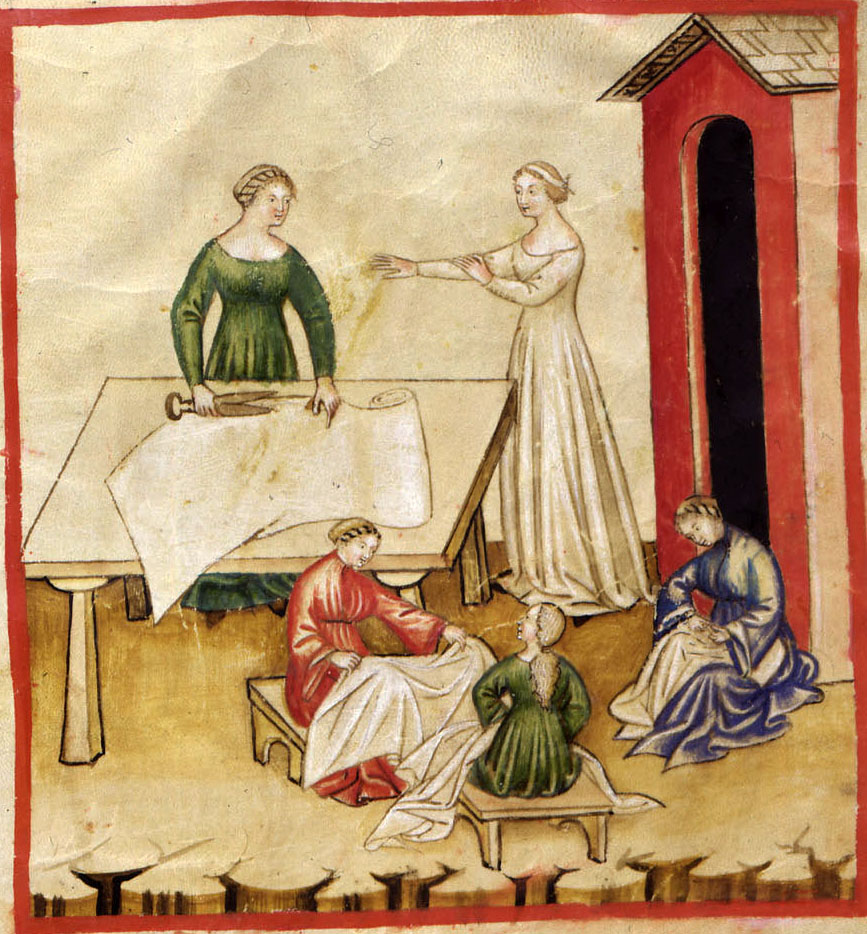
Flax tissues, Tacuinum sanitatis, 14th century

Threshing is the process of removing the seeds from the rest of the plant. Separating the usable flax fibers from other components requires pulling the stems through a hackle and/or beating the plants to break them.

Flax processing is divided into two parts: the first part is generally done by the farmer, to bring the flax fiber into a fit state for general or common purposes. This can be performed by three machines: one for threshing out the seed, one for breaking and separating the straw (stem) from the fiber, and one for further separating the broken straw and matter from the fiber.

The second part of the process brings the flax into a state for the very finest purposes, such as lace, cambric, damask, and very fine linen. This second part is performed by a refining machine.

== Uses ==
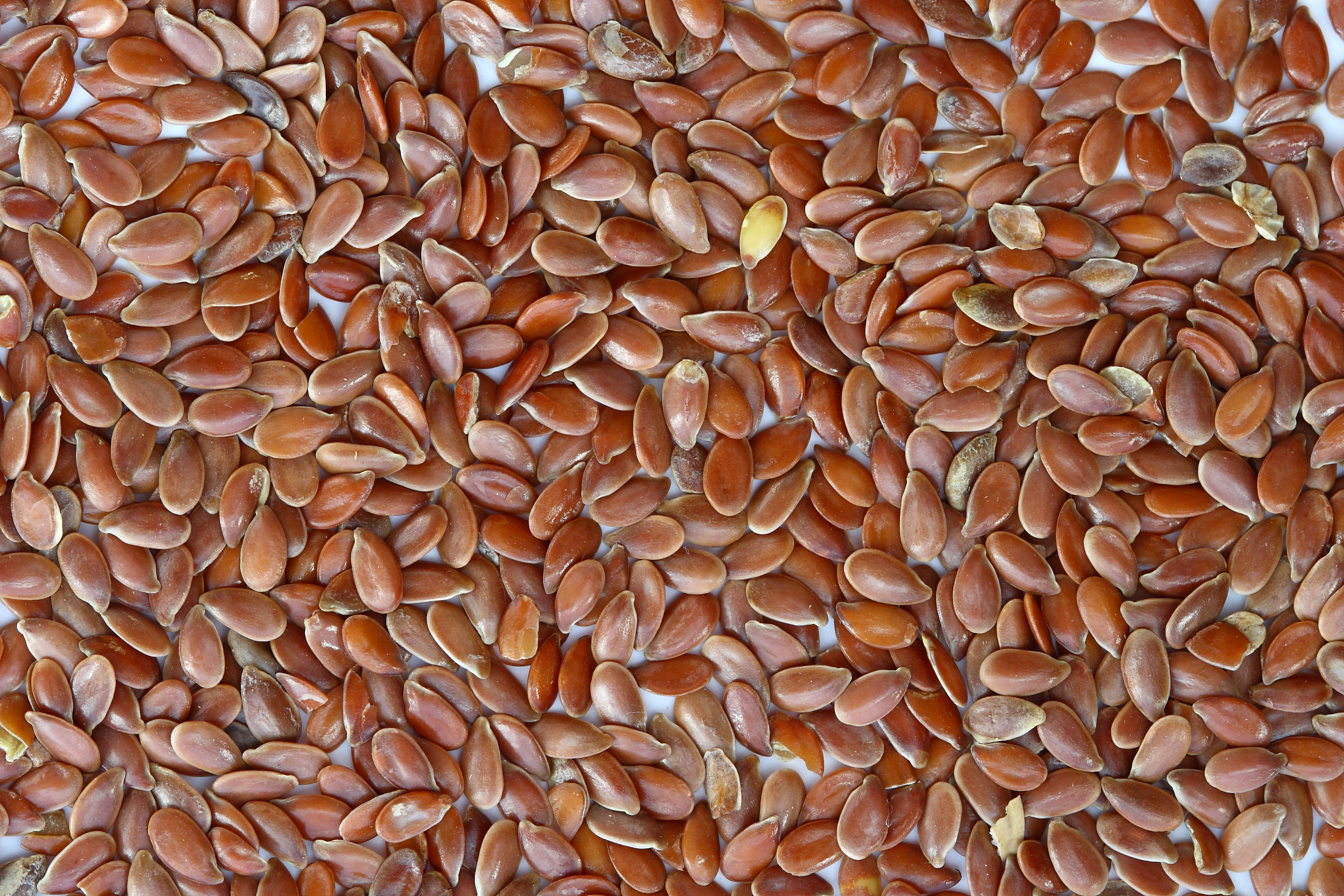
Brown flax seeds

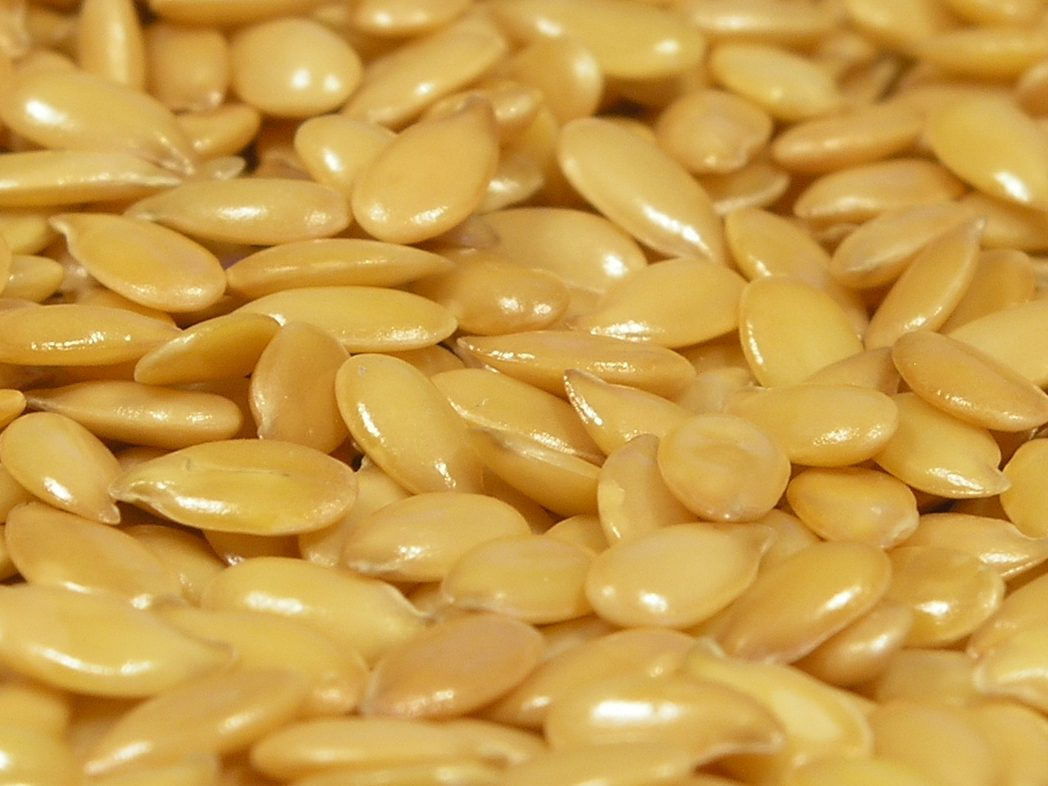
Golden flax seeds

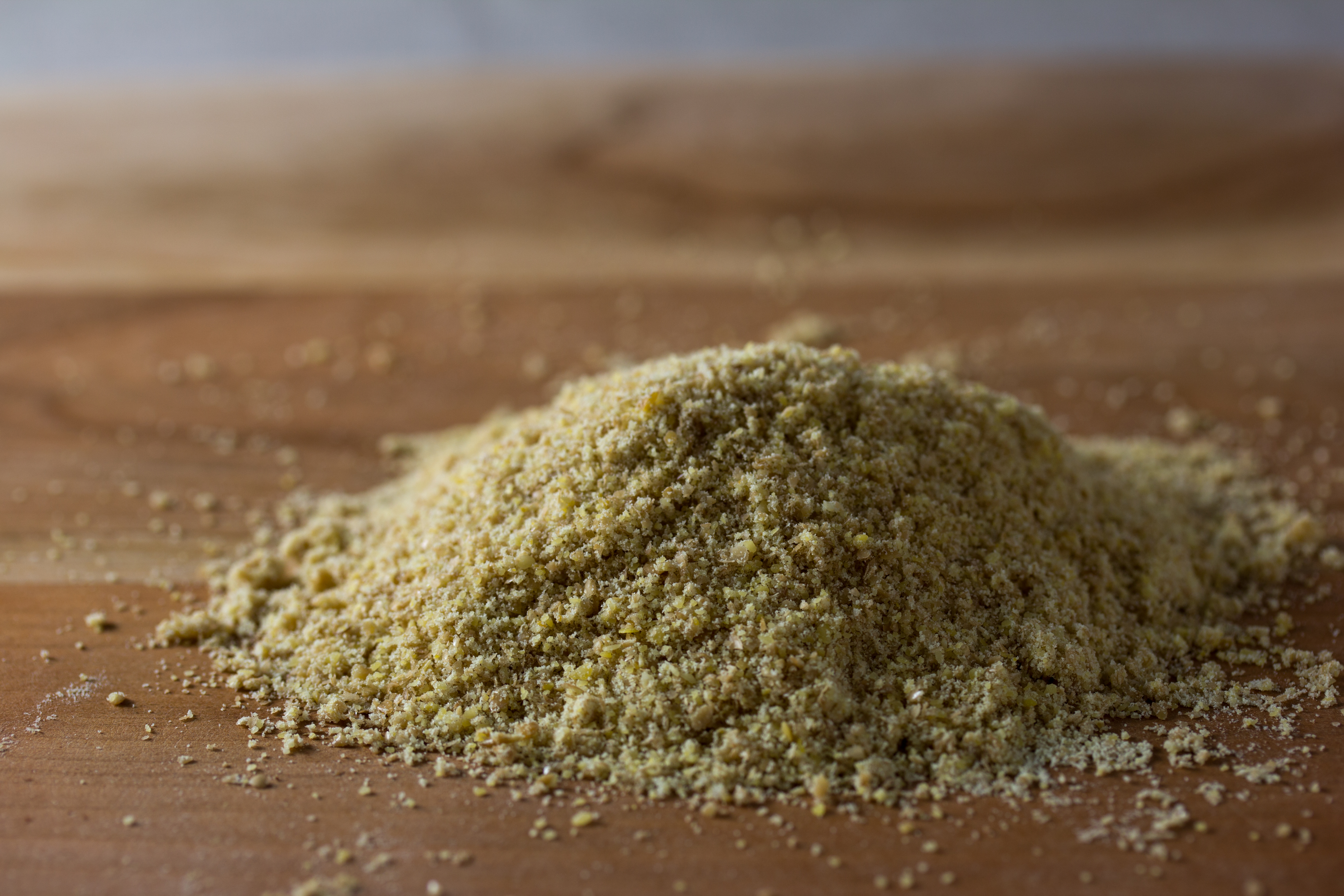
Golden flax seed meal

Flax is grown for its seeds, which can be ground into a meal or turned into linseed oil, a product used as a nutritional supplement and as an ingredient in many wood-finishing products. Flax is also grown as an ornamental plant in gardens. Moreover, flax fibers are used to make linen. The specific epithet in its binomial name, usitatissimum, means "most useful".

Flax fibers taken from the stem of the plant are two to three times as strong as cotton fibers. Additionally, flax fibers are naturally smooth and straight. Europe and North America both depended on flax for plant-based cloth until the 19th century, when cotton overtook flax as the most common plant for making rag-based paper. Flax is grown on the Canadian prairies for linseed oil, which is used as a drying oil in paints and varnishes and in products such as linoleum and printing inks.

Linseed meal, the by-product of producing linseed oil from flax seeds, is used as livestock fodder.

=== Flax seeds ===
Flax seeds occur in brown and yellow (golden) varieties. Most types of these basic varieties have similar nutritional characteristics and equal numbers of short-chain omega-3 fatty acids. Yellow flax seeds, called solin (trade name "Linola"), have a similar oil profile to brown flax seeds and both are very high in omega-3s (alpha-linolenic acid (ALA), specifically). Flax seeds produce a vegetable oil known as flax seed oil or linseed oil, which is one of the oldest commercial oils. It is an edible oil obtained by expeller pressing and sometimes followed by solvent extraction. Solvent-processed flax seed oil has been used for centuries as a drying oil in painting and varnishing.

==== Culinary ====
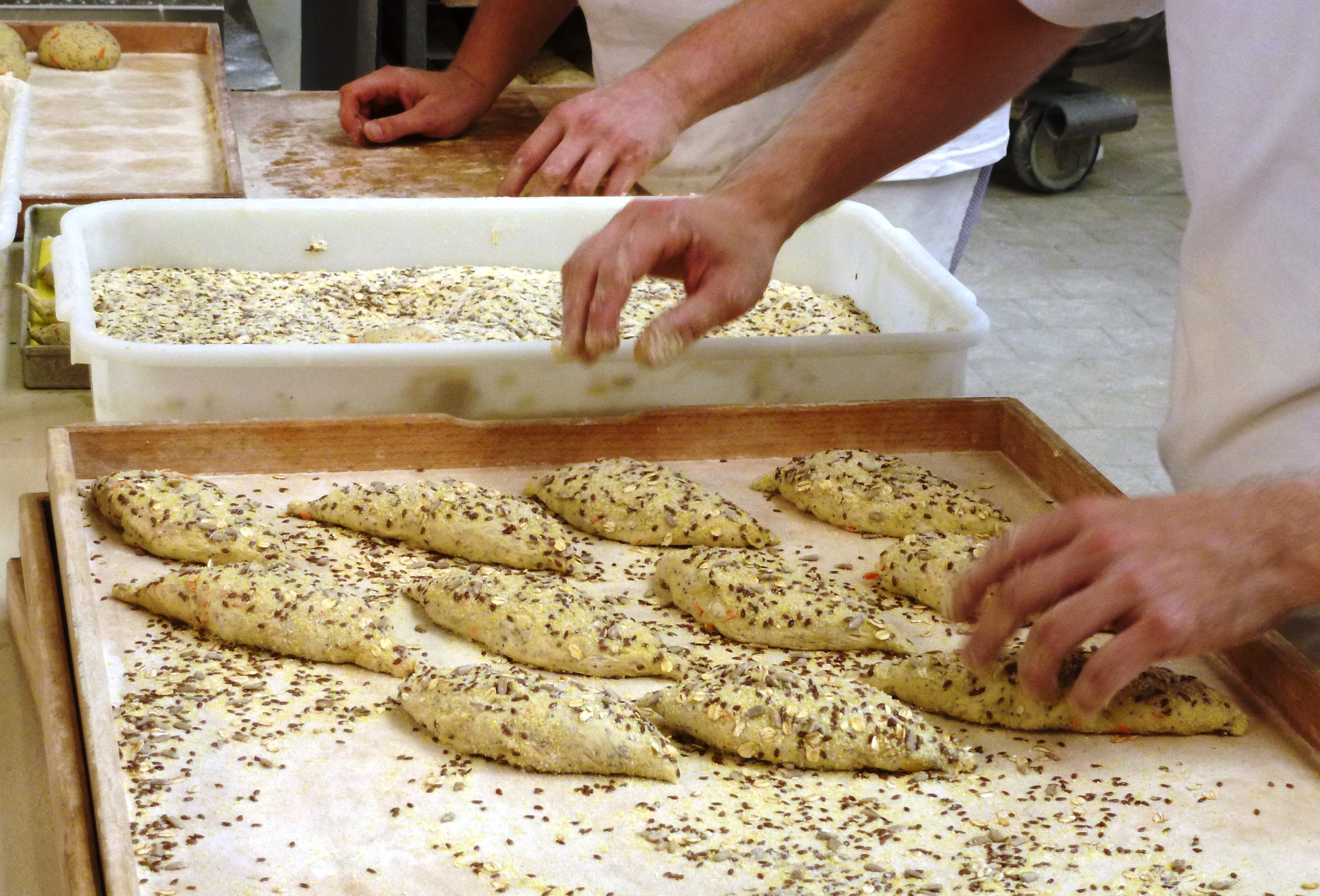
Bread rolls being topped with flax seeds before baking

Whole flax seeds are chemically stable, but ground flax seed meal, because of oxidation, may go rancid when left exposed to air at room temperature in as little as a week. Refrigeration and storage in sealed containers will keep ground flax seed meal for a longer period before it turns rancid. Under conditions similar to those found in commercial bakeries, trained sensory panelists could not detect differences between bread made with freshly ground flax seed and bread made with flax seed that had been milled four months earlier and stored at room temperature. If packed immediately without exposure to air and light, milled flax seed is stable against excessive oxidation when stored for nine months at room temperature, and under warehouse conditions, for 20 months at ambient temperatures.

Three phenolic glucosides—secoisolariciresinol diglucoside, p-coumaric acid glucoside, and ferulic acid glucoside—are present in commercial bread containing flax seed.

===== Nutrition =====
Flax seeds
Nutritional value per 100 g (3.5 oz)
- Energy: 2,234 kJ (534 kcal)
- Carbohydrates: 28.88 g
- Sugars: 1.55 g
- Dietary fiber: 27.3 g
- Fat: 42.16 g
- Saturated: 3.663 g
- Monounsaturated: 7.527 g
- Polyunsaturated omega−3 omega−6: 28.730 g 22.8 g 5.9 g
- Protein: 18.29 g
Vitamins and minerals
Vitamins	Quantity %DV^{†}
Thiamine (B1)	137% 1.644 mg
Riboflavin (B2)	12% 0.161 mg
Niacin (B3)	19% 3.08 mg
Pantothenic acid (B5)	20% 0.985 mg
Vitamin B6	28% 0.473 mg
Folate (B9)	22% 87 μg
Vitamin C	1% 0.6 mg
Minerals	Quantity %DV^{†}
Calcium	20% 255 mg
Iron	32% 5.73 mg
Magnesium	93% 392 mg
Phosphorus	51% 642 mg
Potassium	27% 813 mg
Zinc	39% 4.34 mg
- Other constituents: Quantity
- Water: 7 g
- Link to USDA Database entry
- ^{†}Percentages estimated using US recommendations for adults, except for potassium, which is estimated based on expert recommendation from the National Academies.

Flax seeds are 7% water, 18% protein, 29% carbohydrates, and 42% fat (see table). In 100 grams (3.5 oz) as a reference amount, flax seeds provide 534 kilocalories and contain high levels (20% or more of the Daily Value, DV) of protein, dietary fiber, several B vitamins, and dietary minerals (table). Flax seeds are especially rich in thiamine, magnesium, and phosphorus (table).

As a percentage of total fat, flax seeds contain 54% omega-3 fatty acids (mostly ALA), 18% omega-9 fatty acids (oleic acid), and 6% omega-6 fatty acids (linoleic acid); the seeds contain 9% saturated fat, including 5% as palmitic acid (table). Flax seed oil contains 53% 18:3 omega-3 fatty acids (mostly ALA) and 13% 18:2 omega-6 fatty acids (table source).

===== Health research =====
A meta-analysis showed that consumption of more than 30 g of flax-seed daily for more than 12 weeks reduced body weight, body mass index (BMI), and waist circumference for persons with a BMI greater than 27. Another meta-analysis showed that consumption of flax seeds for more than 12 weeks produced small reductions in systolic blood pressure and diastolic blood pressure. A third showed that consuming flax seed or its derivatives may reduce total and LDL-cholesterol in the blood, with greater benefits in women and people with high cholesterol. A fourth showed a small reduction in c-reactive protein (a marker of inflammation) only in persons with a body mass index greater than 30.

===== Linseed oil =====
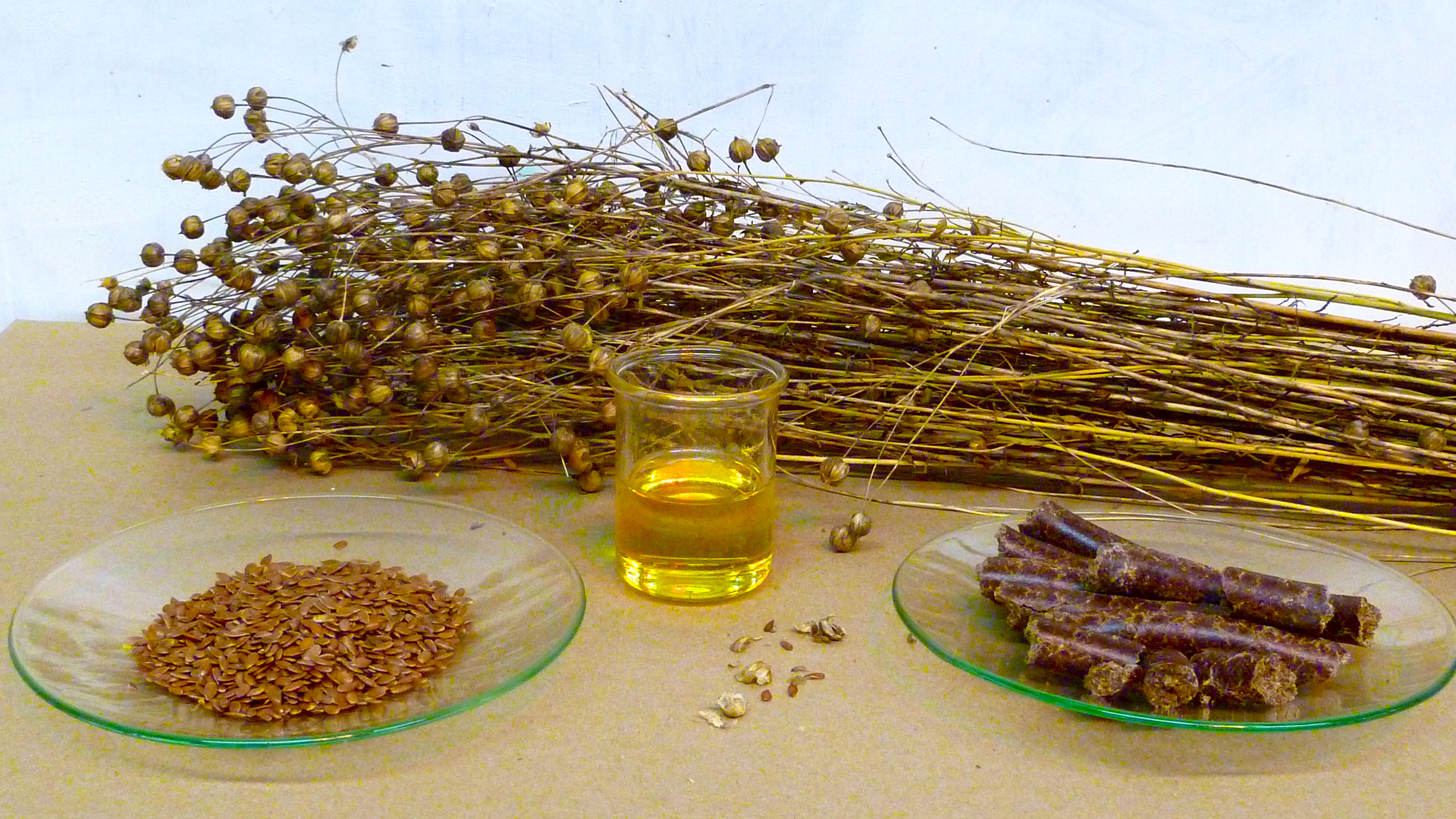
Flax, flax seeds, linseed oil, linseed cake

Linseed oil, also known as flaxseed oil or flax oil (in its edible form), is a colorless to yellowish oil obtained from the dried, ripened seeds of the flax plant (Linum usitatissimum). The oil is obtained by pressing, sometimes followed by solvent extraction.

Owing to its polymer-forming properties, linseed oil is often blended with combinations of other oils, resins, or solvents as an impregnator, drying oil finish, or varnish in wood finishing; as a pigment binder in oil paints; as a plasticizer and hardener in putty; and in the manufacture of linoleum. Linseed oil use has declined since the 1950s with increased availability of synthetic alkyd resins, which function similarly, are petroleum-based, and resist yellowing.

===== Safety =====
Flax seed and its oil are generally recognized as safe for human consumption. Like many common foods, flax contains small amounts of cyanogenic glycoside, which can convert into toxic hydrogen cyanide, however they pose no health risk when consumed in typical amounts. Typical concentrations (for example, 0.48% in a sample of defatted dehusked flax seed meal) can be removed by special processing, or simply by heating. Flax seed is a potential allergen in both adults and children.

==== Fodder ====
After crushing the seeds to extract linseed oil, the resultant linseed meal is a protein-rich feed for ruminants, rabbits, and fish. It is also often used as feed for swine and poultry, and has also been used in horse concentrate and dog food. The high omega-3 fatty acid (ALA) content of linseed meal "softens" milk, eggs, and meat, which means it causes a higher unsaturated fat content and thus lowers its storage time. The high omega-3 content also has a further disadvantage, because this fatty acid oxidises and goes rancid quickly, which shortens the storage time. Linola was developed in Australia and introduced in the 1990s with less omega-3, specifically to serve as fodder. Another disadvantage of the meal and seed is that it contains a vitamin B6 (pyridoxine) antagonist, and may require this vitamin be supplemented, especially in chickens, and furthermore linseeds contain 2–7% of mucilage (fibre), which may be beneficial in humans and cattle, but cannot be digested by non-ruminants and can be detrimental to young animals, unless possibly treated with enzymes.

Linseed meal is added to cattle feed as a protein supplement. It can only be added at low percentages due to the high fat content, which is unhealthy for ruminants. Compared to oilseed meal from crucifers it measures as having lower nutrient values, however, good results are obtained in cattle, perhaps due to the mucilage, which may aid in slowing digestion and thus allowing more time to absorb nutrients. One study found that feeding flax seeds may increase omega-3 content in beef, while another found no differences. It might also act as a substitute for tallow in increasing marbling. In the US, flax-based feed for ruminants is often somewhat more expensive than other feeds on a nutrient basis. Sheep feeding on low quality forage are able to eat a large amount of linseed meal, up to 40% in one test, with positive consequences. It has been fed as a supplement to water buffaloes in India and provided a better diet than forage alone, but not as good as when substituted with soy meal. It is considered an inferior protein supplement for swine because of its fibre, vitamin antagonist, high omega-3 content, and its low lysine content, and can only be used in small amounts in the feed. Although it may increase the omega-3 content in eggs and meat, it is also an inferior and potentially toxic feed for poultry, although it can be used in small amounts. The meal is an adequate and traditional source of protein for rabbits at 8–10%. Its use in fish feeds is limited.

Raw, immature linseeds contain an amount of cyanogenic compounds and can be dangerous for monogastric animals, like horses and rabbits. Boiling removes the danger. This is not an issue in meal cake due to the processing temperature during oil extraction.

Flax straw left over from the harvesting of oilseed is not very nutritious; it is tough and indigestible and is not recommended for use as ruminant fodder, although it may be used as bedding or baled as windbreaks.

==== Warfare ====
A British biowarfare military operation plan developed from 1942 to 1944 during World War II was planned to disseminate linseed with anthrax spores to be eaten by livestock, and eventually consumed by the human population. This would have led to widespread death, but the plan was eventually abandoned for Operation Overlord.

=== Flax fibers ===
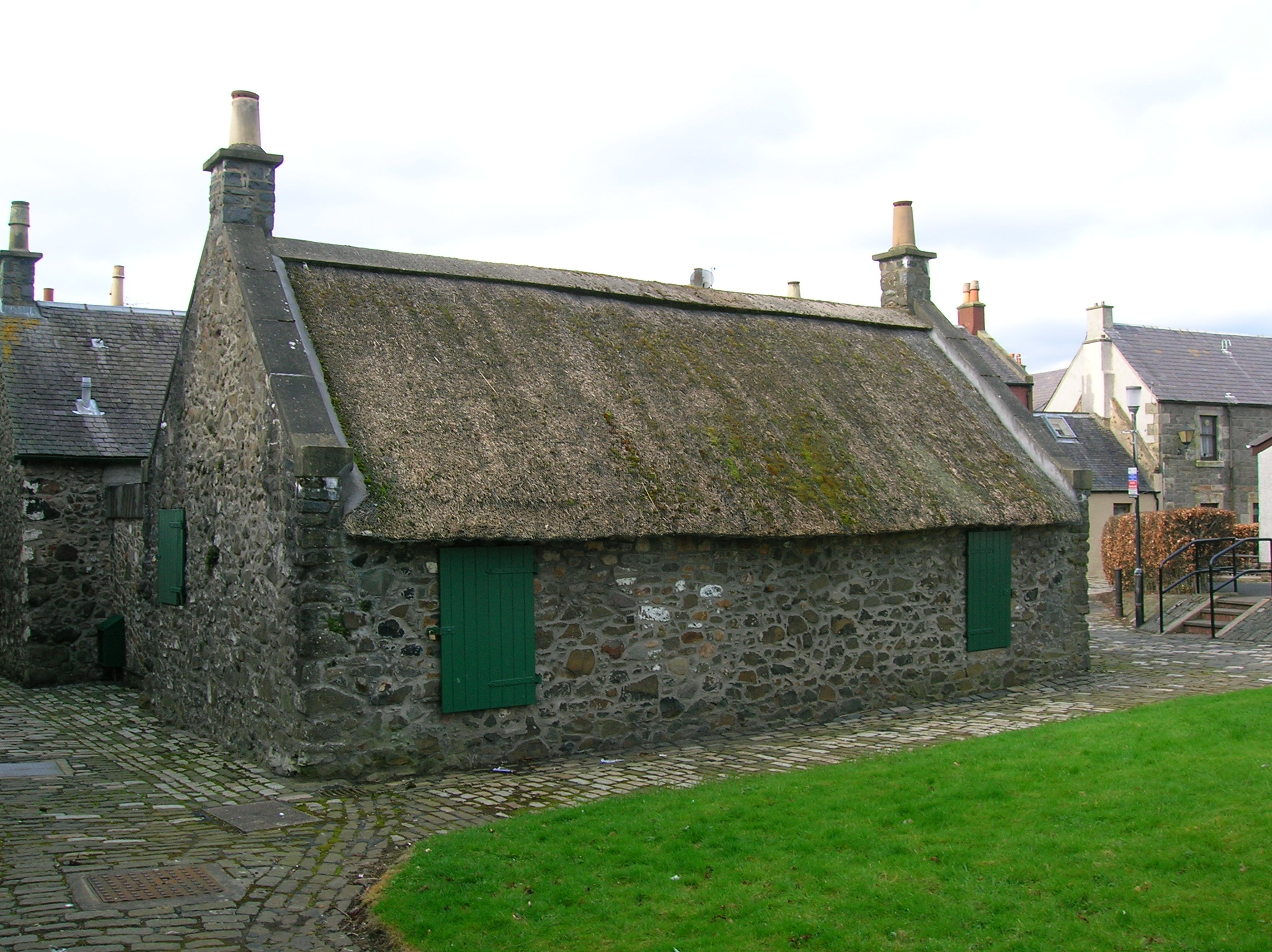
An 18th-century heckling shop once used to prepare flax fibers. North Ayrshire, Scotland.

Flax fiber is extracted from the bast beneath the surface of the stem of the flax plant. Flax fiber is soft, lustrous, and flexible; bundles of fiber have the appearance of blonde hair, hence the description "flaxen" hair. It is stronger than cotton fiber, but less elastic.

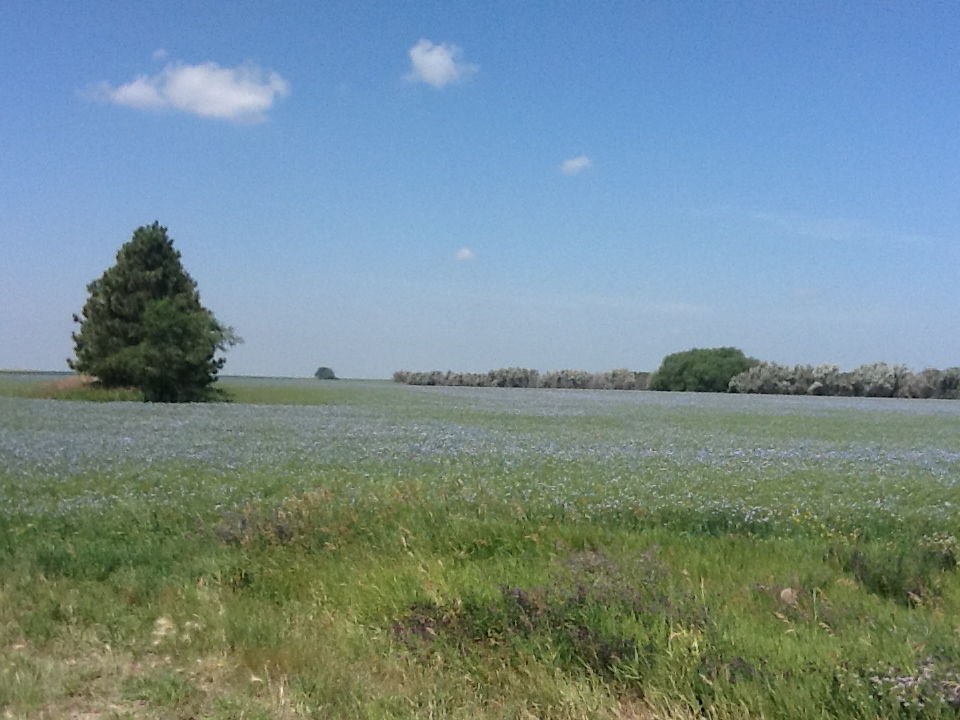
A flax field in bloom in North Dakota

The use of flax fibers dates back tens of millennia; linen, a refined textile made from flax fibers, was worn widely by Sumerian priests more than 4,000 years ago. Industrial-scale flax fiber processing existed in antiquity. A Bronze Age factory dedicated to flax processing was discovered in Euonymeia, Greece.

The best grades are used for fabrics such as damasks, lace, and sheeting. Coarser grades are used for the manufacturing of twine and rope, and historically, for canvas and webbing equipment. Flax fiber is a raw material used in the high-quality paper industry for the use of printed banknotes, laboratory paper (blotting and filter), rolling paper for cigarettes, and tea bags.

Flax mills for spinning flaxen yarn were invented by John Kendrew and Thomas Porthouse of Darlington, England, in 1787. New methods of processing flax have led to renewed interest in the use of flax as an industrial fiber.

==== Preparation for spinning ====
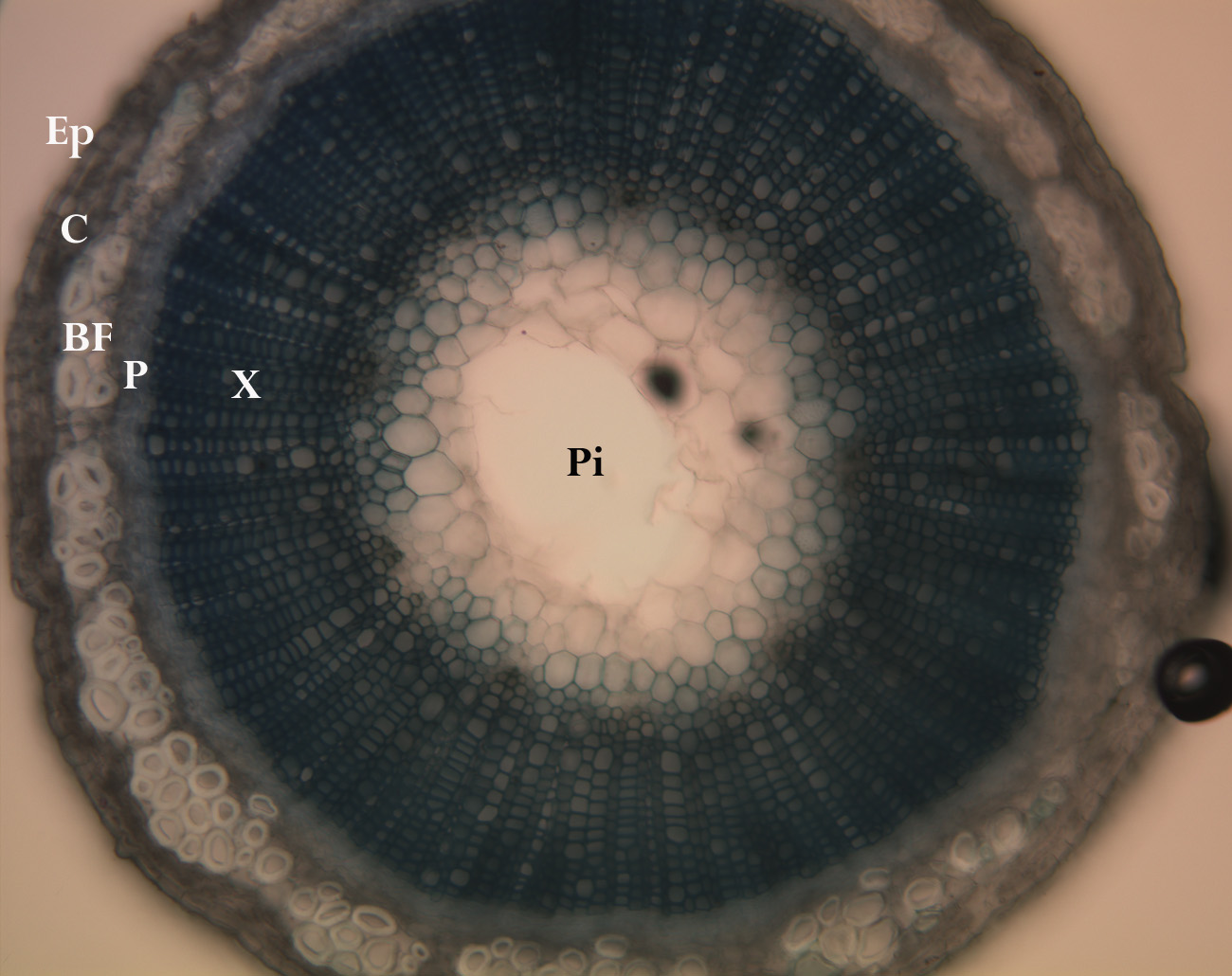
Stem cross-section, showing locations of underlying tissues: Ep = epidermis; C = cortex; BF = bast fibers; P = phloem; X = xylem; Pi = pith

Threshing, retting, and dressing flax at the Roscheider Hof Open Air Museum (Germany)

Before the flax fibers can be spun into linen, they must be separated from the rest of the stalk. The first step in this process is retting, which is the process of rotting away the inner stalk, leaving the outer parts intact. At this point, straw, or coarse outer stem (cortex and epidermis), is still remaining. To remove this, the flax is "broken", the straw is broken up into small, short bits, while the actual fiber is left unharmed. Scutching scrapes the outer straw from the fiber. The stems are then pulled through "hackles", which act like combs to remove the straw and some shorter fibers out of the long fiber.

===== Retting flax =====
Several methods are used for retting flax. It can be retted in a pond, stream, field, or tank. When the retting is complete, the bundles of flax feel soft and slimy, and quite a few fibers stand out from the stalks. When wrapped around a finger, the inner woody part springs away from the fibers. Pond retting consists of placing the flax in a pool of water which will not evaporate. It generally takes place in a shallow pool which will warm up dramatically in the sun; the process may take from a few days to a few weeks. Pond-retted flax is traditionally considered of lower quality, possibly because the product can become dirty, and is easily over-retted, damaging the fiber. This form of retting also produces quite an odor. Stream retting is similar to pool retting, but the flax is submerged in bundles in a stream or river. This generally takes longer than pond retting, but the end product is less likely to be dirty, does not smell as bad, and because the water is cooler, is less likely to be over-retted. Both pond and stream retting have fallen from favor because they pollute the waters used for the process. In Western Europe, water retting was largely abandoned in the mid-1950s in favor of dew retting.

In field retting, the flax is laid out in a large field, and dew is allowed to collect on it. This process normally takes a month or more but is generally considered to provide the highest quality flax fibers, and it produces the least pollution.

Retting can also be done in a plastic trash can or any type of water-tight container of wood, concrete, earthenware, or plastic. Metal containers will not work, as acid is produced when retting, and it would corrode the metal. If the water temperature is kept at 27 °C (80 °F), the retting process under these conditions takes 4 or 5 days. If the water is colder, it takes longer. Scum collects at the top, and an odor is given off the same as in pond retting. 'Enzymatic' retting of flax has been researched as a technique to engineer fibers with specific properties.

===== Dressing the flax =====
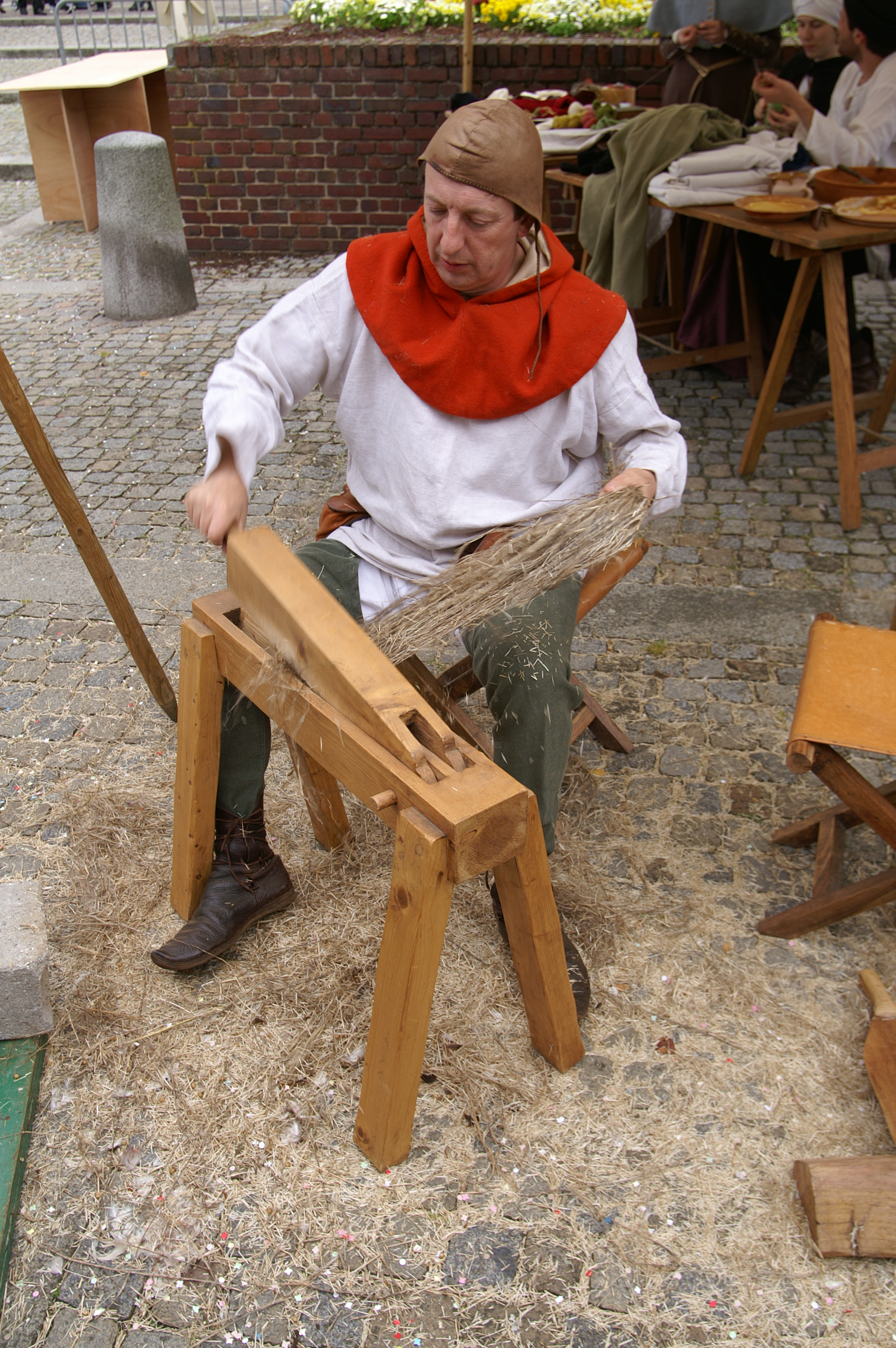
Breaking flax

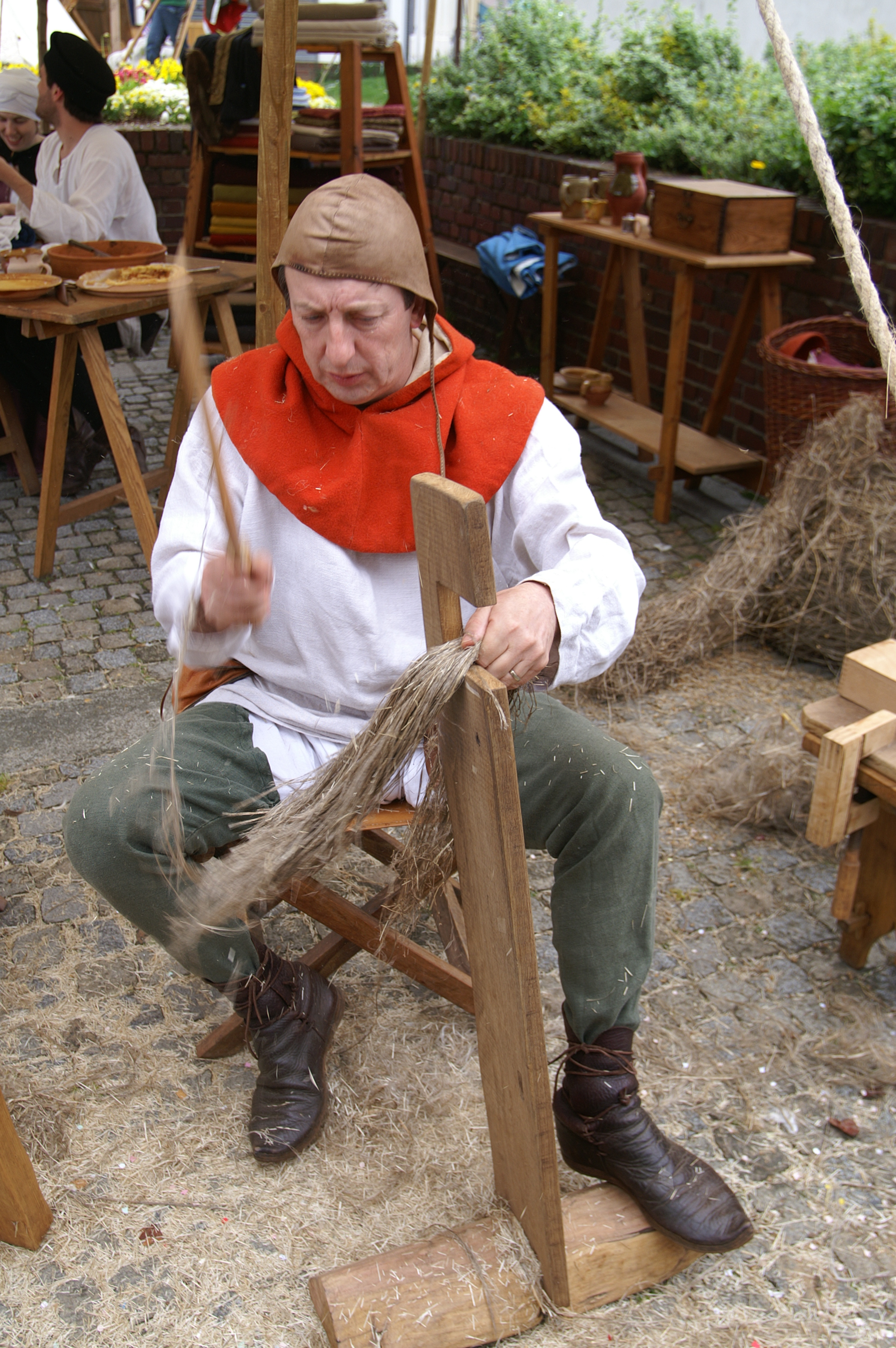
Scutching flax

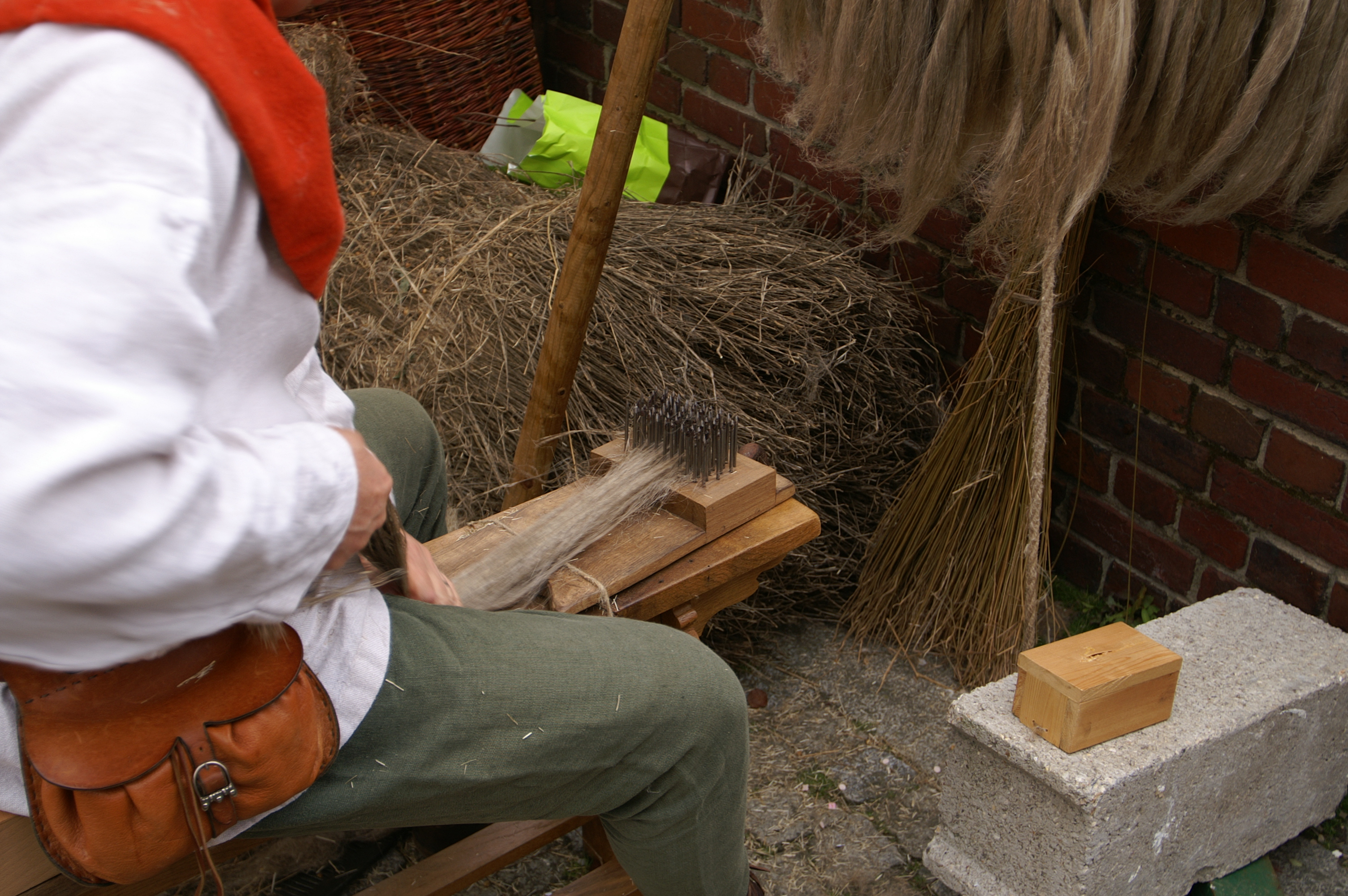
Heckling flax

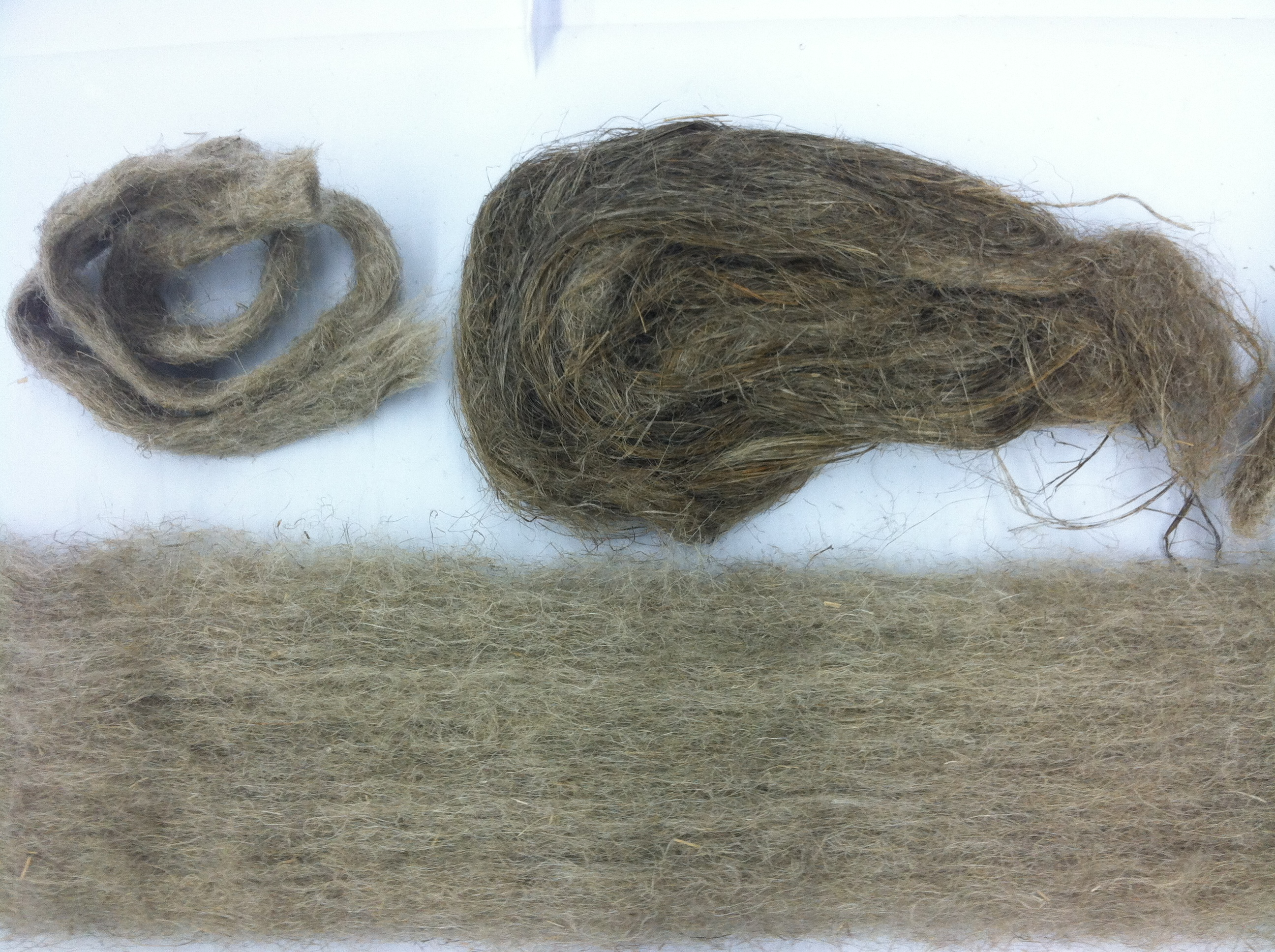
Flax fiber in different forms, before and after processing

Dressing the flax is the process of removing the straw from the fibers. Dressing consists of three steps: breaking, scutching, and heckling. The breaking breaks up the straw. Some of the straw is scraped from the fibers in the scutching process, and finally, the fiber is pulled through heckles to remove the last bits of straw.

Breaking breaks up the straw into short segments.

Scutching removes some of the straw from the fiber.

Heckling is pulling the fiber through various sizes of heckling combs or heckles. A heckle is a bed of "nails"—sharp, long-tapered, tempered, polished steel pins driven into wooden blocks at regular spacing.

== Genetically modified flax contamination ==
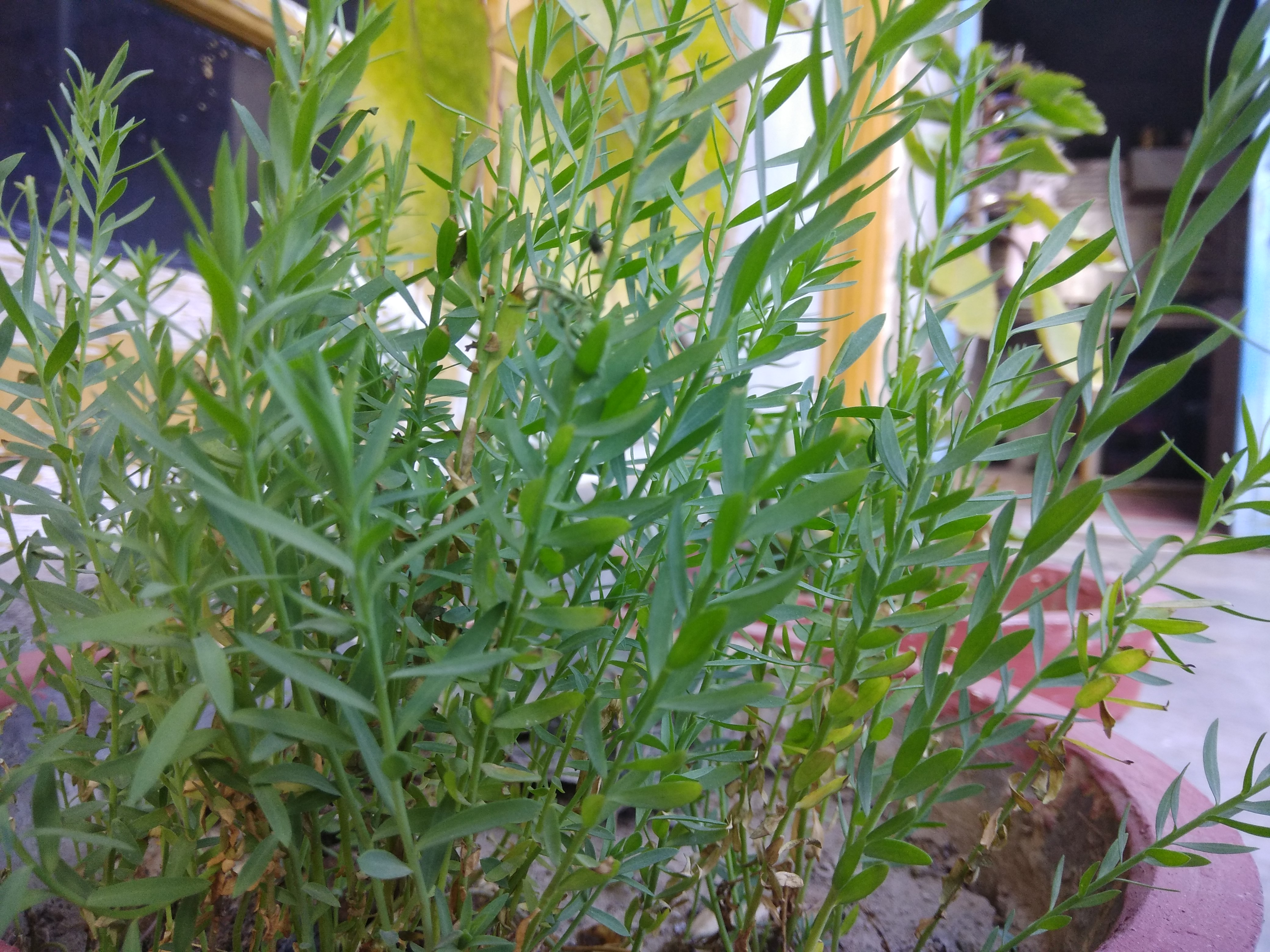
Small flax plants

In September 2009, Canadian flax exports reportedly had been contaminated by a deregistered genetically modified cultivar called 'Triffid' that had food and feed safety approval in Canada and the U.S. Canadian growers and the Flax Council of Canada raised concerns about the marketability of this cultivar in Europe where a zero tolerance policy exists regarding unapproved genetically modified organisms. Consequently, Triffid was deregistered in 2010 and never grown commercially in Canada or the U.S. Triffid stores were destroyed, but future exports and further tests at the University of Saskatchewan proved that Triffid persisted in at least two Canadian flax varieties, possibly affecting future crops. Canadian flax seed cultivars were reconstituted with Triffid-free seed used to plant the 2014 crop. Laboratories are certified to test for the presence of Triffid at a level of one seed in 10,000.

== In culture ==
Four flax flowers pictured in the coat of arms of Mulgi Parish

Lína ('flax', 'linen') and laukar ('leek') are referenced together in what is possibly a ritual formula on a 4th-century runic inscription on a knife from Fløksand, Norway. These plants are also connected in the 14th century Vǫlsa þáttr, which describes a heathen housewife in Norway using them to preserve and empower a horse's penis. While the role of the leek is likely due to its preservative and anti-bacterial properties, and association with giving life, the inclusion of the flax is less clear. Various explanations have been proposed, including that it is the female counterpart to the male leek or penis that are being ceremonially wed to bring fertility, or that the linen is being used to cover a holy object, due to it being seen as a pure fabric.

Flax is an emblem of Northern Ireland and is displayed by the Northern Ireland Assembly. In a coronet, it appeared on the reverse of the British one-pound coin to represent Northern Ireland on coins minted in 1986, 1991, and 2014. Flax also represents Northern Ireland on the badge of the Supreme Court of the United Kingdom and on various logos associated with it.

Common flax is the national flower of Belarus.

In early versions of the Sleeping Beauty tale, such as "Sun, Moon, and Talia" by Giambattista Basile, the princess pricks her finger, not on a spindle, but on a sliver of flax, which later is sucked out by her children conceived as she sleeps.

== See also ==
- Flax in New Zealand – Flax fibre (Phormium) in New Zealand
- Hemp – Agricultural cannabis plant
- Salvia hispanica – Species of flowering plant in the mint family
- International Year of Natural Fibres – United Nations observance of 2009
- Irish linen – Brand name for linen woven in Ireland
- Thomas Ferguson & Co Ltd – Irish linen Jacquard weaver
- Belgian Linen – Trademark
- Shatnez – Type of cloth
