= Linola =

Linola is the trademark name of solin, cultivated forms of flax (Linum usitatissimum) bred for producing linseed oil with a low alpha-linolenic acid content. Linola was developed in the early 1990s by the Commonwealth Scientific and Industrial Research Organisation (CSIRO). It was developed and released in Australia in 1992 and first commercially grown in 1994. Australian Linola varieties are named after Australian lakes.

== Genesis ==
This variety was developed to provide a source of edible linseed oil with a low alpha-linolenic acid (ALA) content of approximately 2%, as compared to 50% in the wild type variety. It was done to improve the storage quality of linseed when used as a bulk livestock feed. Linseed's previous main use had been linseed oil for use as a paint ingredient, with the ALA (omega-3 fatty acid) being a quick drying component. With the advent of "plastic" water-based paints, the linseed market fell into decline, but when marketed as a stock feed, the omega-3 content also deteriorated quickly in storage. Compared to normal linseed, linola has a lower level of ALA, which increases the oxidative stability of the oil/seed, which means it remains edible much longer when stored. Linola has a correspondingly higher content of the linoleic acid, omega-6 fatty acid, around 65% to 75%. The seed colour was also changed from the wild type dark brown seed to a light yellow seed, which consequently gives an oil of a light colour, easily distinguished from the darker linseed oil.

== Health claims ==
Linola is generally recognized as safe (GRAS) by the U.S. Food and Drug Administration.

== Agricultural distribution ==
Linola substitutes for flax in cropping rotations; it is claimed to have lower production costs than canola, but brings prices comparable to canola or other edible oils. Linola is produced in Australia, Canada, the U.K. and in the U.S. states of Washington and Idaho. All Canadian cultivars of Linola were deregistered for sale and use as of August 1, 2013.
