= Hackle (disambiguation) =

Hackle may refer to one of the following.

- Hackle, a feather plume attached to a headdress
- Hackle (wig making), a metal plate with rows of pointed needles used to blend or straighten hair
- Hackles, erectile plumage or hair in the neck area
- Heckling (flax), the process of dividing the ribbons of flax fibre into finer parallel filaments ready for drawing and spinning
- Heckling comb, a tool for heckling flax
- Hackle (artificial fly), a feather or feathers wrapped around the shank of a fishing hook of an artificial fly for fly fishing
