= Barnett Davenport =

American murderer

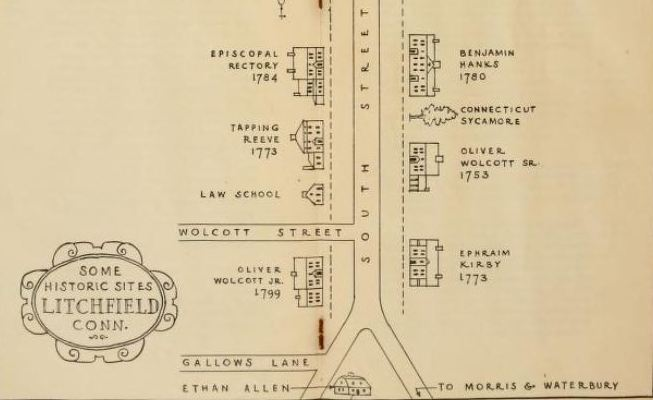
The street where the murders took place.

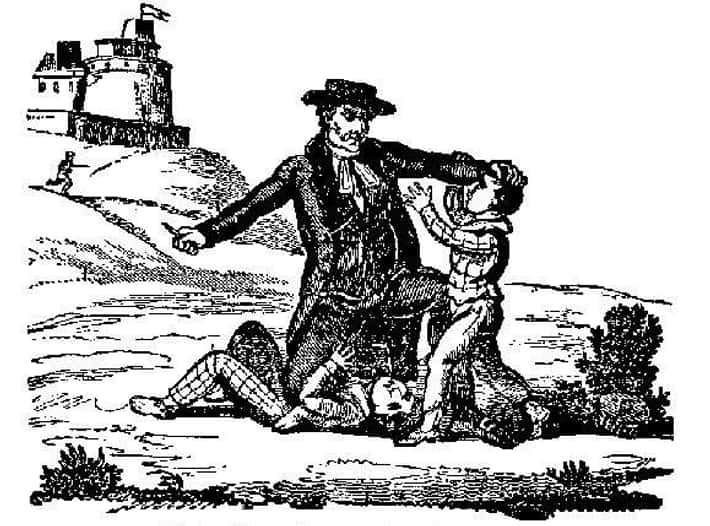
An image depicting Davenport murdering two unknown children.

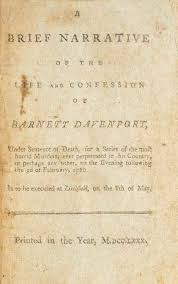
The autobiography of Barnett Davenport. Written by Davenport himself, it is talking in first person. It details his life up until his execution, including the murders.

Barnett Davenport was born in New Milford, Connecticut on October 25, 1760. He lived with his parents until he was age nine. He lived with a man named Nathan Hawley, whom he ran away from due to being allegedly abused at the age of 11. Hawley was supposed to teach him how to read, yet according to Davenport, there was no progress. He then began to steal for food. By age 12, he could not read. He was sent around to two more people, before stealing from the last one. He then lived with one Aaron Hitchcock, of whom he stole his horse. Hitchcock discovered this and threatened to punish him. Davenport then ran away after stealing some money and a silk handkerchief. By the age of 15, he had already been convicted of robbery and horse theft. In 1776, when he was 16, he joined the Continental Army under an alias. He was in Valley Forge and Monmouth, before deserting. In 1779, at the age of 19, he was poor and struggling to live. He took up his brother's name, Nicolas, and went to find work as a farm hand. He was hired by Caleb Mallory, a farmer who lived with his wife, children, and grandchildren on his estate. Mallory let Davenport stay at their house, gave him new clothes, and fed him.

== Murder of the Mallory family ==
On the evening of February 3, 1780, Davenport murdered the Mallory family. He didn't have any alleged reason to, nor any prejudices. He said that as soon as the Mallory family hired him, he had been planning their murders. It is assumed that Davenport was suffering from post-traumatic stress disorder from the war, as well as a psychotic episode. A bit after midnight, Davenport entered Caleb Mallory's home and bludgeoned him, his wife, and his granddaughter to death with a swingle. He also used the blunt end of a musket. He then looted the house, setting it on fire afterwards to cover his tracks. He did so knowing the two other grandchildren were inside sleeping.

== Arrest ==
Due to Davenport using an alias, his younger brother, who was 19 at the time, was arrested instead. They arrested him on the pretense of harboring his brother. Davenport was found hiding in a cave wall in Cornell a few days later. He was brought back to Litchfield to face trial. He made an entire confession to the Mayor. He was publicly whipped for the murders.

== Trial and execution ==
On May 8th, Davenport was sent to the Litchfield Gallows and was hanged for the murders.

== See also ==
- List of mass murderers

== General references ==
- "Gallows Lane and the Execution of Barnett Davenport - Connecticut History | a CTHumanities Project". 14 July 2021.
- "February 3: The First Mass Murder in U.S. History". 3 February 2022.
- "America's First Mass Murder". Connecticut Magazine. 3 February 2017.
- Hutson, Nancy G. (30 January 2011). "New Milford historian unearths account of America's first mass murder". NewsTimes.
