= Heckling (flax) =

Combing process used to clean and straighten scutched flax or other bast fibers

Threshing, retting and dressing flax at the Roscheider Hof Open Air Museum

Heckling (or "hackling") is the last of three steps in dressing flax, or preparing the fibers to be spun. It splits and straightens the flax fibers, as well as removes the fibrous core and impurities. Flax is pulled through heckling combs, which parts the locked fibers and makes them straight, clean, and ready to spin. After heckling and spinning, flax is ready to be woven into linen.

== Process of heckling ==
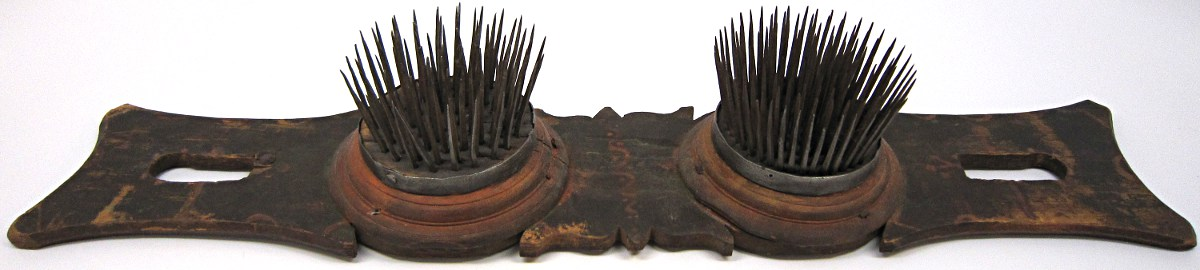
A hatchel, also known as a heckling comb, from Minnesota.

Dressing is the broad term referring to removing the fibers from the straw and cleaning it enough to be spun. Dressing consists of three steps: breaking, scutching and heckling. After breaking, some of the straw is scraped from the fibers in the scutching process, then the fiber is pulled through various sized heckling combs, or hackles. Different sized heckling combs are used, progressing from coarser combs with only a few prongs or nails per inch, to finer combs. Generally three heckling combs are used; however, many more can be used. The finer the final heckling comb, the finer the yarn spun from that flax can be. An example of a progression of five combs is first using a heckling comb with four nails per square inch, then one with 12 per inch, then 25, next 48, and finally 80 nails per inch. The first three remove the straw, and the last two split and polish the fibers.

The shorter fibers that remain in the heckling comb after the flax has been combed are called tow. If the heckle is fine enough, the tow can be carded like wool and spun, otherwise it can be spun like the other flax fibers. Tow produces a coarser yarn than the fibers pulled through the heckles because it will still have some straw in it. While this yarn is not suitable for fine linens, it can be used for bagging, rough sheets, cords or ropes.

Heckling was originally done by hand, but began in the nineteenth century to be undertaken mechanically, with rollers drawing the slivers of flax through the hackles. The machine used for this is called a gill. At first this was similar in form to traditional hackles, but later the screw-gill was invented. Key innovators in developing this technology were Philippe de Girard, Samuel Lawson (inventor of the screw-gill), and Peter Fairbairn.

== Etymology ==
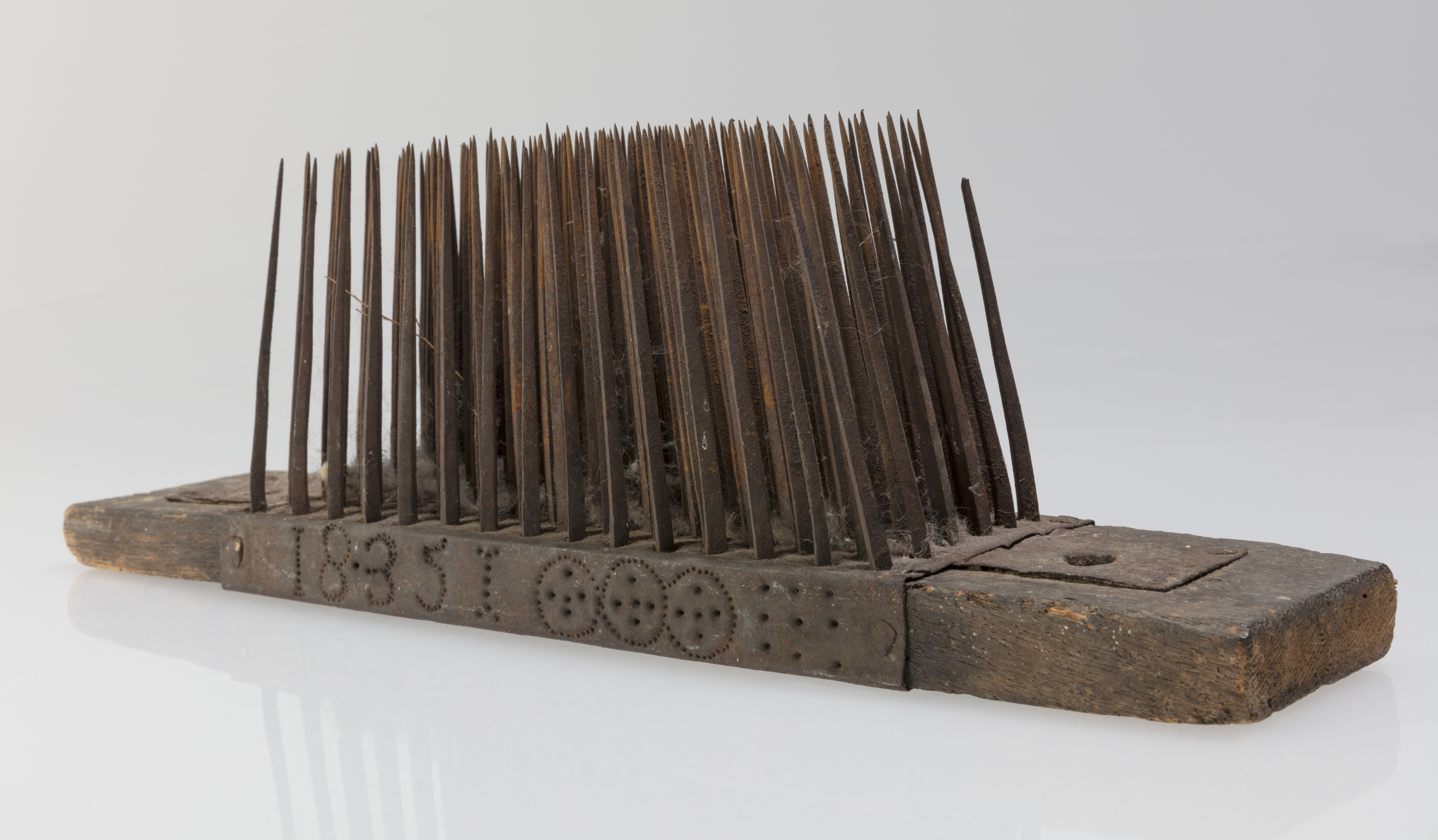
A hackle or heckle

The noun "heckle" is thought to be derived from Old English, with Middle English forms hechele, hetchell (c1300), hekele (c1440), hakell (1485), and later hatchel. The terms "heckle," "hackle" and "hackel" are used interchangeably at present.

== In popular culture ==
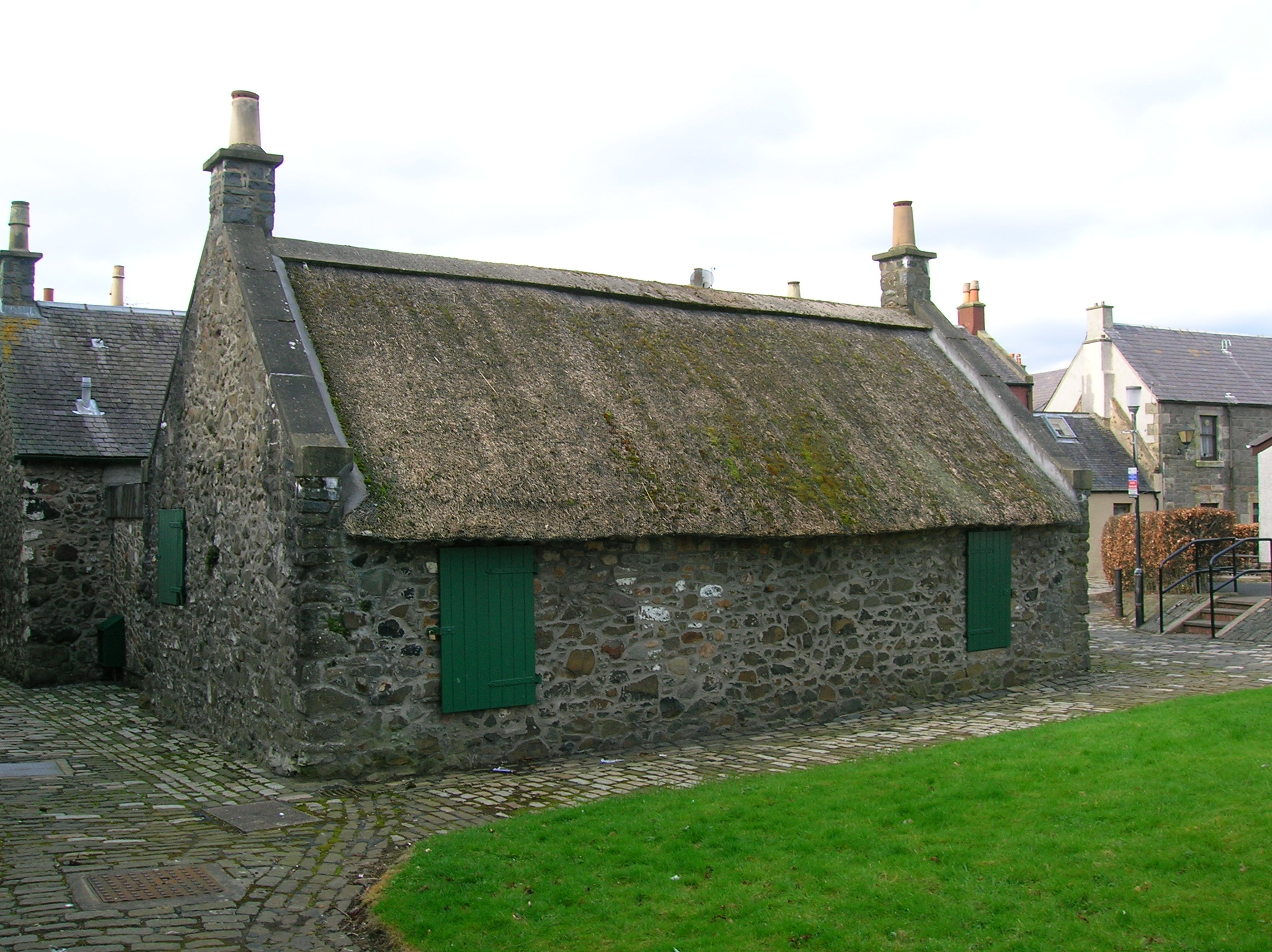
The Heckling Shop in Irvine, where Burns worked.

As a farmer, the poet Robert Burns grew flax, and during 1781 he took work as a flax-dresser in a heckling shop, to try his alternative career. It was dusty monotonous work, with a sickening smell from the flax, and damaged his health so he left this employment at the end of the year. He had widened his ideas at a bookshop in the town, and was encouraged by others to work towards publishing his poetry.

Prior to the industry becoming mechanised and moving to East Ulster, hackling was a rural based cottage industry with Cootehill in Ireland as Ulster's largest market. The Hackler from Grouse Hall is an Irish song written in the late 1880s by a local man, Peter Smith, from Stravicnabo, Lavey, Cavan, Ireland. It has been sung by Christy Moore, Planxty and Damien Dempsey. In the 1990s a product known as The Hackler, an Irish poitin, was developed by Cooley Distillery. So popular was this song that the promotional literature originally referred incorrectly to a hackler as a maker of Poitín. This error was subsequently corrected.

== See also ==
- Hand processing flax
- Linen production
