= Hackle (wig making) =

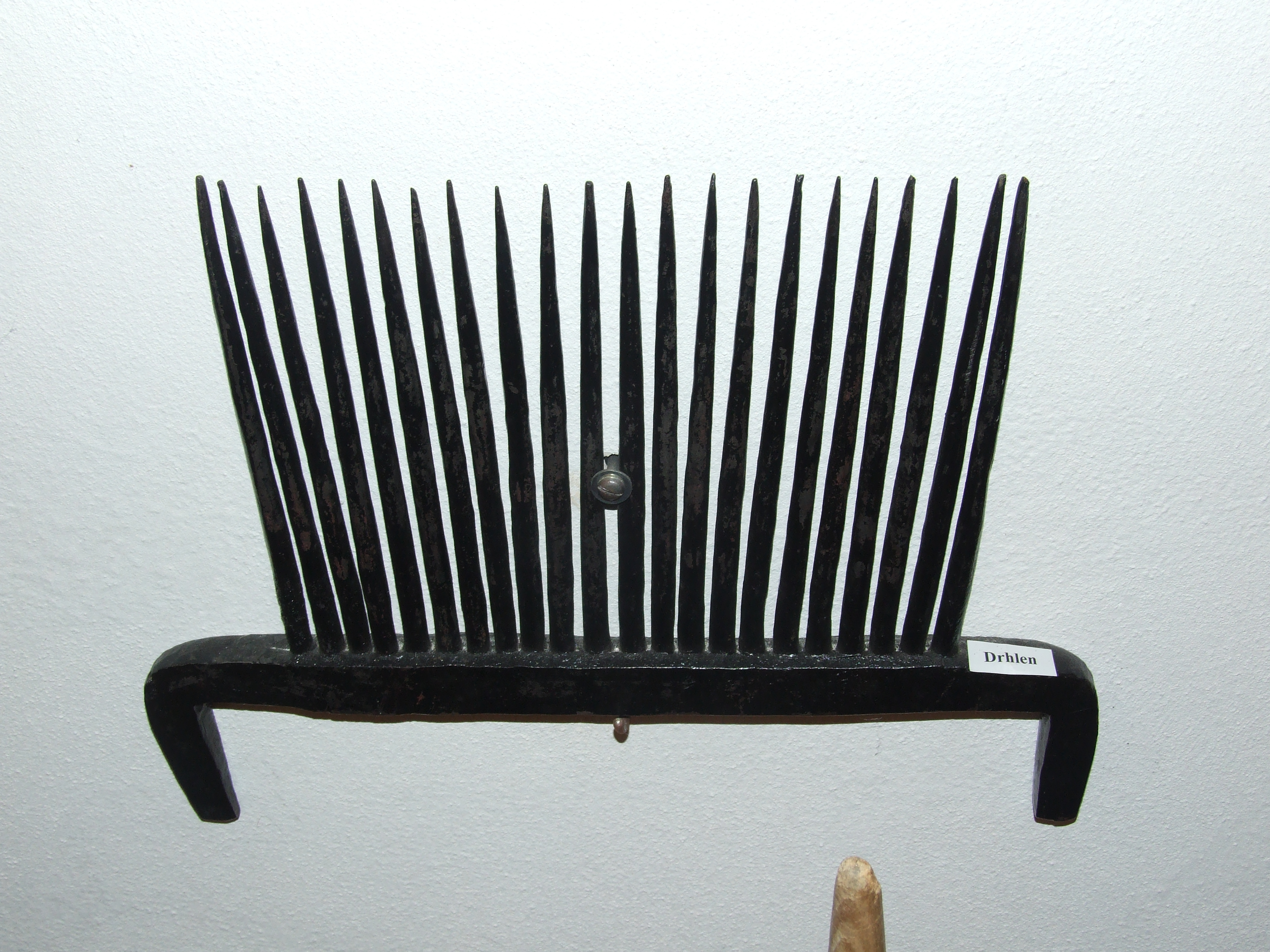
A hackle or heckle

A hackle is a metal plate with rows of pointed needles used to blend or straighten hair (or flax, for which see heckling comb). This tool is used as a preliminary step in the process of custom wig making. It is typically clamped firmly to a table before use.

== Overview ==
The pointed needles are very sharp. This is paramount, because the hackle is used for three main purposes: mixing or blending hairs in special blends of colours, untangling wigs or hair extensions, and preparing the hair in a single or double draw.

For single drawn, the shortest hairs in the bundle at the root area are removed. For double drawn, the hackle is drawn with one bundle in it, separating their different lengths. Any double drawn (DD) hair tends to be far more expensive than any other hairs because for four ounces of DD, over a kilogram of single drawn, especially long lengths, of hair is used. In DD, all hairs have the same length, typical wigs with DD hairs are Sheitels.

== See also ==
- Heckling (flax)
