= The Hills of Connemara =

Irish folk song

"The Hills of Connemara" is an Irish folk song written by Sean McCarthy about Irish moonshine, or Poitín, set in Connemara. In the song, the drink is referred to as "mountain tea" (tay to rhyme with day, which is a common pronunciation in this region derived from the Gaelic term for tea, 'tae'.). The punch line to the song is that the tax collectors ("excise men") find the cache of moonshine and begin "drinkin' it straight".
