= Scutching =

Process of separating and cleaning vegetable fiber before spinning

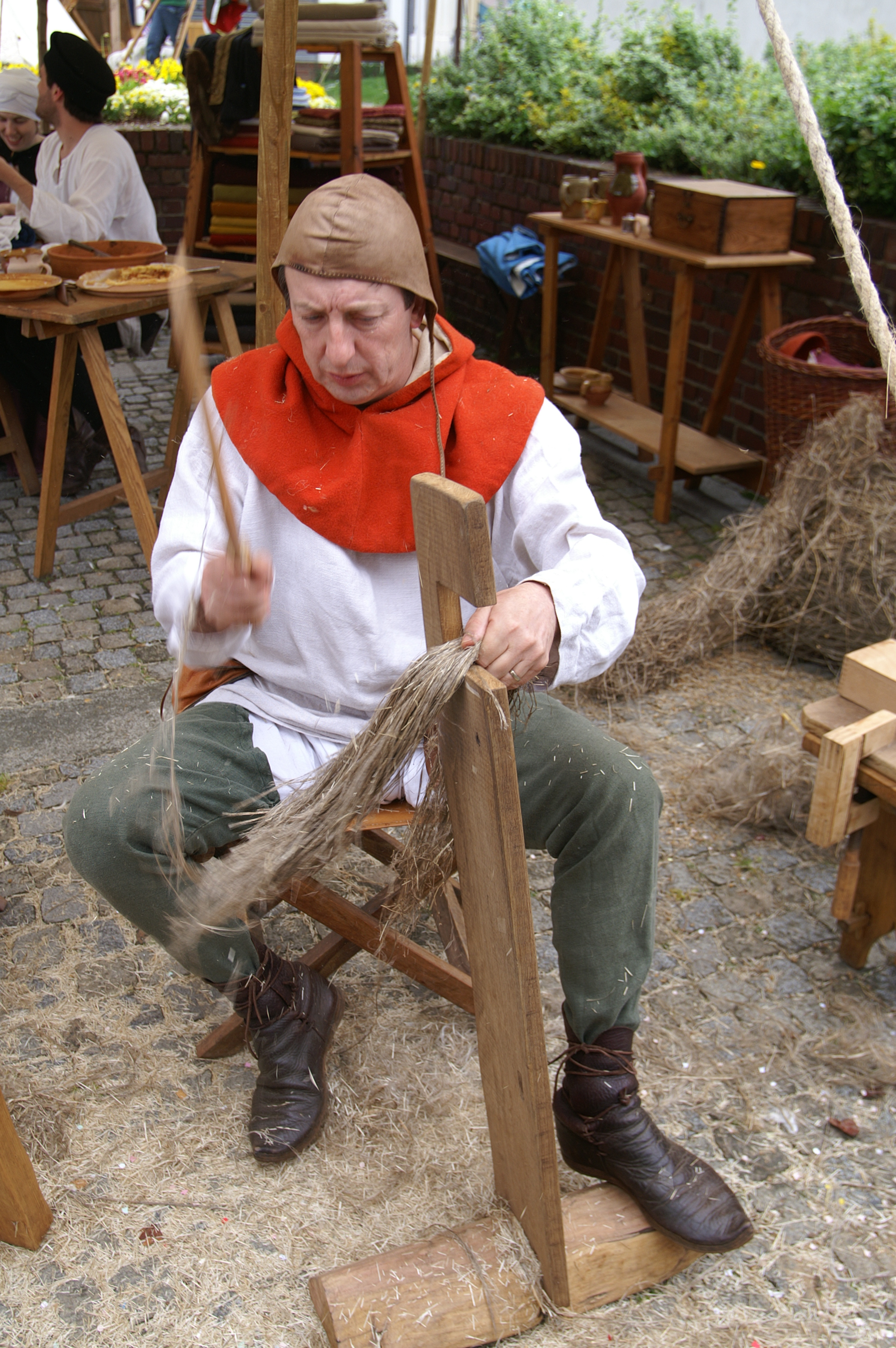
A person scutching flax

Threshing, retting and dressing flax at the Roscheider Hof Open Air Museum

Scutching is a step in the processing of cotton or the dressing of flax or hemp in preparation for spinning. The scutching process separates the impurities from the raw material, such as the seeds from raw cotton or the straw and woody stem from flax fibers. Scutching can be done by hand or by a machine known as a scutcher. Hand scutching of flax is done with a wooden scutching knife and a small iron scraper. The end products of scutching flax are the long finer flax fibers called line, short coarser fibers called tow, and waste woody matter called shives.

In the early days of the cotton industry, the raw material was manually beaten with sticks after being placed on a mesh, a process known as willowing or batting. The task was mechanised by the development of machines known as willowers. Scutching machines were introduced in the early 19th century. These processed the raw material into a continuous sheet of cotton wadding known as a lap.

== Cotton scutching ==
Before cotton is processed, it has to be cleaned of its seeds and other impurities. In the early days, this was done by spreading the raw cotton on a mesh and beating it by hand with sticks, a process known as willowing or batting. A scutching machine for cotton (known as a scutcher) was invented in 1797, but did not get much attention until it was introduced in the cotton mills of Manchester in 1808 or '09. By 1816, scutchers had been generally adopted.

The scutching machine passes the cotton through a pair of rollers, then strikes it with iron or steel bars, called beaters. The rapidly turning beaters strike the cotton hard and knock the seeds out. This process is done over a series of parallel bars, allowing the seeds to fall through. At the same time, air is blown across the bars, which carries the cotton into a cotton chamber. The end result is a continuous sheet of cotton wadding known as a lap, ready for the next stage of the production process, known as carding.

== Flax scutching ==
=== By hand ===
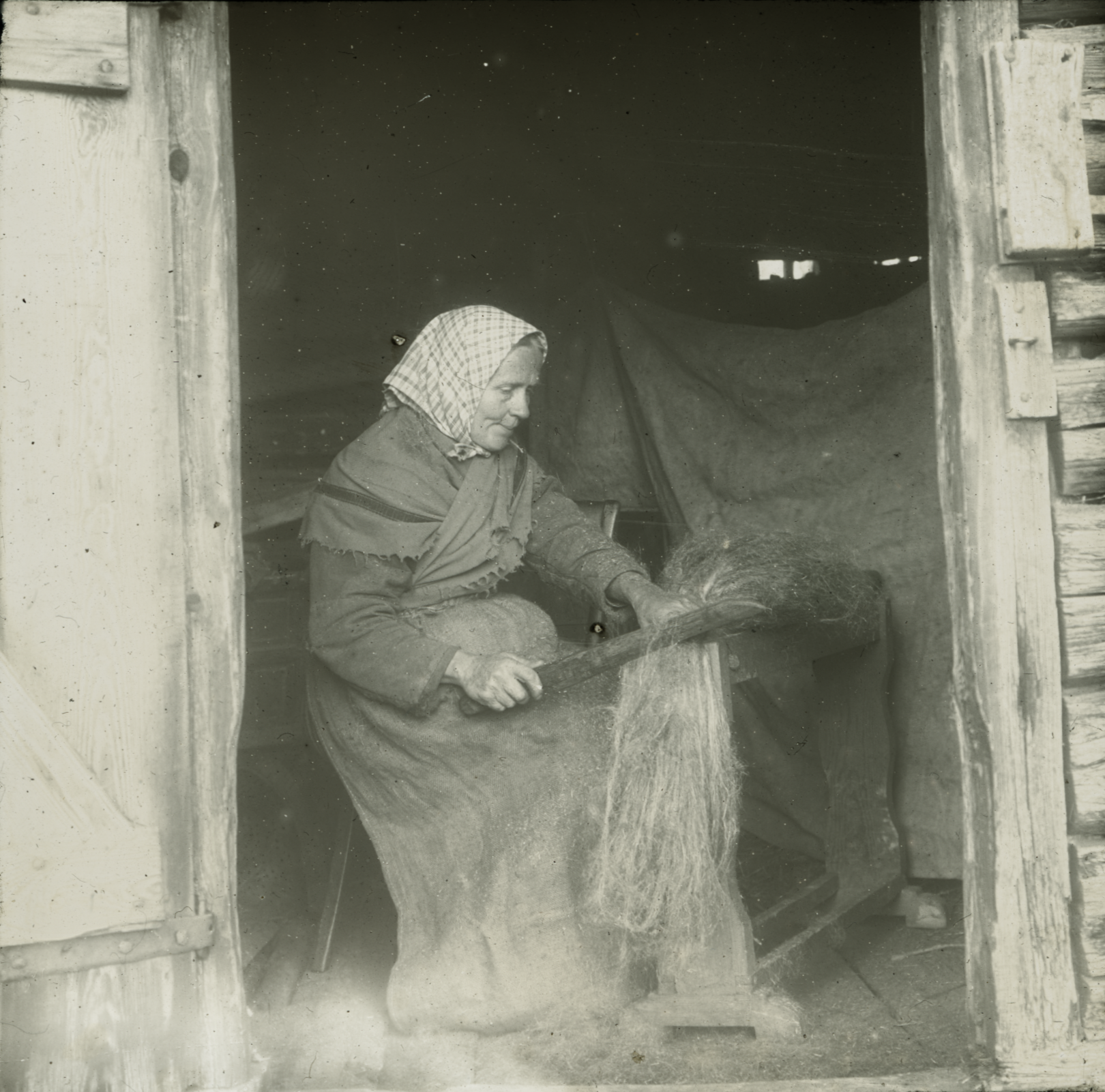
A Swedish woman scutching flax by hand, early 20th century.

To scutch flax by hand, the scutching knife is scraped down with a sharp strike against the fibers while they hang vertically. The edge of the knife is scraped along the fibers to pull away pieces of the stalk. This is repeated until all of the stalk has been removed and the flax is smooth and silky. When scutching was done by hand, people could scutch up to 15 pounds (6.8 kg) of flax in one day, depending on the quality of the flax, as coarser flax, harder flax, and poorly retted flax takes longer to scutch. Retting removes the pectins that bind the fibers to the stalk and each other, so under-retted flax is harder to separate from the stalk, and often gets damaged in the scutching process. Over-retting the flax causes the fibers to deteriorate and break. These broken fibres are called codilla, which can be used along with heckled tow to make yarn.

In the scutching process, some of the fiber is also scutched away along with the stalk, a normal part of the process.

=== By machine ===
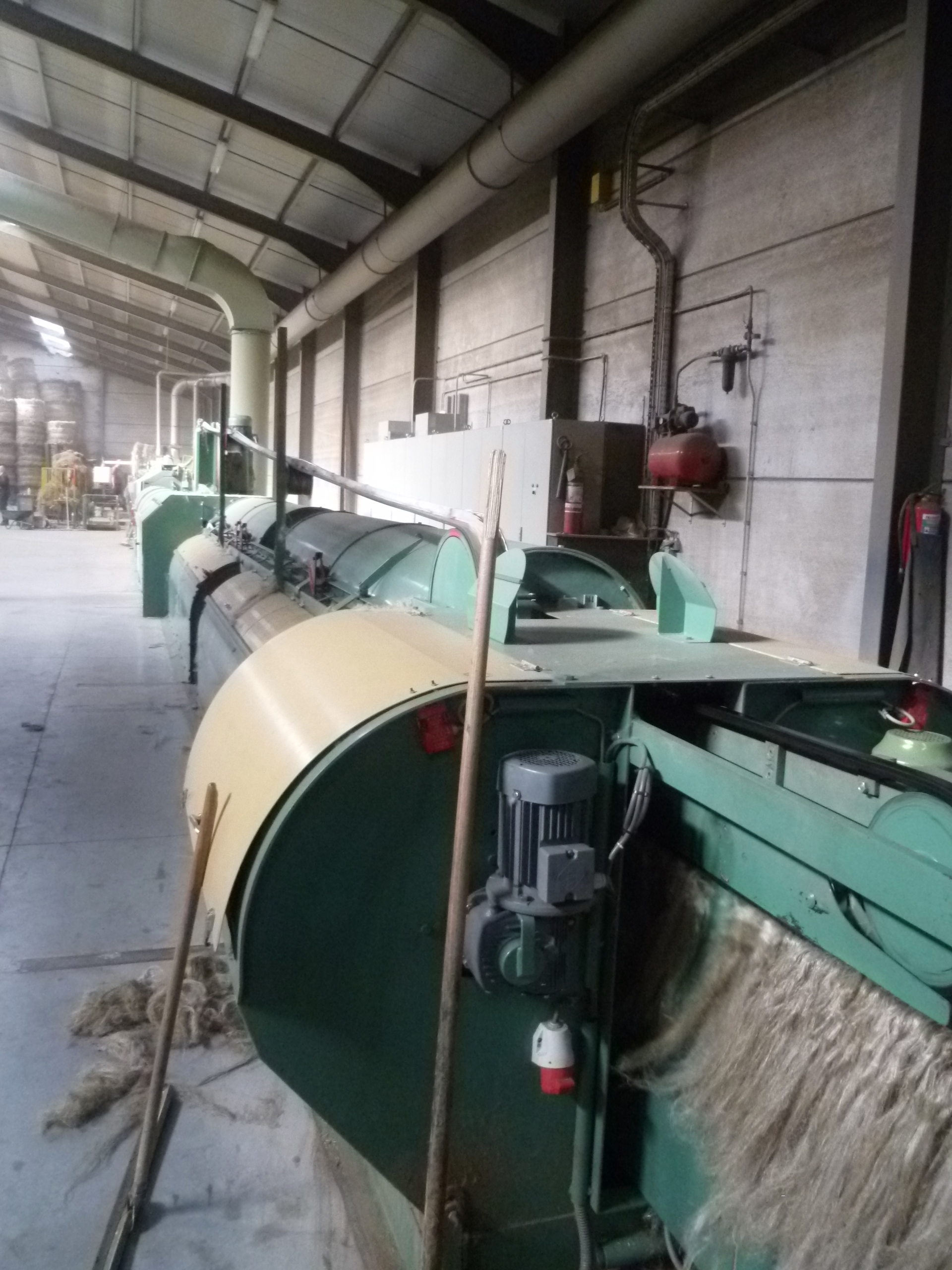
Flax scutching machine

Scutching is done several ways by machine. Scutching mills started in Ireland, and were commonly used there by 1850, at a time when hand scutching was still common in Continental Europe. Machine scutching, while faster and cheaper, causes more waste than scutching by hand. One method of machine scutching is to crush the stalks between two metal rollers so that parts of the stalk can be separated.

A modern scutching machine can process up to 500 kilograms (1,100 lb) of flax every hour, and produces about 70 kg (150 lb) of flax fibers and 30 kg (66 lb) of tow (fibre). Older machines create more waste.

== See also ==
- Cotton gin – Machine that separates cotton from seeds
- Cotton mill – Building producing yarn or cloth from cotton
- Hand processing flax – Industry which produces textiles
- Preparing flax for spinning – Flowering plant in the flax family
- Heckling (flax) – Combing process used to clean and straighten scutched flax or other bast fibers
- Linen production – Textile made from spun flax fibre
