= The Hackler from Grouse Hall =

"The Hackler from Grouse Hall" is a song from the Sliabh Guaire area of Cavan, Ireland, about an overzealous R.I.C. sergeant who pursued an aging hackler with a fondness for Poitín.

== History ==
The song was written in the late 1880s by a local man, Peter Smith, from Stravicnabo, Lavey. (In Colm Ó Lochlainn’s "More Irish Street Ballads" 1965, it is incorrectly attributed as having been written in the 1870s).

An aging hackler, Pat Mac Donnell, "Paddy Jack" was pursued and arrested by a sergeant who had come to Grouse Hall. The hackler may have been Pat Mac Donnell. Hackling, of which Mac Donnell was a roving practitioner, was the final process in preparing flax for spinning into linen. Prior to the industry becoming mechanised and moving to East Ulster it was a rural based cottage industry with Cootehill as Ulster’s largest market.

The sergeant was James Mullervy, born in Derawaley, Drumlish, Longford who joined the R.I.C. (Royal Irish Constabulary) in 1872 and was appointed sergeant in Grouse Hall in 1890. He retired in 1898 and returned to Derawaley where he married, raised a family and where his descendants live today.

The song makes use of the traditional Irish internal rhyme:

Down into hell he’d run pell-mell to hunt for poitín there
And won’t be loath to swear an oath ’twas found in Killinkere.

== Recordings ==
Christy Moore and Planxty, Damien Dempsey, The Mary Wallopers

== Poitin ==
In the 1990s a product known as The Hackler, an Irish Poitín, was developed by Cooley Distillery. So popular was this song that the promotional literature originally referred incorrectly to a hackler as a maker of Poitín. This error was subsequently corrected.

== "The Sergeant's Lamentation" ==
Peter Smith wrote a response in which the sergeant, distracted by hearing "the hills resound with Jemmy from Grouse Hall", vowed to find the "man who wrote the song", and have him before the judge.

Another verse from the Sergeant's Lamentation:

The League ti's true I did pursue/The Priest why should I spare

Who broke the laws and was the cause/Of blood-shed every where

But Martin’s fall in Donegal/Will be avenged ere long

McFadden crew will get there due/Then who will sing this song

This links the song to events at Derrybeg Chapel Gweedore, on Sunday 3 February 1889 in which 42 RIC led by lnspector William Limerick Martin came to arrest Father James Mcfadden.

== "The Calico Landlord" ==
In the period after the Famine, many town shopkeepers bought tracts of countryside and in many cases were as uncaring as the traditional planter landlord. One such, whom he describes as "bloated and bluffed, a boycotted draper, in Ballyjamesduff", is castigated in "The Calico Landlord".

== "Petie’s Cat" ==
Finally, in "Petie’s Cat", he regales the foibles of some neighbours who allow a row over a cat to make it to a court hearing in Ballyjamesduff.
