= Poitín =

Traditional Irish distilled beverage

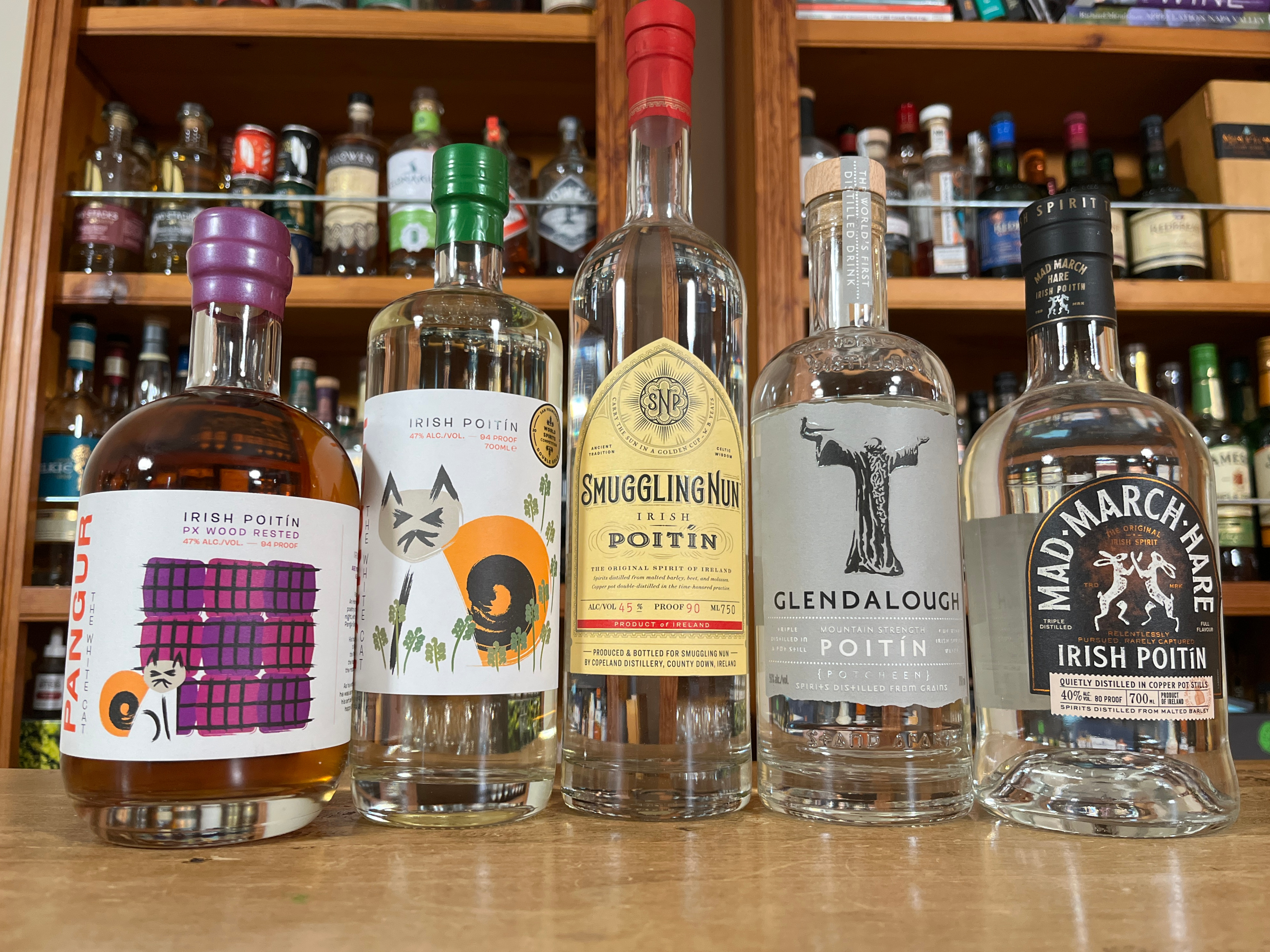
- Bottles of legally produced poitín
- Type: Distilled beverage
- Origin: Ireland
- Alcohol by volume: variable, 40–90%
- Proof (US): variable, 80°–180°
- Colour: Generally colourless with "rested" versions taking on some cask colour
- Flavour: burning, grainy, oily, toffee
- Ingredients: oats, barley both malted and unmalted, wheat, yeast, water (optional: whey, sugar beet, molasses, sugar, potatoes)
- Related products: potato vodka, Irish whiskey

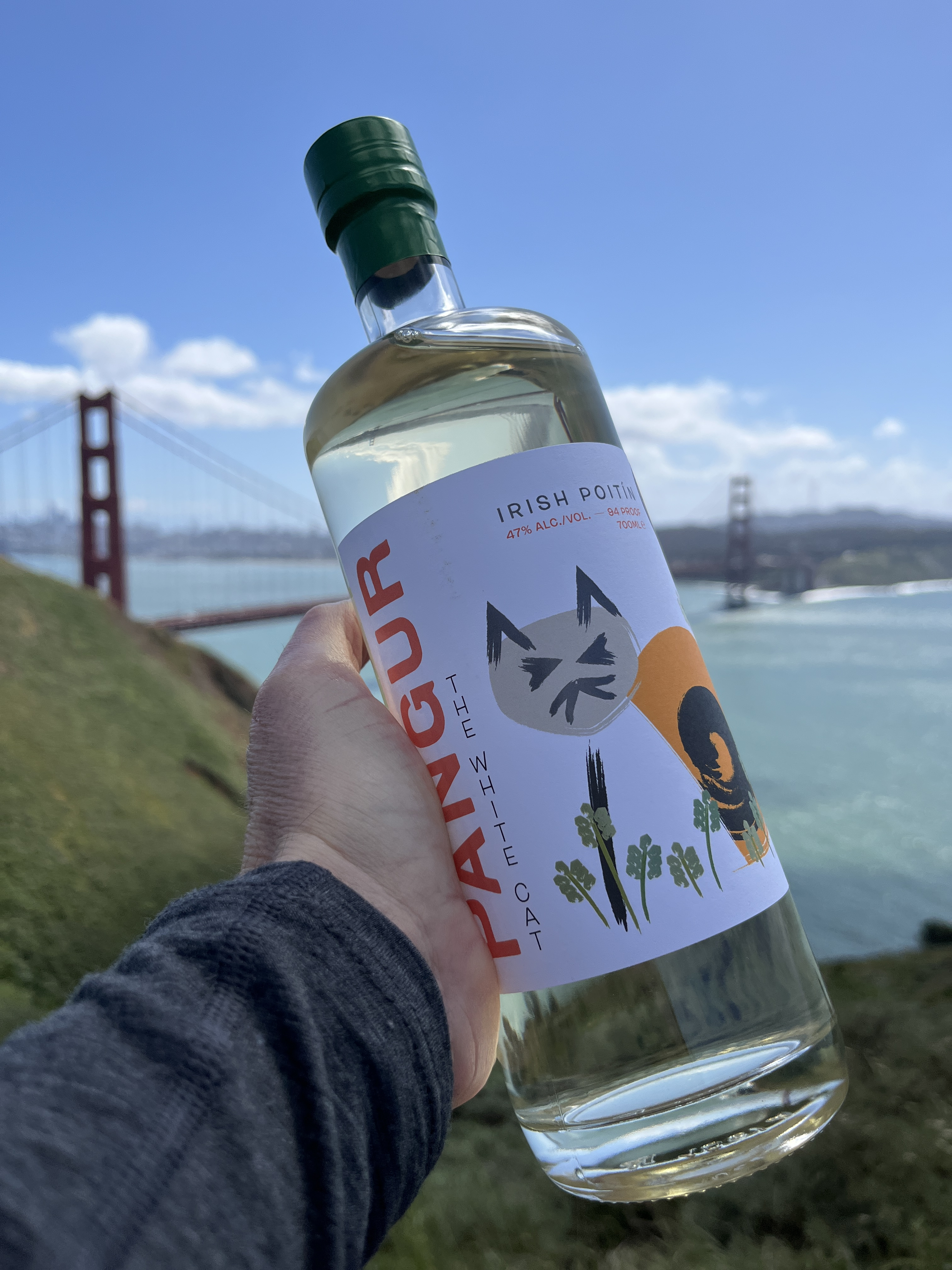
Killowen Pangur Irish Poitín pictured overlooking the Golden Gate Bridge, having been awarded Double Gold at the 2023 San Francisco World Spirits Competition.

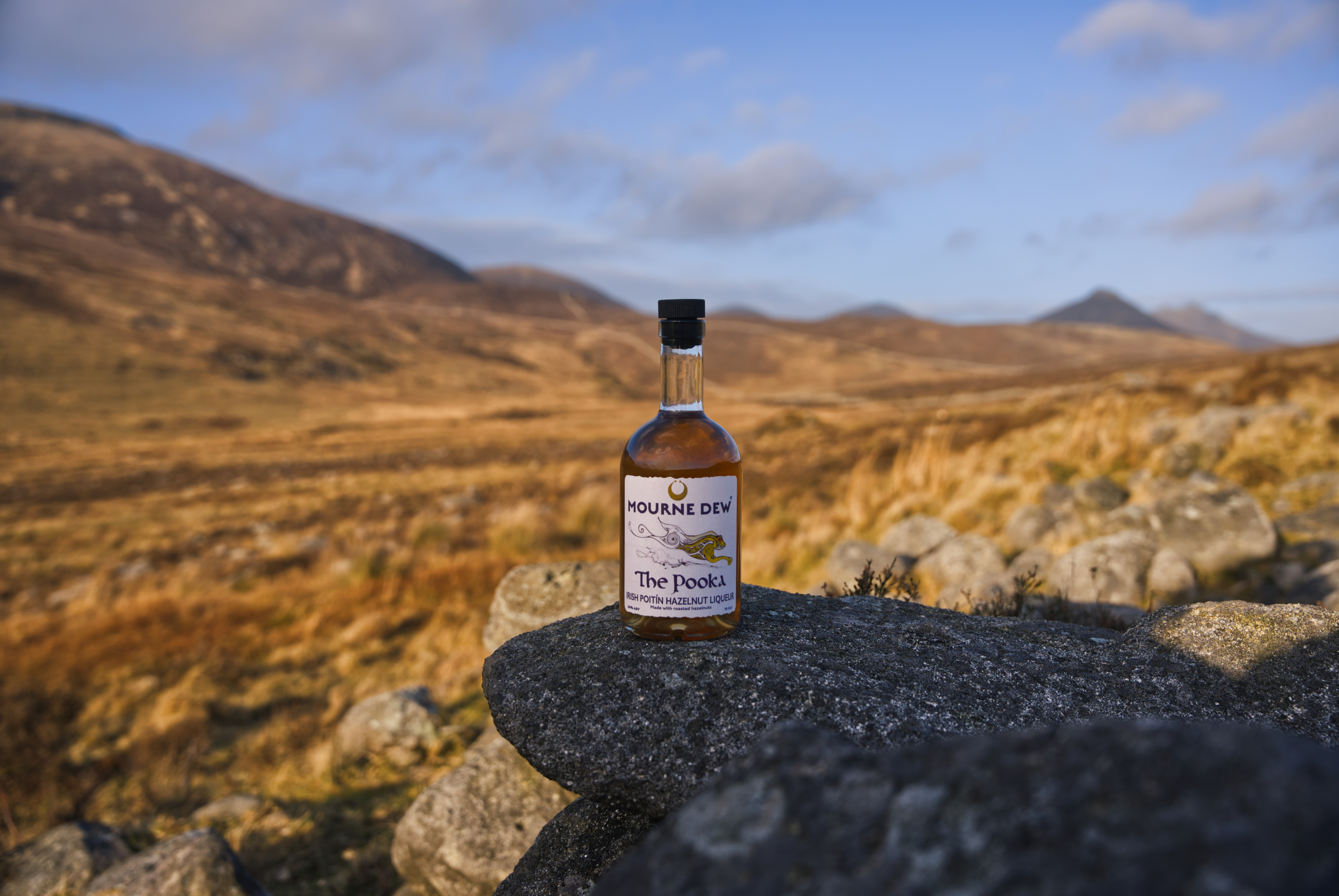
Pooka Hazelnut Irish Poitín Liqueur Awarded 'Irish Drink Award' by Irish Food Writers Guild 2025

Poitín (Irish pronunciation: [ˈpˠʊtʲiːnʲ]), anglicized as poteen (/pəˈt(ʃ)iːn, pɒˈtiːn/) or potcheen, is a traditional Irish distilled beverage (40–90% ABV). It was traditionally distilled in a small pot still, and the term is a diminutive of the Irish word pota, meaning 'pot'. In accordance with the Irish Poteen/Irish Poitín technical file, it can be made only from cereals, grain, whey, sugar beet, molasses and potatoes.

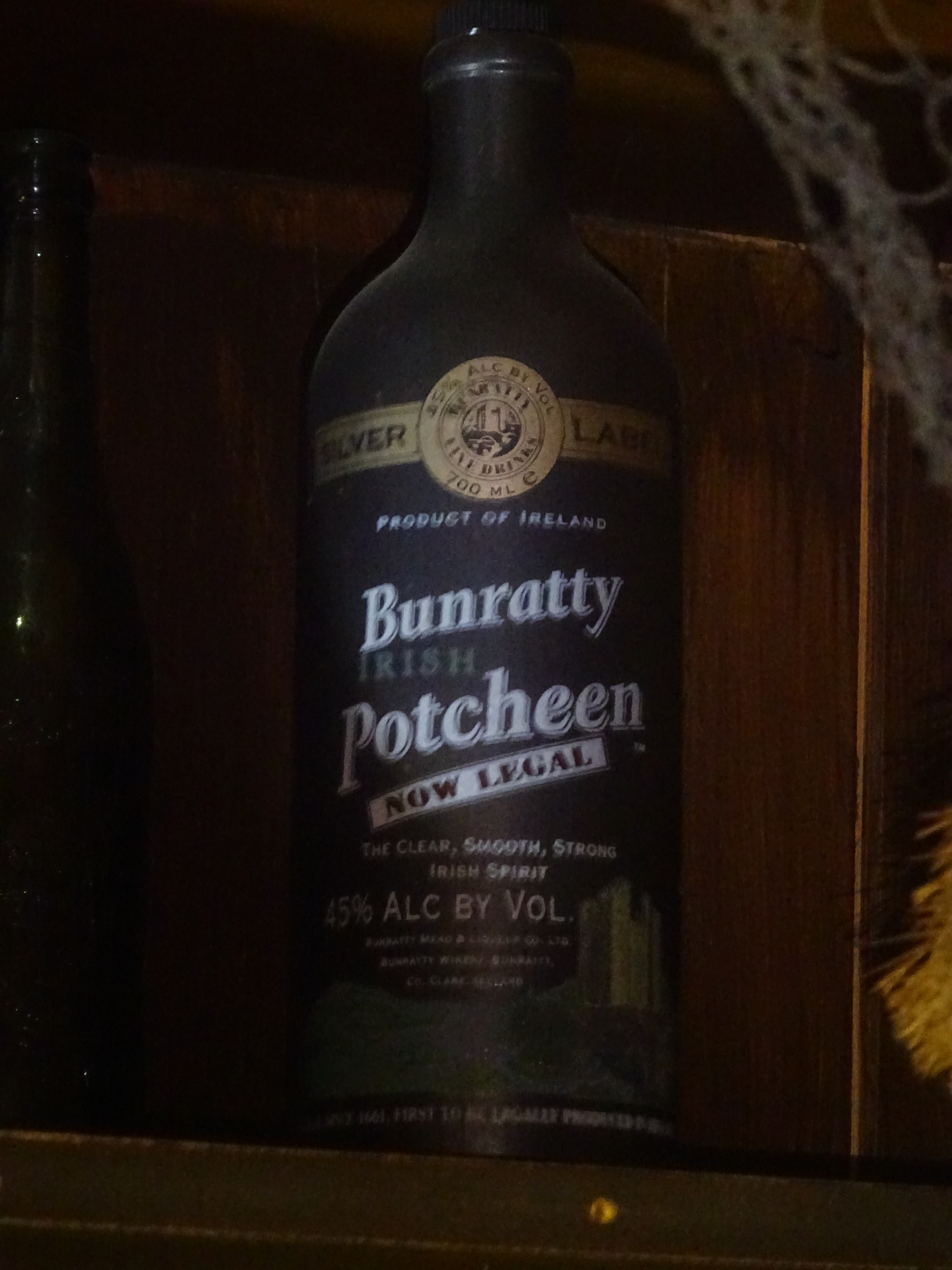
Legal poitín.

== Legal status ==
At the parliament at Drogheda in 1556, a requirement for a licence to distill spirits was introduced.

Poitín was also produced in the growing Irish diaspora in the 19th century, particularly in any of the New York City neighbourhoods dubbed "Irishtown".

Today in Ireland, there are a number of commercially produced spirits labelled as poitín, poteen, or potcheen. In 2008, Irish poitín was accorded (GI) Geographical Indicative Status by the EU Council and Parliament.

In 2015, in consultation with producers and stakeholders, the Irish Government adopted the Geographical Indication technical file for poitín, outlining the production methods that must be used in order for a spirit to be called Irish Poitín. Topics covered included allowable base materials, distillation method, use of flavourings/infusions, and limited storage in casks.

However, the notion of "legal poitín" has been viewed as an oxymoron by some; true poitín is illegal and cannot be legally sold.

== Production ==
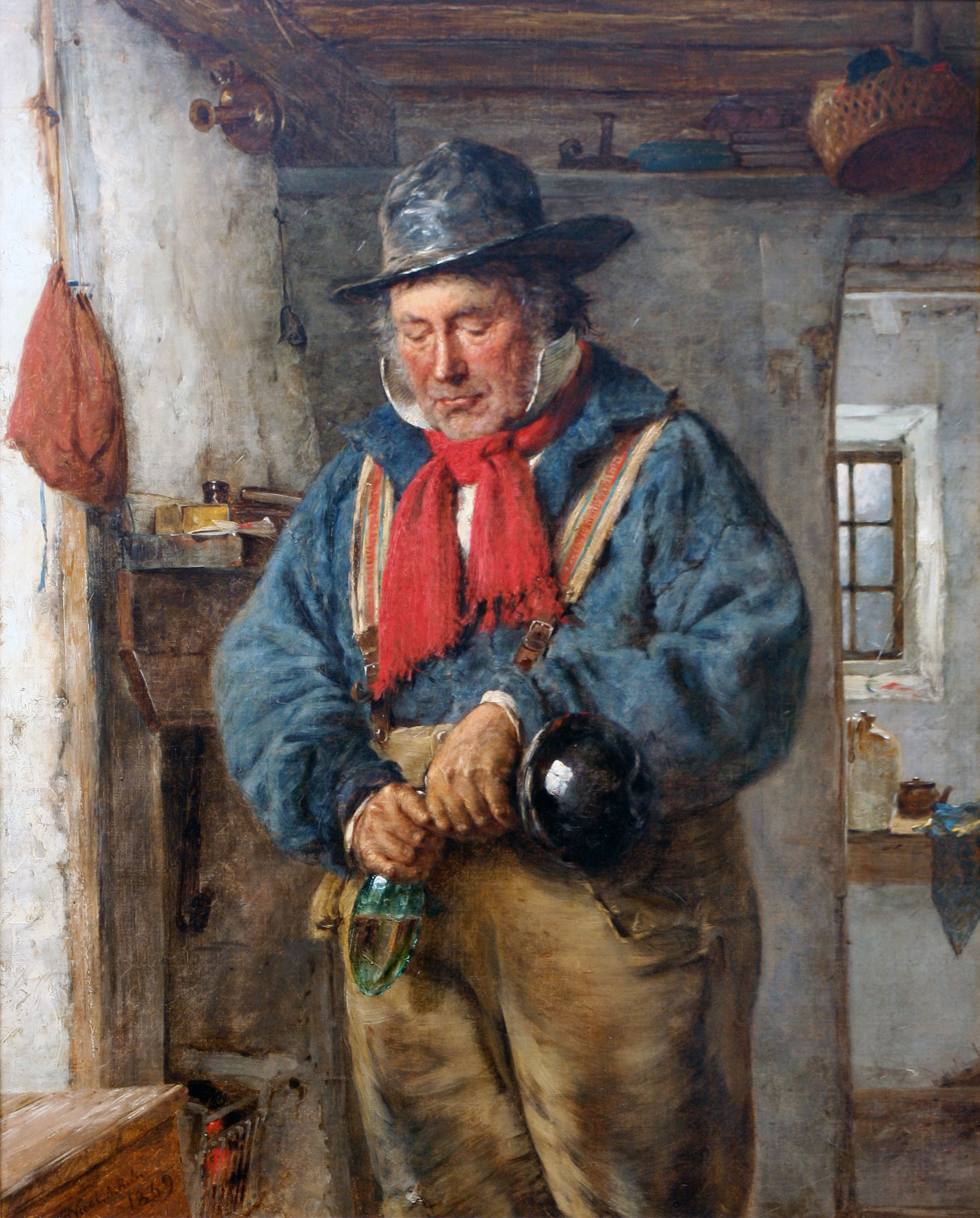
Erskine Nicol, A Nip Against the Cold, 1869.

Poitín was generally produced in remote rural areas, away from the interference of the law. A mash was created and fermented before the distillation began. Stills were often set up on land boundaries so that the issue of ownership could be disputed. Before the introduction of bottled gas, the fire to heat the mash was provided by turf. Smoke was a giveaway for the police, so windy, broken weather was chosen to disperse the smoke. The still was heated and attended to for several days to allow the runs to go through.

The old style of poitín distilling was from a malted barley base for the mash, the same as single malt whiskey or pure pot still whiskey distilled in Ireland. The word poitín stems from the Irish word pota for 'pot'; this refers to the small copper pot still used by poitín distillers.

Because poitín was covertly home-distilled for centuries, there is no formal recipe for it.

In more recent times, some distillers deviated from using malted barley as a base of the mash bill due to the cost and availability, instead switching to using treacle, corn, and potatoes. It is believed this switch led to the deteriorating quality and character of poitín in the late 20th century.

The quality of poitín was highly variable, depending on the skill of the distiller and the quality of their equipment. Reputations were built on the quality of the distiller's poitín, and many families became known for their distilling expertise, whereas a bad batch could put a distiller out of business overnight. It has been claimed that the drink can cause blindness, which can be due to methanol adulteration.

== Annual Poitín event ==
Poitín is celebrated at an annual event, Poitín Now, in Dublin each year.

== Literature, film and traditional music ==
Poitín is a trope in Irish poetry and prose of the nineteenth century. The Irish critic Sinéad Sturgeon has demonstrated how the illegality of the substance became a crucial theme running through the writings of Maria Edgeworth and William Carleton. Many characters in the work of contemporary Irish playwright Martin McDonagh consume or refer to poitín, most notably the brothers in The Lonesome West. In the Saga of Darren Shan book The Lake of Souls, the character Spits Abrams brews his own poitín. In Frank McCourt's book 'Tis, he recalls his mother, Angela, telling him that when his brother Malachy visited her in Limerick, he obtained poitín in the countryside and drank it with her.

Some traditional Irish folk songs, such as The Hills of Connemara and The Rare Old Mountain Dew, deal with the subject of poitín. The folk song "Tinkers' Potcheen" by Seamus Moore recounts the way in which the practice of producing poitín is passed down through families. The persecution of the poitín maker by the Royal Irish Constabulary in 1880s Cavan is treated in The Hackler from Grouse Hall and its reply, The Sergent's Lamentation. In the first song, an overzealous sergeant pursued an aging hackler with a fondness for poitín.

The 1959 film Darby O'Gill and the Little People features Darby splitting a jug of poitín with the King of the leprechauns as the two engage in a drinking game.

Poitín was the titular subject matter of the 1978 film Poitín, which was the first feature film entirely in Irish.

== See also ==
- Irish whiskey
- Moonshine
- Pure pot still whiskey
