= Freilichtmuseum Roscheider Hof =

Folk and open-air museum in Rhineland-Palatinate, Germany

Coordinates: 49°42′17″N 6°35′50″E

Roscheider Hof Open Air Museum
- Volkskunde- und Freilichtmuseum Roscheider Hof
- Established: 1976
- Location: Konz, Rhineland-Palatinate, Germany
- Type: Folk museum, open air museum
- Visitors: 70,000
- Director: Helge Klaus Rieder
- Website: roscheiderhof.de

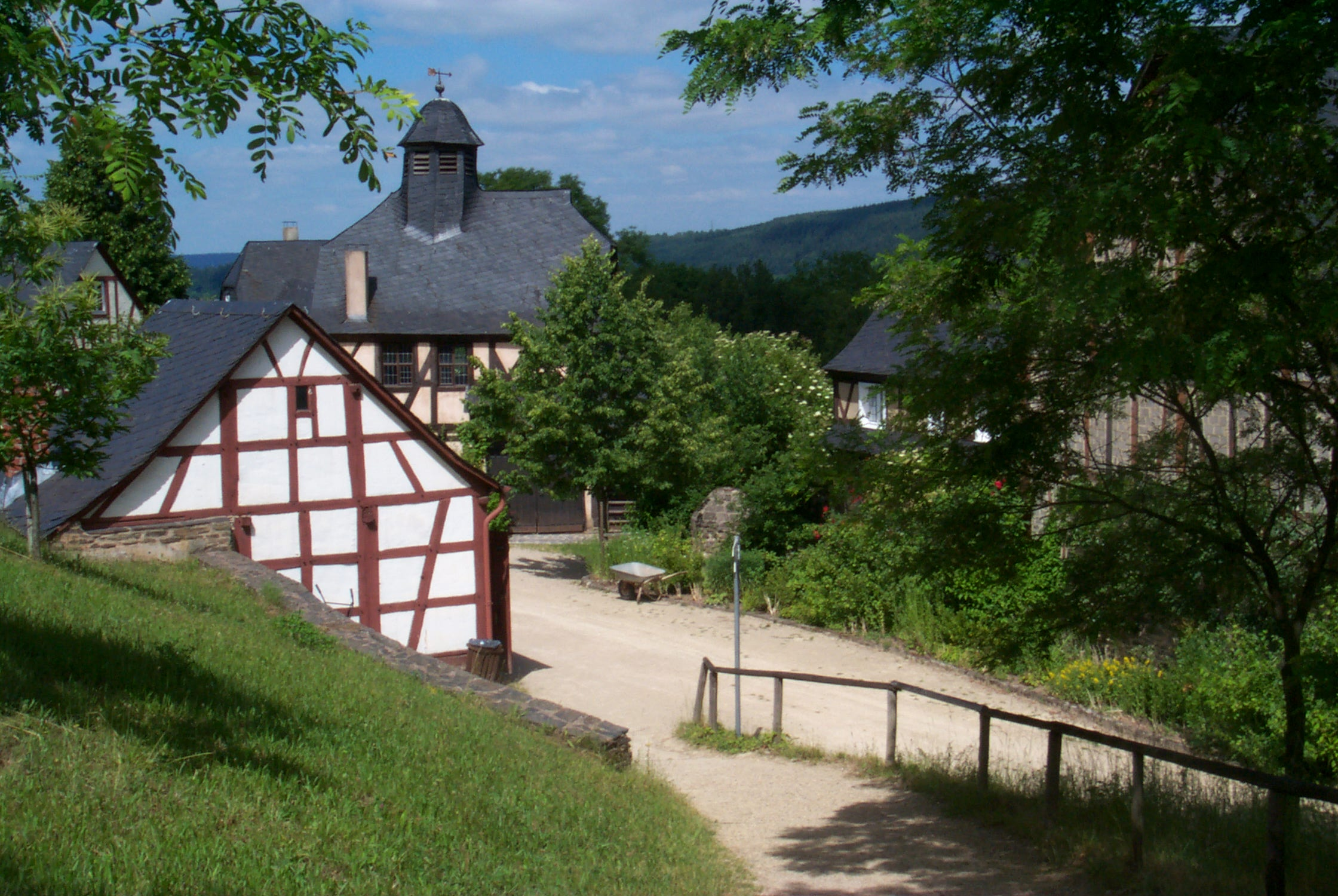
Hunsrück village

The Freilichtmuseum Roscheider Hof is an open-air museum and folklore museum in the Greater SaarLorLux Region. The museum is situated in Konz, Germany, on the Saar and Mosel rivers, 8 km west of Trier and 30 km east of Luxembourg. It is a museum for rural cultural history in northwest Rhineland-Palatinate and the German-Luxembourg-Lorraine border region. Unlike many other open-air museums, the Roscheider Hof is not a public or community institution. The sponsoring organisation for the museum since its foundation has been the registered, non-profit association founded in 1973, "Volkskunde- und Freilichtmuseum Roscheider Hof, Konz e.V." with over 1000 members in 2007. The museum is financed by membership fees, entrance charges, subsidies and donations. The founder of the association was Prof. Rolf Robischon.

== Attractions ==
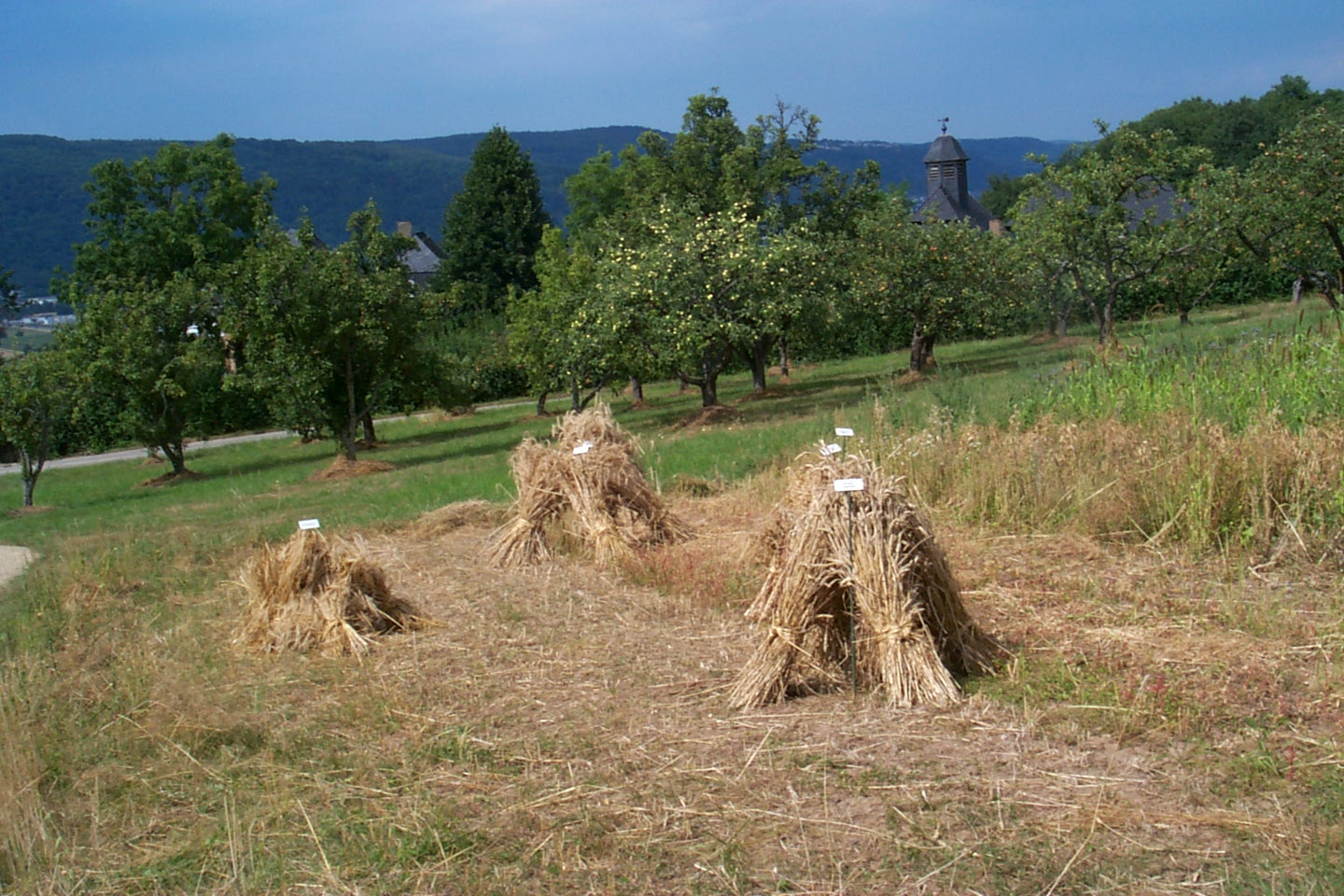
The Green Path, museum meadows and orchards

- 4000 m^{2} of folklore exhibitions ranging from winegrowing to dentistry in the historical exhibition building and, since autumn of 2006, in the newly built museum of forestry and wood,
- a tin figure and toy museum,
- 22 ha of open grounds with the Hunsrück village, a Moselle village that is currently being reconstructed, a rose garden, several country gardens,
- a restaurant with beer garden and a large nature-oriented children's playground,
- activity days, special exhibitions, the legendary Christmas market on 2 weekends in Advent
- guided tours, projects for museum visitors both young and old, children's birthday parties, etc.

== History of the Roscheider Hof ==
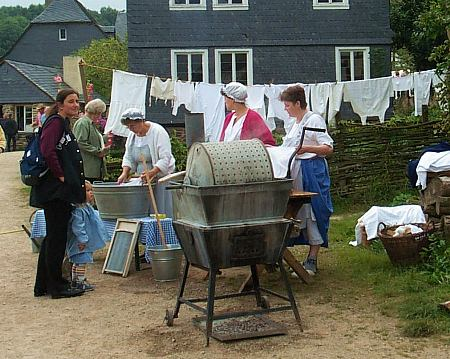
Farmers' and craftsmen's day

The "Roscheider Hof" estate is used today as an open-air museum. It consists of several buildings, with the core of the site formed by buildings around a rectangular courtyard. The Roscheider Hof was first mentioned in a record dating from 1330. During the 1978 renovations a few parts of a building came to light that could be dated to the early 16th century. For instance, there is a small walled window with late Gothic splays. Until the French Revolution in 1794 (when revolutionary troops conquered the Trier region), it was an agricultural estate owned by the St. Matthias Benedictine monastery, which still exists today. As part of the secularisation of these years, the estate was auctioned off in 1805 to the credit of the French state and acquired by Nicholas Valdenaire, who had come to the nearby town of Saarburg as a French soldier in 1801 and married there. Valdenaire extended the estate and enlarged the Roscheider Hof buildings with extensive renovations. He and his son Victor played a prominent role in the 1848 revolution: they were deputies in the provincial parliament, in the state parliament, in the Prussian national assembly in Berlin and in the first German parliament in the Paulskirche in Frankfurt, and were even imprisoned several times for such activities.

== Sources ==
- Bernd Blumenthal, Herrmann Kramp: Der Roscheider Hof - Benediktinerabtei, Bauernschule, Freilichtmuseum, Ein Beitrag zur 25-Jahr-Feier des Museums, 1998, ISBN 3-9802025-9-3;
- Museumsführer des Freilichtmuseum Roscheider Hof, Konz (guidebook)

== Gallery ==
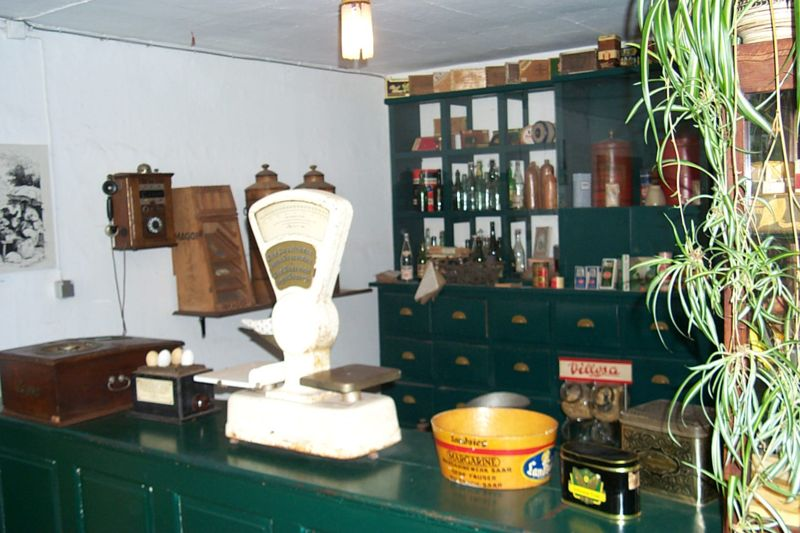

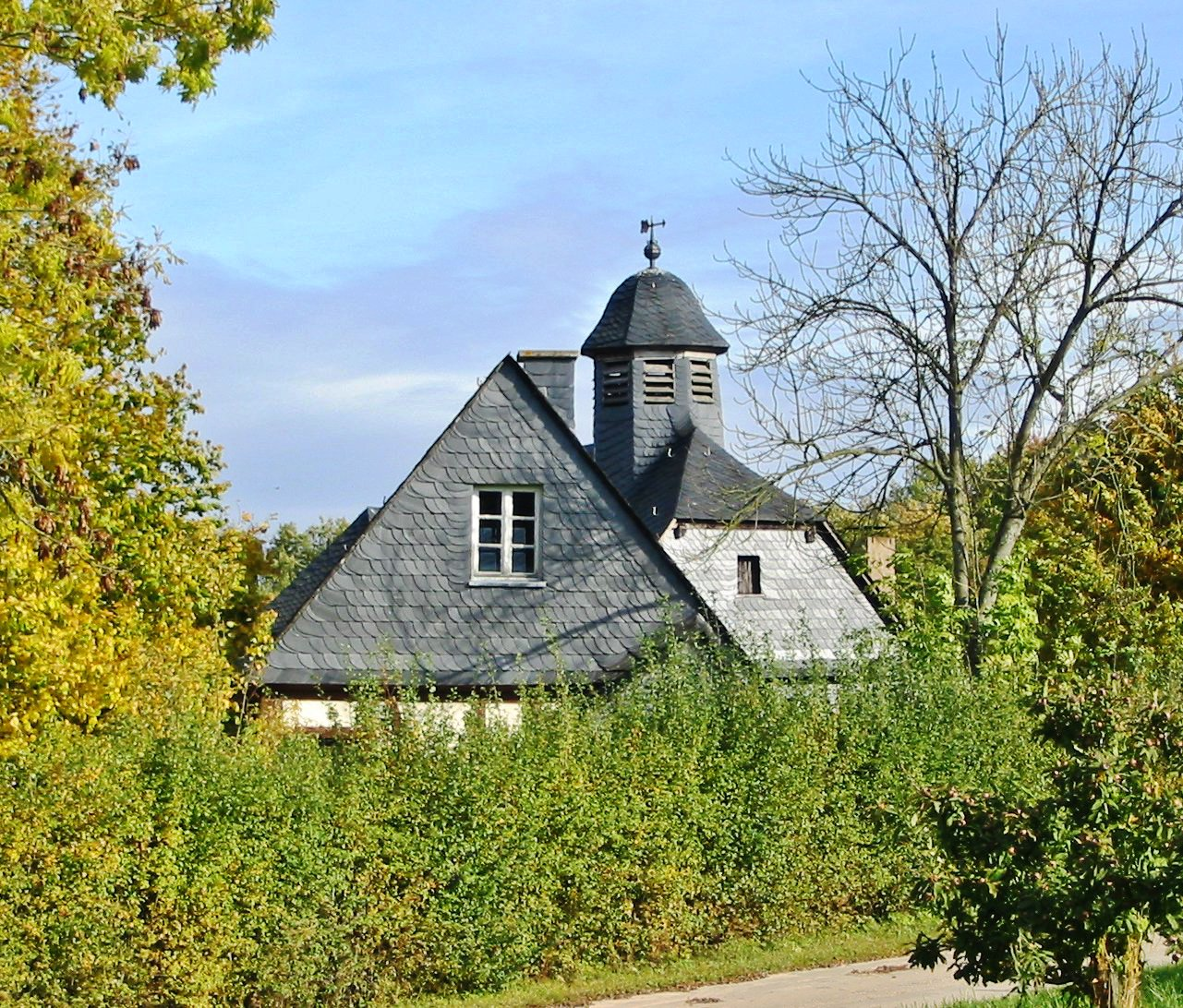

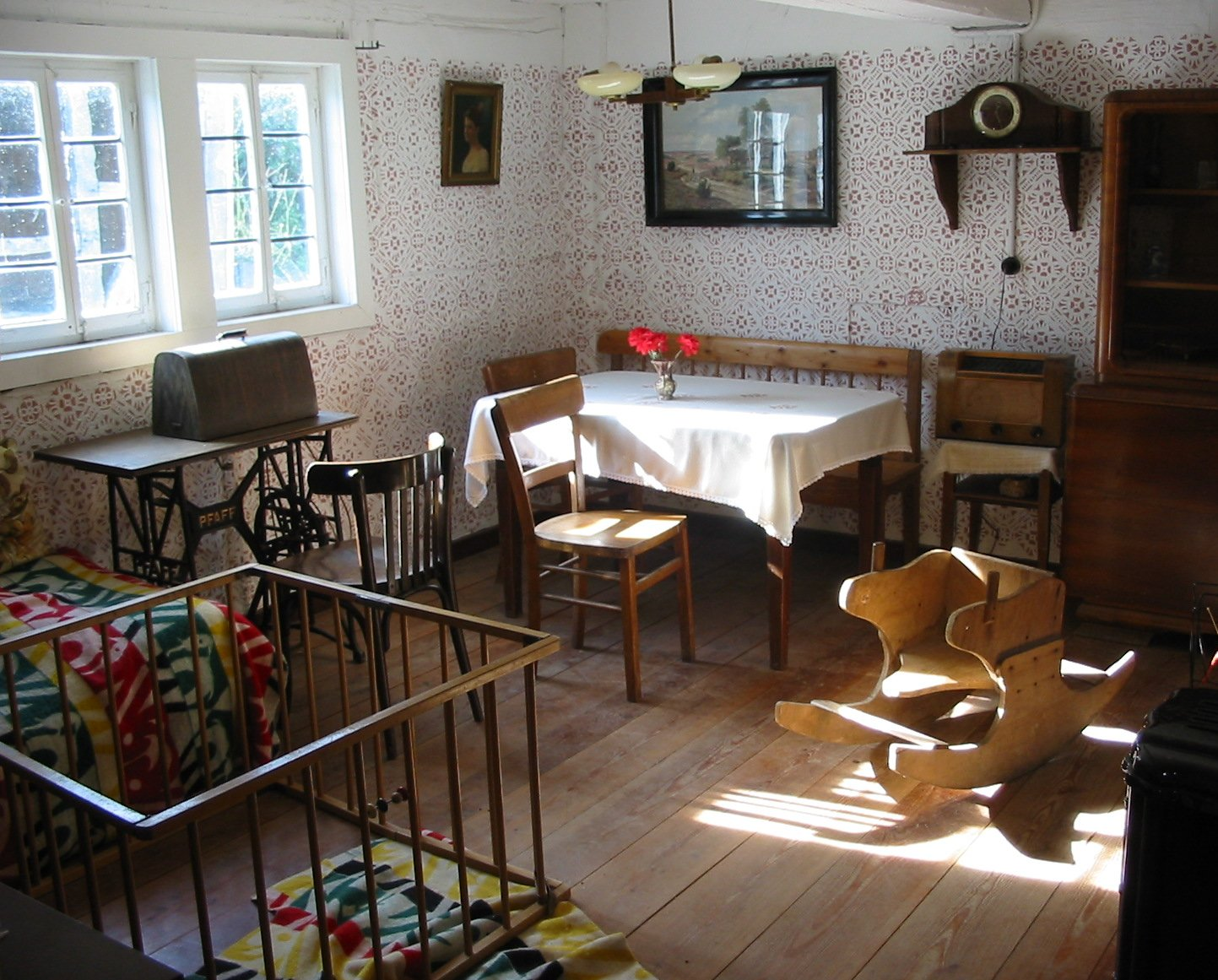

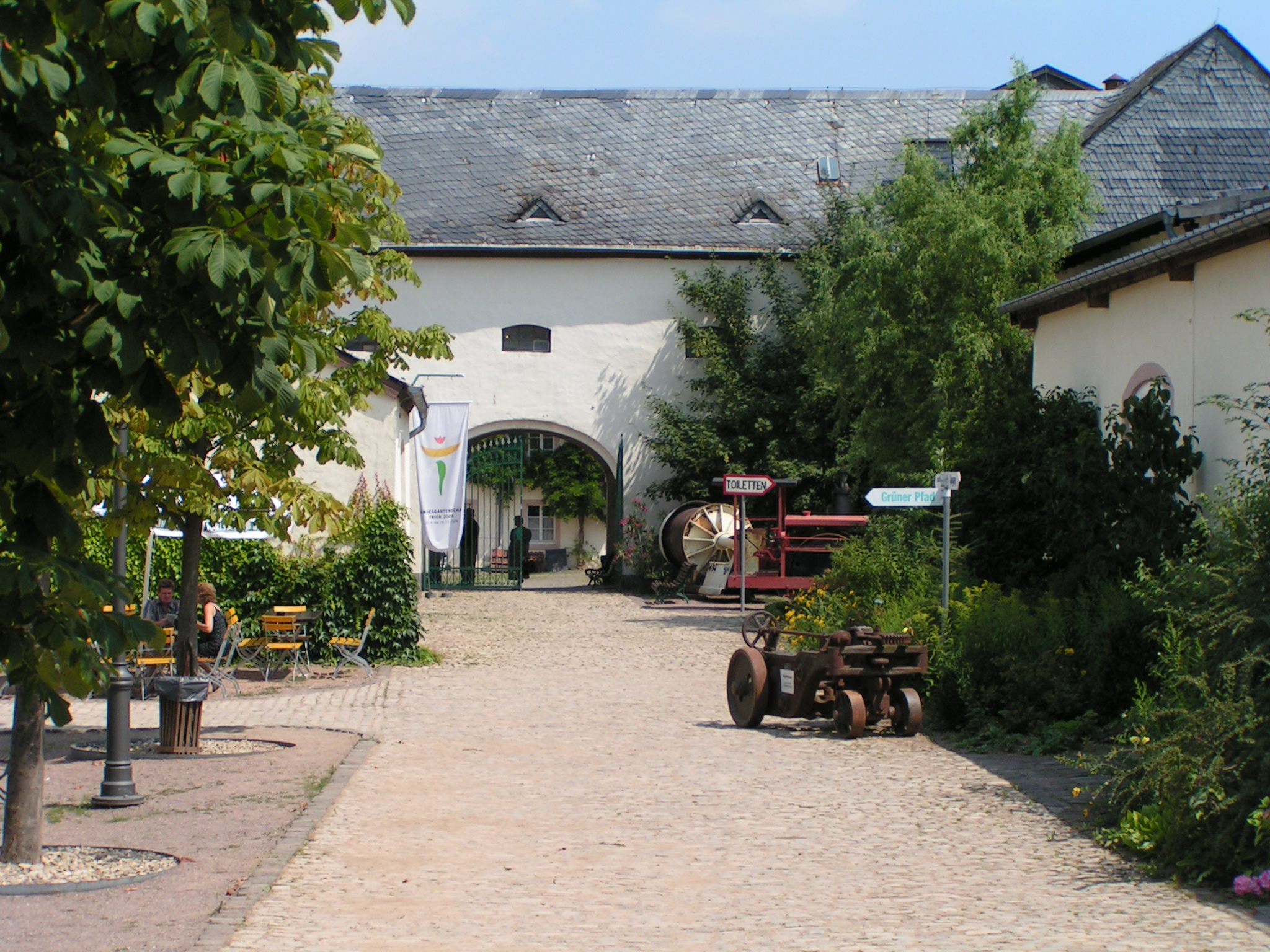

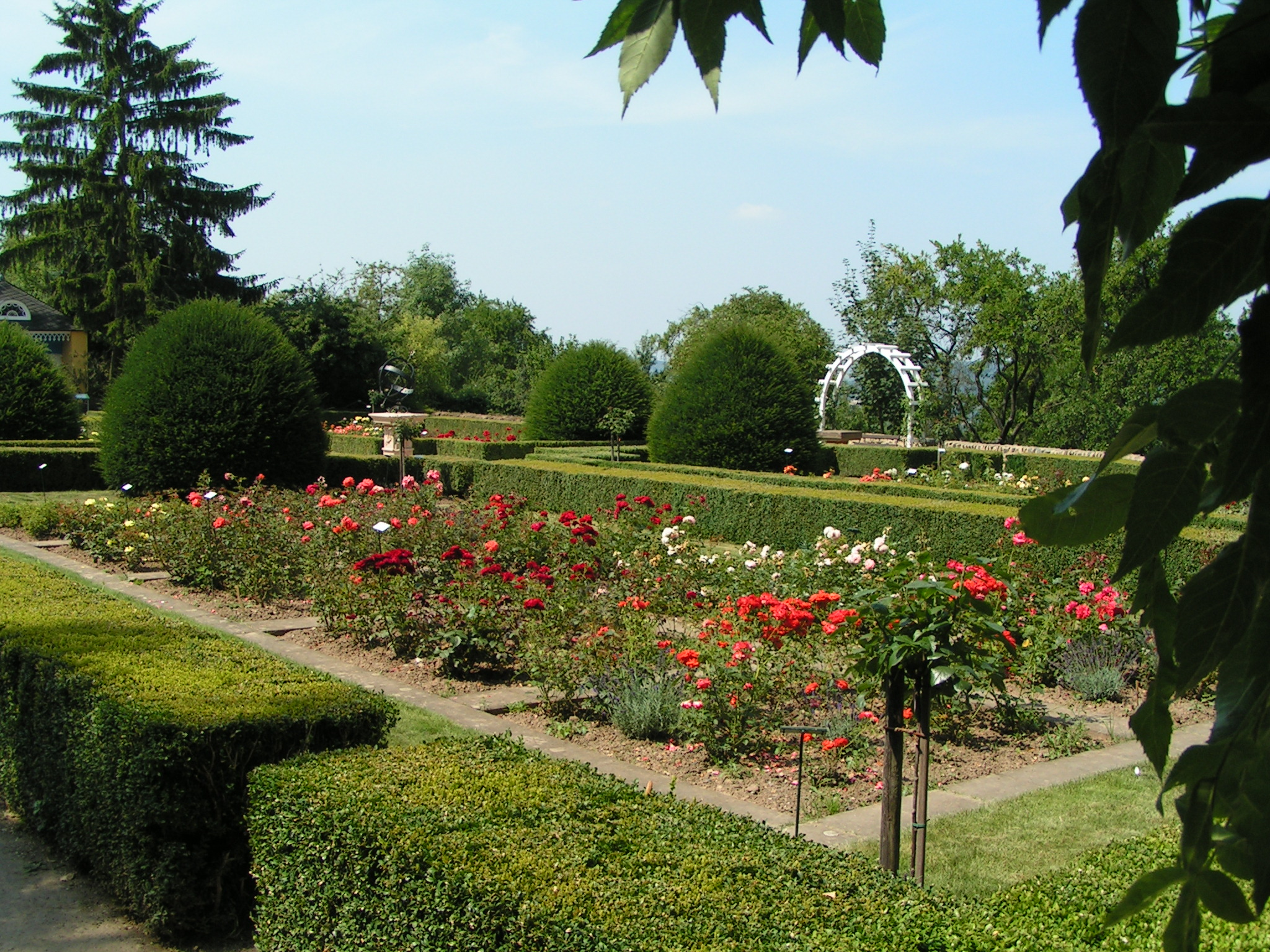

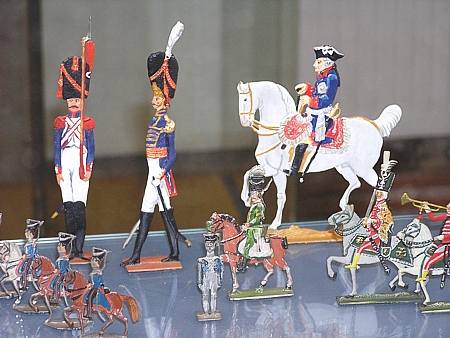

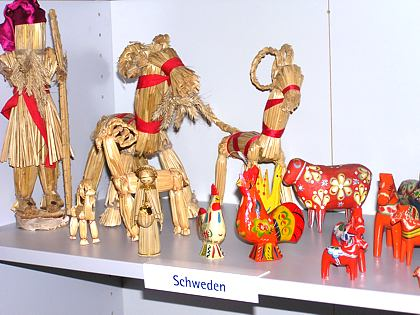

== Videos ==
Wine pressing day at the museum in 2006

The Irreler peasant tradition's historical methods of doing laundry by hand at the museum in 2008
