= Hand spinning =

Method of turning fiber into thread

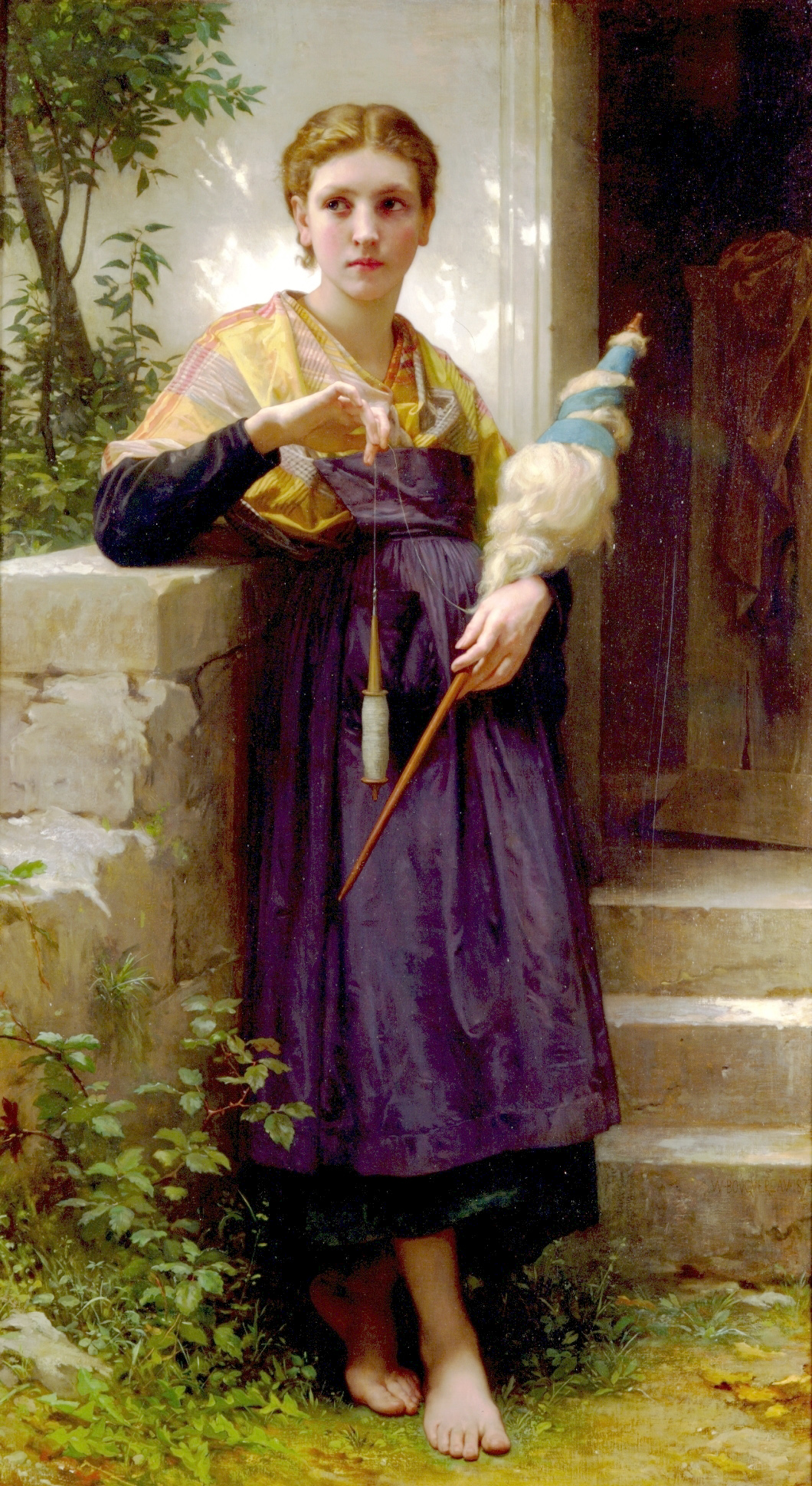
The Spinner by William-Adolphe Bouguereau shows a woman hand-spinning using a drop spindle. Fibers to be spun are bound to a distaff held in her left hand.

Spinning is an ancient textile art in which plant, animal or synthetic fibres are drawn out and twisted together to form yarn. For thousands of years, fibre was spun by hand using simple tools, the spindle and distaff. After the introduction of the spinning wheel in the 13th century, the output of individual spinners increased dramatically. Mass production later arose in the 18th century with the beginnings of the Industrial Revolution. Hand-spinning remains a popular handicraft.

Characteristics of spun yarn vary according to the material used, fibre length and alignment, quantity of fibre used, and degree of twist.

== History ==
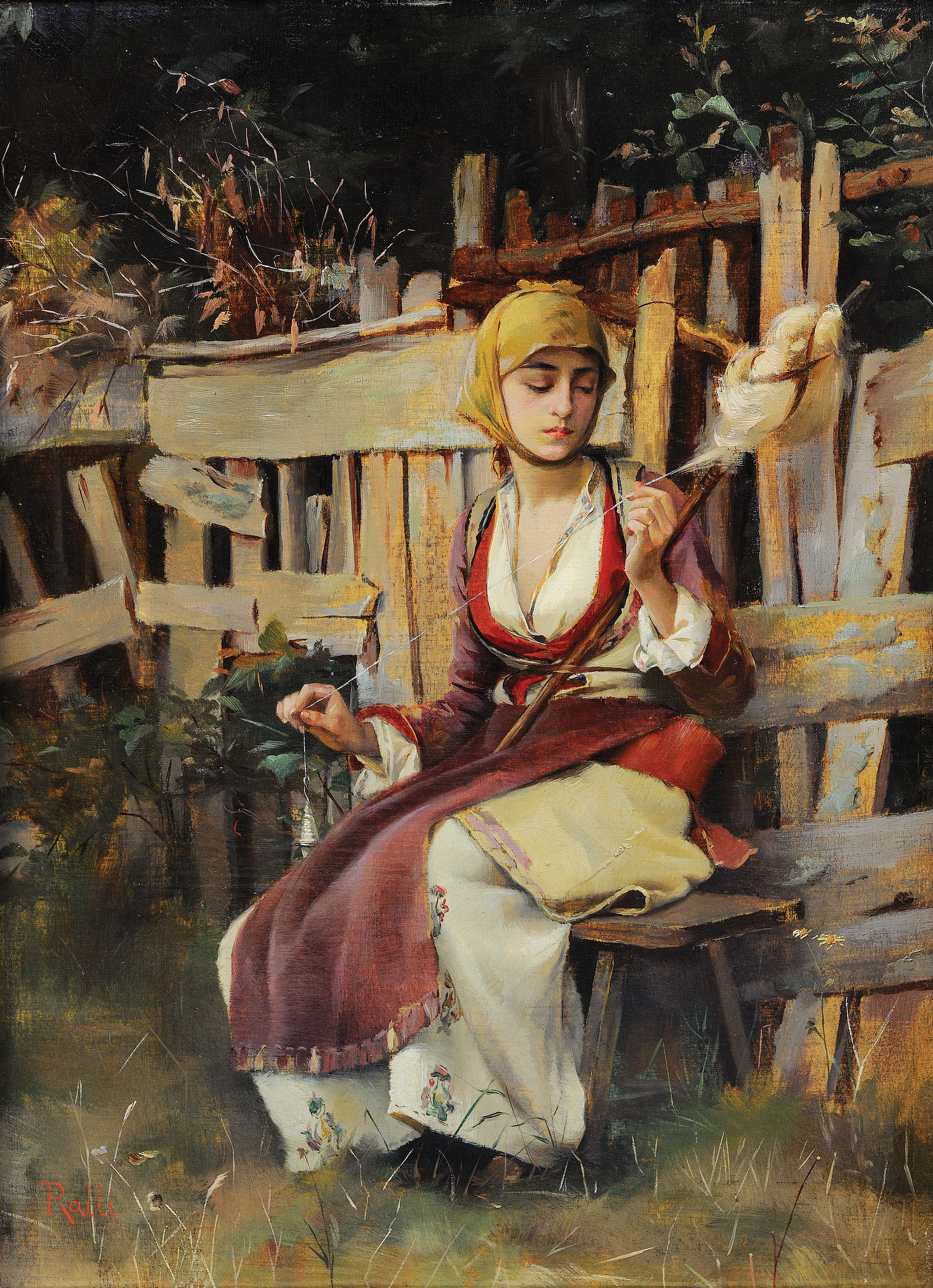
Woman Spinning by Théodore Jacques Ralli c. 1890, shows a Greek woman hand spinning in a small village.

The origins of spinning fibre to make string or yarn are lost in time, but archaeological evidence in the form of representation of string skirts has been dated to the Upper Paleolithic era some 20,000 years ago. In 2020, it there was a discovery of plied cord spun by Neanderthals and dating back 41,000-52,000 years. In the earliest type of spinning, tufts of animal hair or plant fibre are rolled down the thigh with the hand, and additional tufts are added as needed until the desired length of spun fibre is achieved. An advanced technique of thigh-spinning while simultaneously plying two singles is still used today in several cultures, such as with Chilkat weaving and Ravenstail weaving. In earlier practice of thigh-spinning, the fibre might be fastened to a stone which is twirled round until the yarn is sufficiently twisted, whereupon it is wound upon the stone and the process repeated over and over.

The next method of spinning yarn is with the spindle, a straight stick eight to twelve inches long on which the yarn is wound after twisting. At first the stick had a cleft or split in the top in which the thread was fixed. Later, a hook of bone was added to the upper end. The bunch of wool or plant fibres is held in the left hand. With the right hand the fibres are drawn out several inches and the end fastened securely in the slit or hook on the top of the spindle. A whirling motion is given to the spindle on the thigh or any convenient part of the body. The twisted yarn is then wound on to the upper part of the spindle. Another bunch of fibres is drawn out, the spindle is given another twirl, the yarn is wound on the spindle, and so on.

The distaff was used for holding the bunch of wool, flax, or other fibres. It was a short stick, on one end of which was loosely wound the raw material. The other end of the distaff was held in the hand, under the arm or thrust in the girdle of the spinner. When held thus, one hand was left free for drawing out the fibres.

A spindle containing a quantity of yarn rotates more easily, steadily, and continues longer than an empty one; hence, the next improvement was the addition of a weight called a spindle whorl at the bottom of the spindle. These whorls are discs of wood, stone, clay, or metal with a hole in the centre for the spindle, which keep the spindle steady and promote its rotation. Spindle whorls appeared in the Neolithic era. They allowed the spinner to slowly lower, or drop, the spindle as it was spinning, thus allowing a greater quantity of yarn to be made before it had to be wound onto the spindle, hence the name "drop spindle," which is now most commonly used for the hand spindle with whorl attached. The Scottish drop spindle is called fairsaid, farsadh, or dealgan.

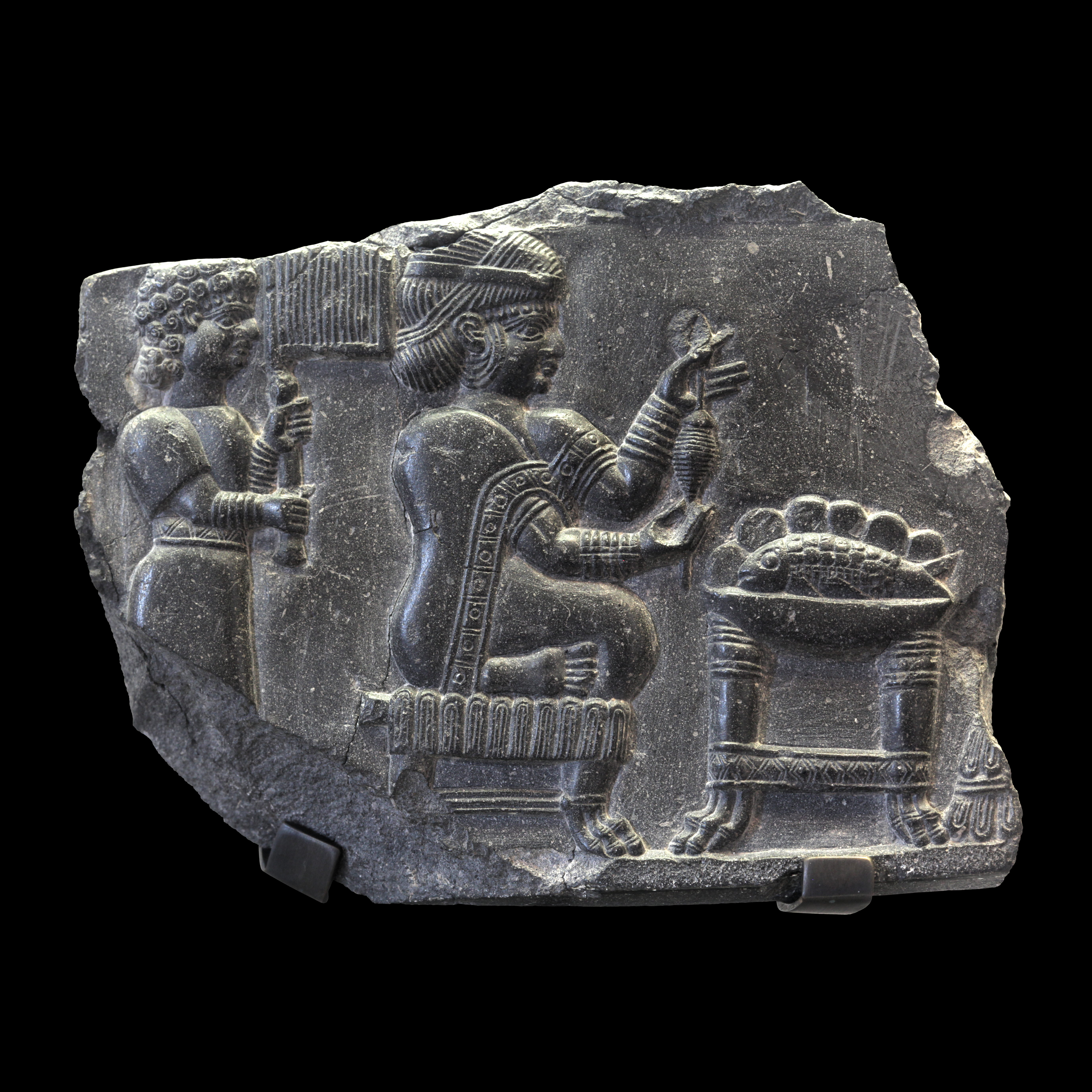
Woman spinning, fanned by attendant with whole fish on table, 700–550 BC from Neo-Elamite period in Susa

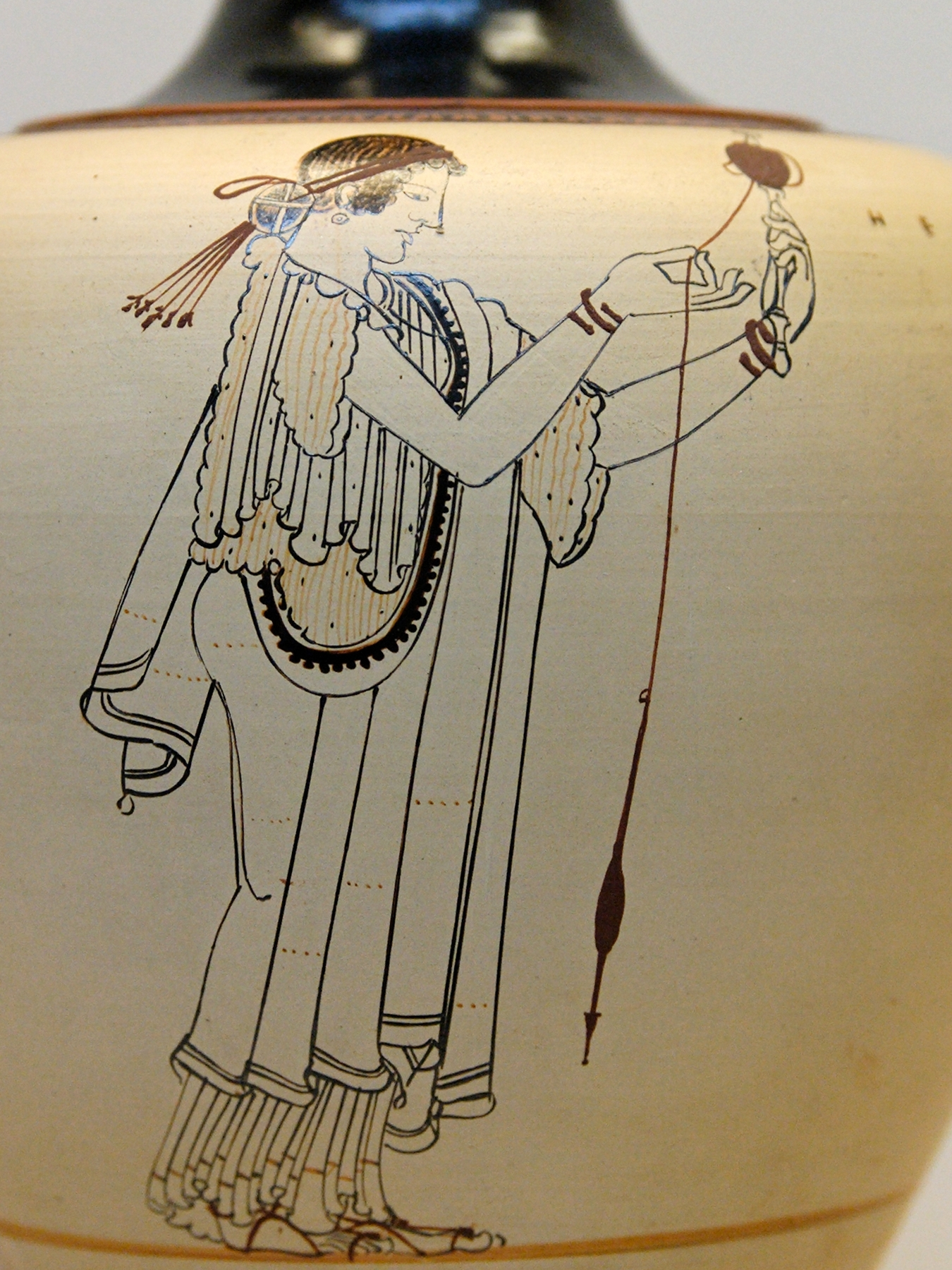
Woman spinning. Detail from an Ancient Greek attic white-ground oinochoe, ca. 490 BC, from Locri, Italy. British Museum, London.

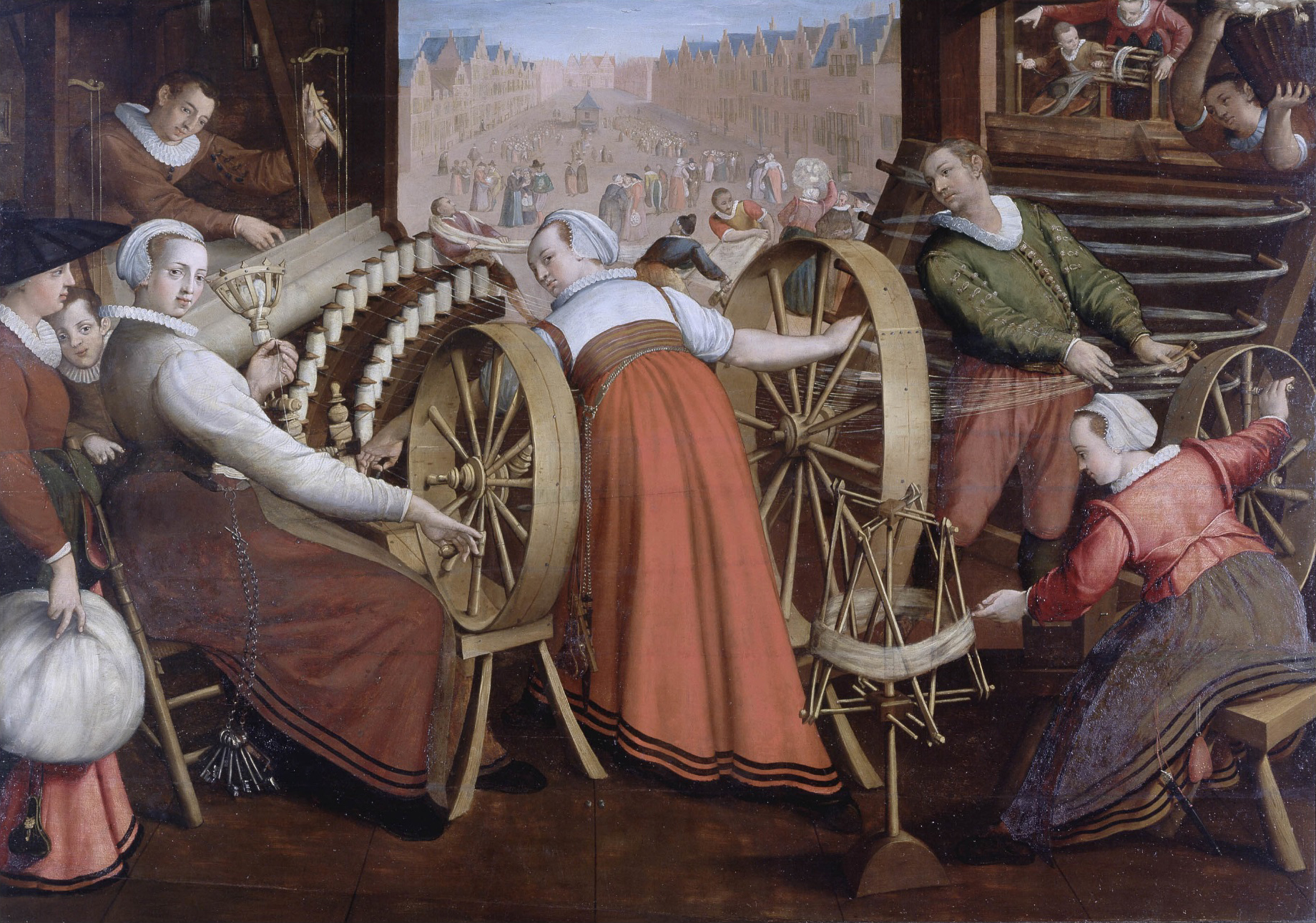
1595 painting illustrating Leiden textile workers

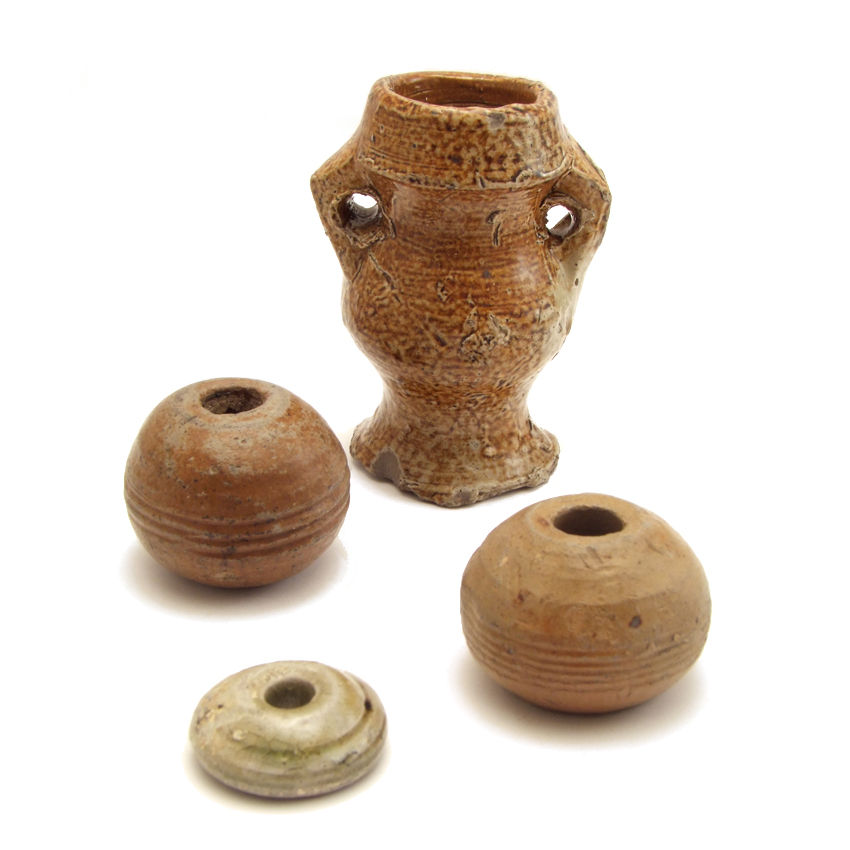
Medieval spinning jug which contained water or grease to use during the spinning process and 3 Medieval spindle whorls.

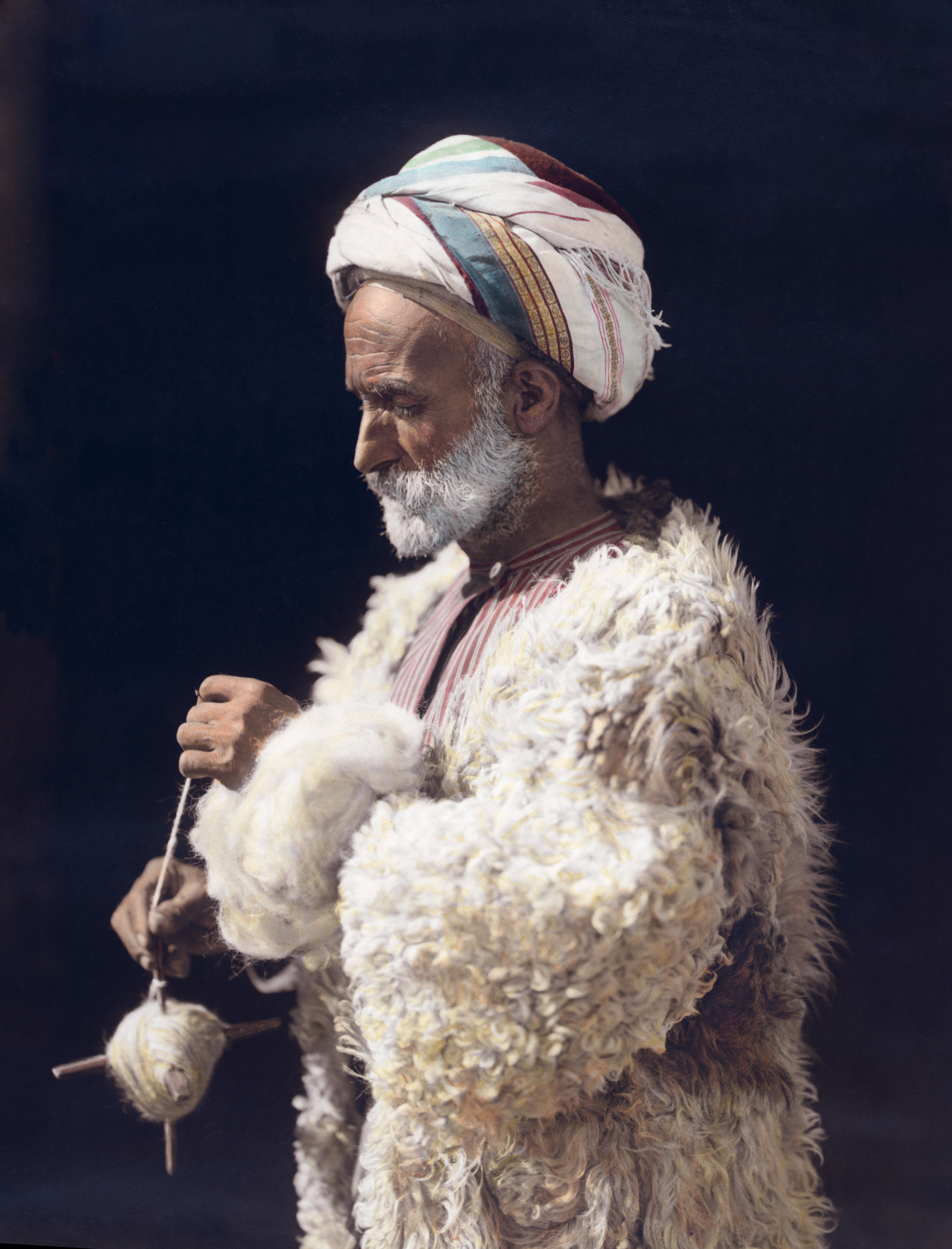
A man from Ramallah spinning wool. Hand-tinted photograph from 1919, restored.

=== Spinning wheel ===
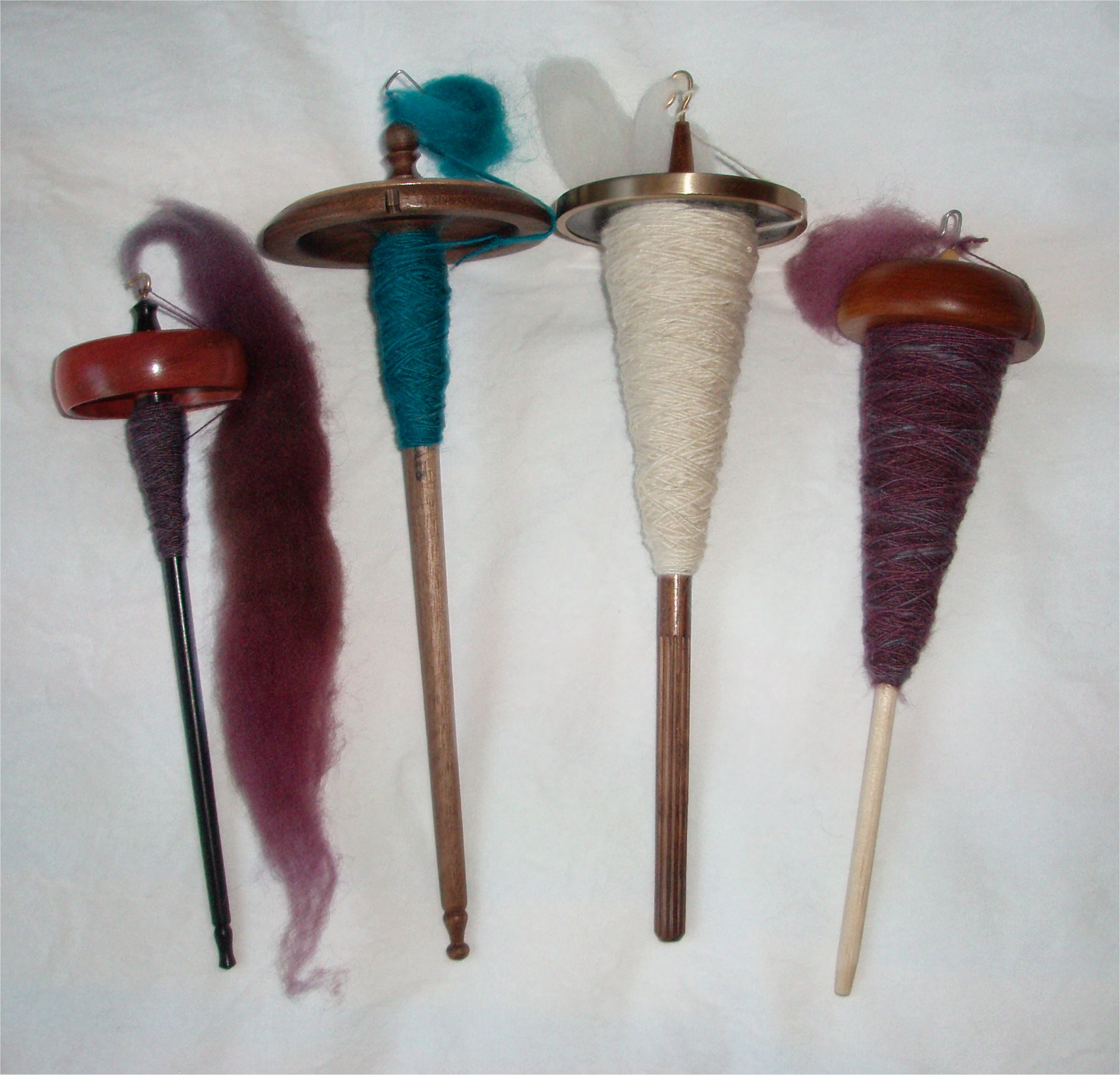
Modern top-whorl drop spindles

The spinning wheel was possibly invented in the Islamic world by 1030. It later spread to China by 1090, and then spread from the Islamic world to Europe and India by the 13th century.

In medieval times, poor families had such a need for yarn to make their own cloth and clothes that practically all girls and unmarried women would keep busy spinning, and "spinster" became synonymous with an unmarried woman. Subsequent improvements with spinning wheels and then mechanical methods made hand-spinning increasingly uneconomic, but as late as the twentieth century hand-spinning remained widespread in poor countries: in conscious rejection of international industrialization, Gandhi was a notable practitioner. The hand spinning movement that he initiated as a part of the Indian freedom struggle has made the handwoven cloth known as "Khadi" made from handspun cotton yarn world-famous. Women spinners of cotton yarn still continue to work to produce handspun yarn for the weaving of Khadi in Ponduru, a village in South India.

A great wheel (also called a wool wheel, high wheel or walking wheel) is advantageous when using the long-draw technique to spin wool or cotton because the high ratio between the large wheel and the whorl (sheave) enables the spinner to turn the bobbin faster, thus significantly speeding up production.

Saxony wheels (also called a flax wheel) or upright wheels (also called a castle wheel) were introced into Europe in the 16th century. A Saxony wheel is invaluable when spinning flax to make linen. The ends of flax fibres tend to stick out from the thread unless wetted while being spun, so the spinner usually keeps a bowl of water handy when spinning flax. On these types of wheels both hands are free as the wheel is turned with a treadle rather than by hand, so the spinner can use one hand to draft the fibres and the other to wet them. These wheels can also be used to spin wool or cotton.

=== Industrial Revolution ===
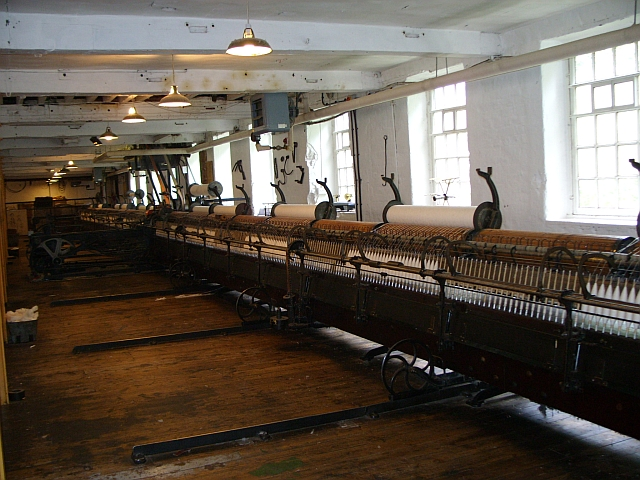
A mule spinning machine at Quarry Bank Mill, UK

Powered spinning, originally done by water or steam power but now done by electricity, is vastly faster than hand-spinning.

The spinning jenny, a multi-spool spinning wheel invented c. 1764 by James Hargreaves, dramatically reduced the amount of work needed to produce yarn of high consistency, with a single worker able to work eight or more spools at once. At roughly the same time, Richard Arkwright and a team of craftsmen developed the spinning frame, which produced a stronger thread than the spinning jenny. Too large to be operated by hand, a spinning frame powered by a waterwheel became the water frame.

In 1779, Samuel Crompton combined elements of the spinning jenny and water frame to create the spinning mule. This produced a stronger thread, and was suitable for mechanisation on a grand scale. A later development, from 1828/29, was Ring spinning.

In the 20th century, new techniques including Open End spinning or rotor spinning were invented to produce yarns at rates in excess of 40 meters per second.

== Characteristics of spun yarns ==
=== Materials ===
Yarn can be, and is, spun from a wide variety of materials, including natural fibres such as animal, plant, and mineral fibres, and synthetic fibres.

=== Twist and ply ===
S-twist and Z-twist yarns

The direction in which the yarn is spun is called twist. Yarns are characterized as S-twist or Z-twist according to the direction of spinning (see diagram). Tightness of twist is measured in TPI (twists per inch or turns per inch).

Two or more spun yarns may be twisted together or plied to form a thicker yarn. Generally, handspun single plies are spun with a Z-twist, and plying is done with an S-twist. This is a cultural preference differing in some areas but surprisingly common. It is important, however, to spin the single plies in one direction and then spin them together in the opposite direction—in this way, the opposite-direction plying keeps the spun yarn from untwisting itself.

=== Plying methods ===
Yarns can be made of two, three, four, or more plies, or may be used as singles without plying. Two-ply yarn can also be plied from both ends of one long strand of singles using a centre-pull ball, where one end feeds from within a ball of yarn while the other end feeds from the outside. "Andean plying", in which the single is first wound around one hand in a specific manner that allows unwinding both ends at once without tangling, is another way to ply smaller amounts of yarn. The name comes from a method used by Andean spinners to manage and splice unevenly matched singles being plied from multiple spindles. "Navajo plying", a.k.a. "chain-plying" is another method of producing a three-ply yarn, in which one strand of singles is looped around itself in a manner similar to crochet and the resulting three parallel strands twisted together. This method is often used to keep colours together on singles dyed in sequential colours. Cabled yarns are usually four-ply yarns made by plying two strands of two-ply yarn together in the direction opposite to the plying direction for the two-ply yarns.

== Contemporary hand spinning ==
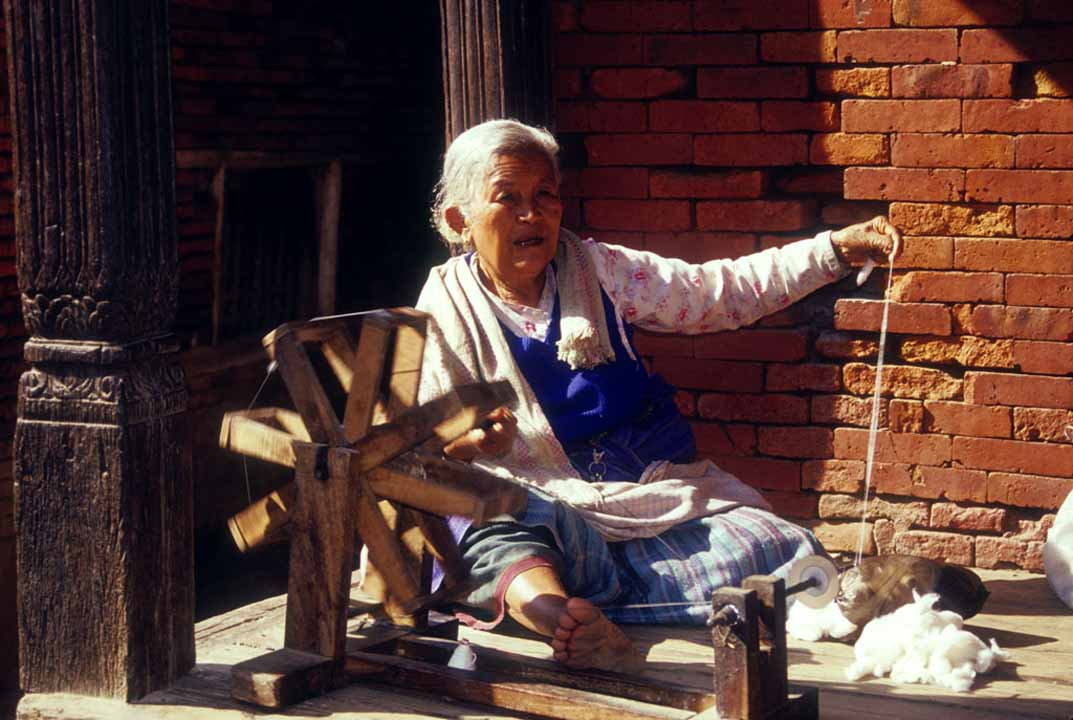
A Nepali charka in action

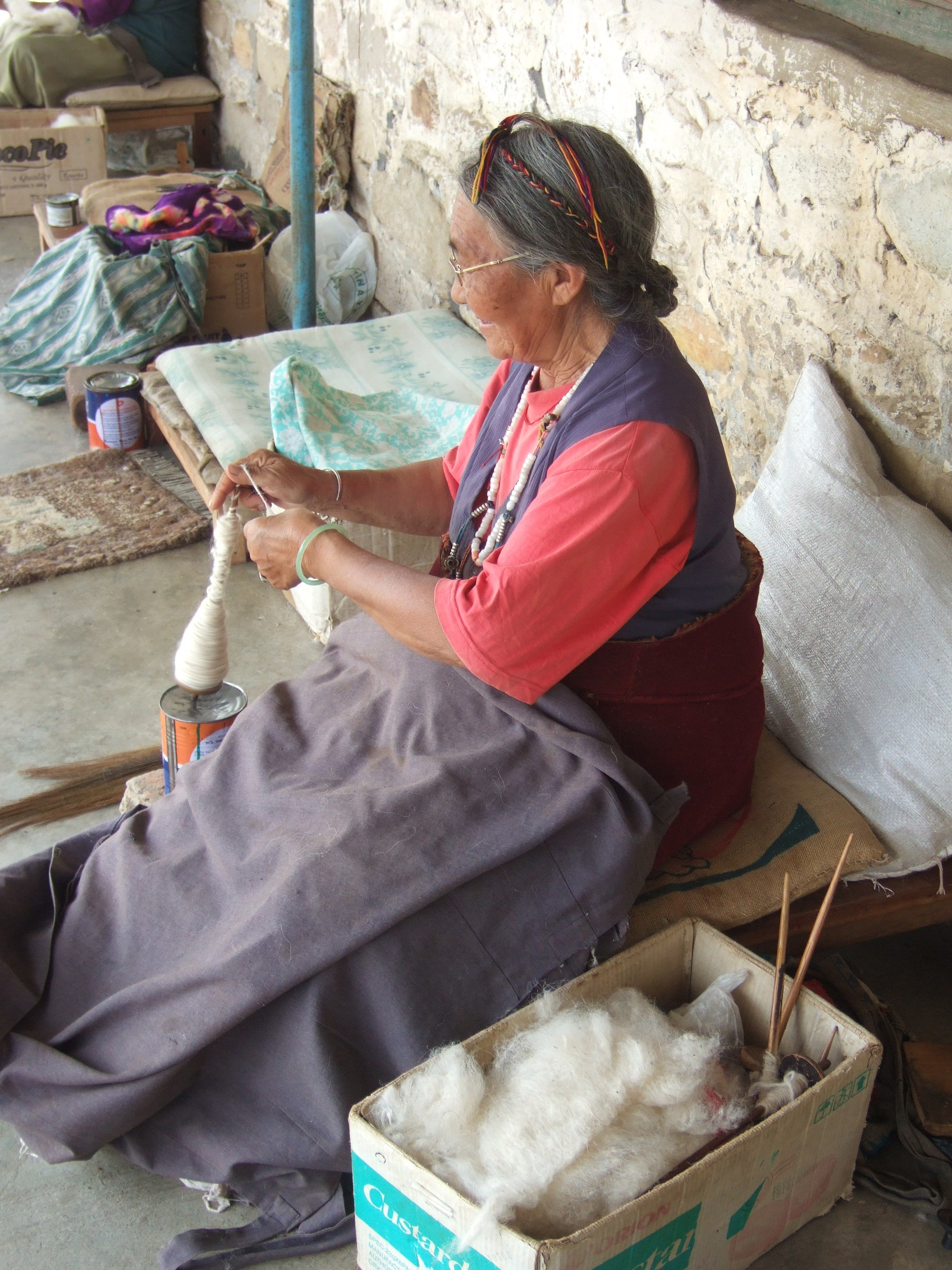
A Tibetan woman spinning wool in Pokhara/Nepal

Hand-spinning is still an important skill in many traditional societies. Hobby or small scale artisan spinners spin their own yarn to control specific yarn qualities and produce yarn that is not widely available commercially. Sometimes these yarns are made available to non-spinners online and in local yarn stores. Handspinners also may spin for self-sufficiency, a sense of accomplishment, or a sense of connection to history and the land. In addition, they may take up spinning for its meditative qualities.

In the recent past, many new spinners have joined into this ancient process, innovating the craft and creating new techniques. From using new dyeing methods before spinning, to mixing in novelty elements (Christmas Garland, eccentric beads, money, etc.) that would not normally be found in traditional yarns, to creating and employing new techniques like coiling, this craft is constantly evolving and shifting.

To make various yarns, besides adding novelty elements, spinners can vary all the same things as in a machined yarn, i.e., the fibre, the preparation, the colour, the spinning technique, the direction of the twist, etc. A common misconception is that yarn spun from rolags may not be as strong, but the strength of a yarn is actually based on the length of hair fibre and the degree of twist. When working with shorter hairs, such as from llama or angora rabbit, the spinner may choose to integrate longer fibres, such as mohair, to prevent yarn breakage. Yarns made of shorter fibres are also given more twist than yarns of longer fibres, and are generally spun with the short draw technique.

The fibre can be dyed at any time, but is often dyed before carding or after the yarn has been spun.

Wool may be spun before or after washing, although excessive amounts of lanolin may make spinning difficult, especially when using a drop-spindle. Careless washing may cause felting. When done prior to spinning, this often leads to unusable wool fibre. In washing wool the key thing to avoid is too much agitation and fast temperature changes from hot to cold. Generally, washing is done lock by lock in warm water with dish-soap.

=== Education ===
There are number of guilds and educational institutions which offer certificate programs in handspinning. The Handweavers Guild of America (HGA) offers a Certificate of Excellence in Handspinning. Olds College in Alberta, Canada offers a Master Spinner program both on campus and by distance education. The Ontario Handweavers & Spinners offer both a Spinning Certificate and a Master Spinning Certificate. These programs feature in-depth examinations of handspinning topics, as well as extensive assignments and skill evaluations.

=== Techniques ===
- Watch video #1: Demonstration of hand spinning:

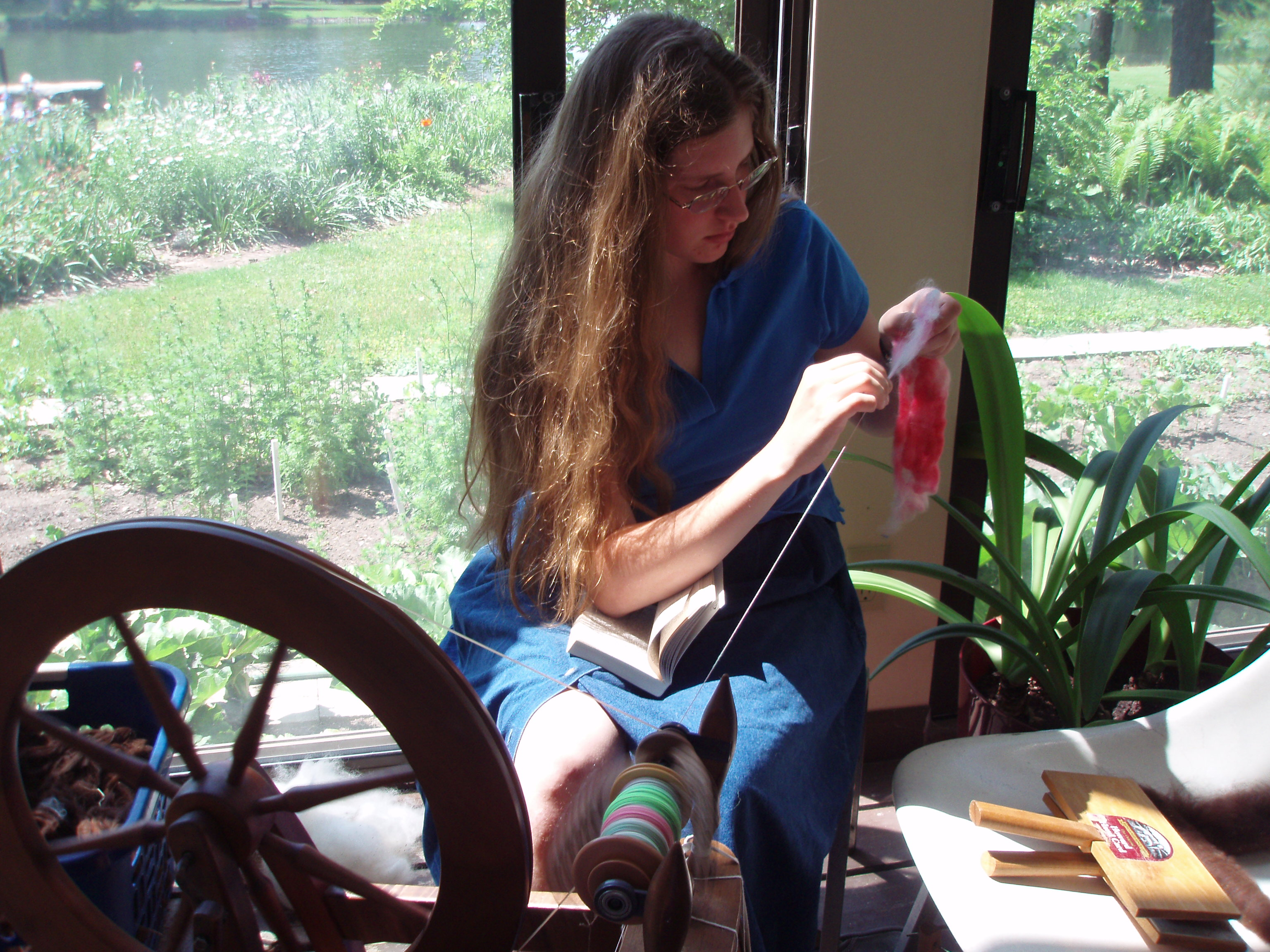
A handspinner using the short draw technique to spin wool on a Saxony wheel

A tightly spun wool yarn made from fibre with a long staple length in it is called worsted. It is hand spun from combed top, and the fibres all lie in the same direction as the yarn. A woollen yarn, in contrast, is hand spun from a rolag or other carded fibre (roving, batts), where the fibres are not as strictly aligned to the yarn created. The woollen yarn, thus, captures much more air, and makes for a softer and generally bulkier yarn. There are two main techniques to create these different yarns: short draw creates worsted yarns, and long draw creates woollen yarns. Often a spinner will spin using a combination of both techniques and thus make a semi-worsted yarn.

Short draw spinning is used to create worsted yarns. It is spun from combed roving, sliver or wool top. The spinner keeps his/her hands very close to each other. The fibres are held, fanned out, in one hand, and the other hand pulls a small number from the mass. The twist is kept between the second hand and the wheel. There is never any twist between the two hands.

Long draw is spun from a carded rolag. The rolag is spun without much stretching of the fibres from the cylindrical configuration. This is done by allowing twist into a short section of the rolag, and then pulling back, without letting the rolag change position in one's hands, until the yarn is the desired thickness. The twist will concentrate in the thinnest part of the roving; thus, when the yarn is pulled, the thicker sections with less twist will tend to thin out. Once the yarn is the desired thickness, enough twist is added to make the yarn strong. Then the yarn is wound onto the bobbin, and the process starts again.

=== Spinning in the grease ===
Irreler Bauerntradition shows carding, spinning on Saxony wheels and knitting in the Roscheider Hof Open Air Museum

Handspinners are split, when spinning wool, as to whether it is better to spin it "in the grease" (with lanolin still in) or after it has been washed. More traditional spinners are more willing to spin in the grease, as it is less work to wash the wool after it is in yarn form. Spinners who spin very fine yarn may also prefer to spin in the grease as it can allow them to spin finer yarns with more ease. Spinning in the grease covers the spinner's hands in lanolin and, thus, softens the spinner's hands.

Spinning in the grease works best if the fleece is newly sheared. After several months, the lanolin becomes sticky, which makes the wool harder to spin using the short-draw technique, and almost impossible to spin using the long-draw technique. In general, spinners who use the long-draw technique do not spin in the grease.

Such spinners generally buy their fibres pre-washed and carded, in the form of roving, sliver, or batts. This means less work for the spinners, as they do not have to wash out the lanolin. Spinners then have available predyed fibre, or blends of fibres, which are hard to create when the wool is still in the grease. As machine carders cannot card wool in the grease, pre-carded yarn generally is not spun in the grease. Some spinners use spray-on lanolin-like products to get the same feel of spinning in the grease with carded fibre.

== See also ==
- Cotton mill
- Crochet
- Khādī
- Knitting
- Loom
- Magnetic ring spinning
- Ontario Handweavers & Spinners
- Weaving
