= Spinning wheel =

Device for spinning thread, yarn, or silk from natural or synthetic fibers

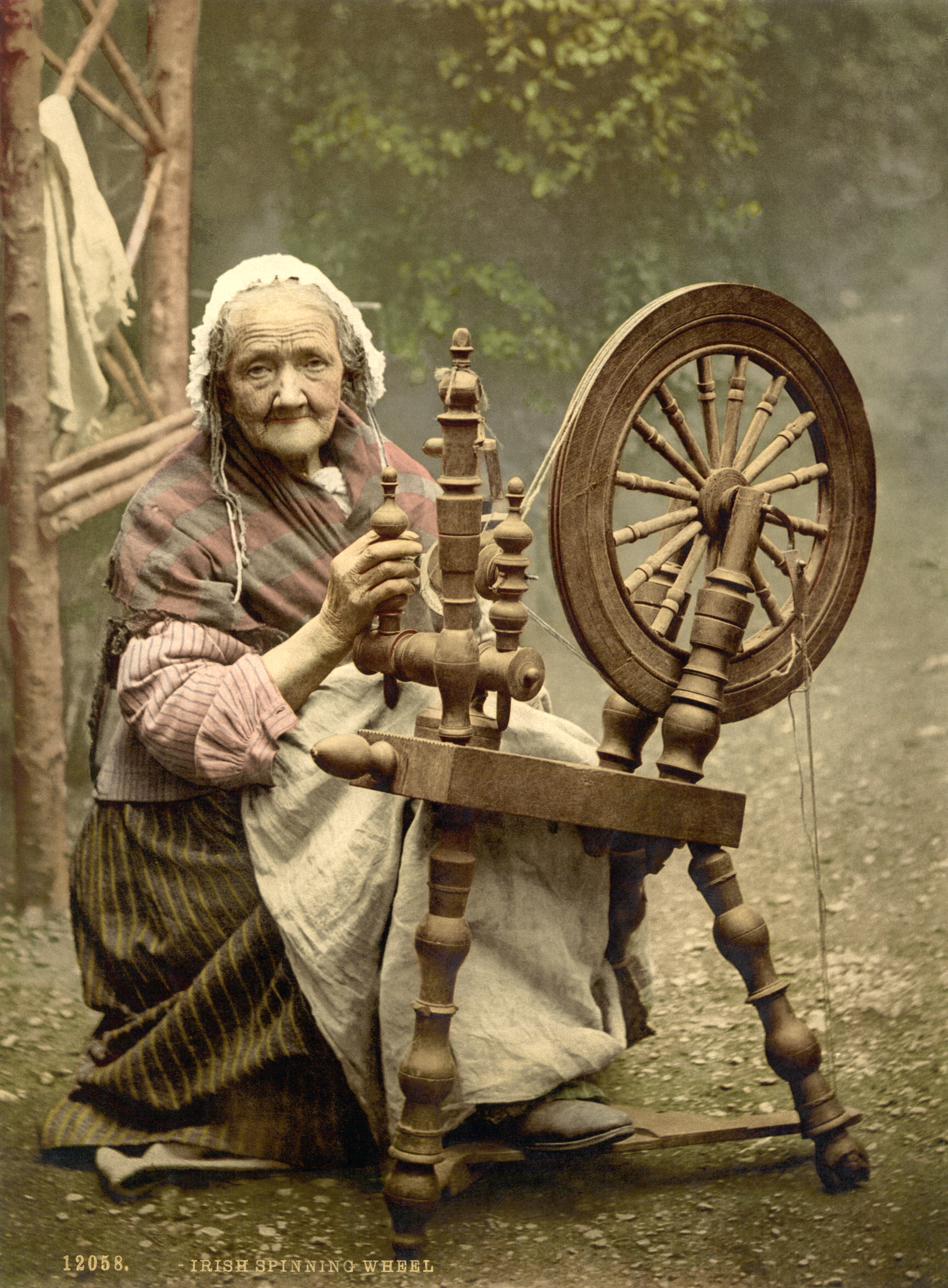
An elderly Irish woman with a spinning wheel

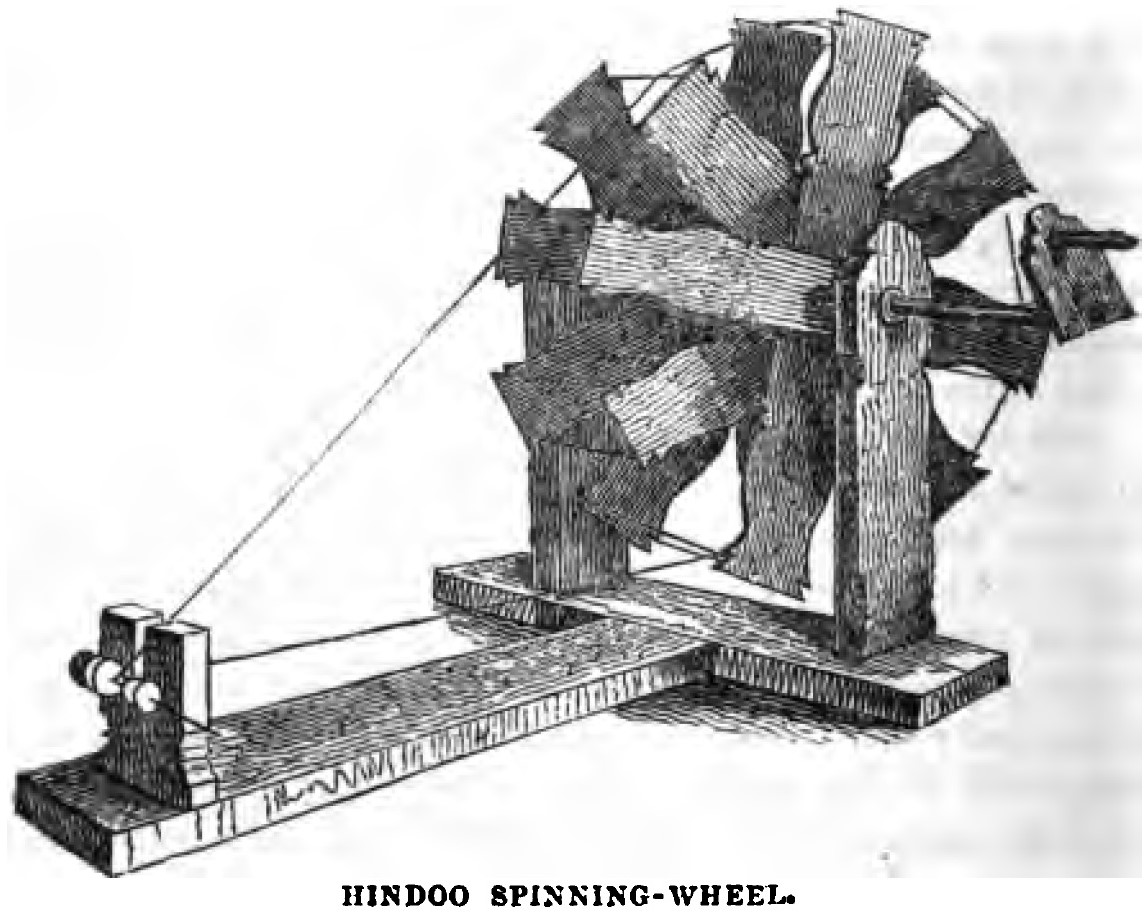
Hindoo Spinning-Wheel (1852)

A spinning wheel is a device for spinning thread or yarn from fibres. It was fundamental to the textile industry prior to the Industrial Revolution. It laid the foundations for later machinery such as the spinning jenny and spinning frame, which displaced the spinning wheel during the Industrial Revolution.

== Function ==
The basic spinning of yarn involves taking a clump of fibres and teasing a bit of them out, then twisting it into a basic string shape. The spinner continues pulling and twisting the yarn in this manner to make it longer and longer while also controlling the thickness. Thousands of years ago, people began using a weighted stick, called a spindle, to speed up the process of spinning by twisting it quickly between the fingers and allowing it to carry the momentum of the twist.

The spinning wheel automates the twisting process, increasing the speed of yarn production and improving the quality of the finished product due to more consistent twist speed. The larger wheel now drives the spindle, rather than the spindle being twisted by hand.

The wheel itself was originally free-moving, spun by a hand or foot reaching out and turning it directly. Eventually, simple mechanisms were added that let the spinner push a pedal, called a treadle, to keep the wheel turning at a more constant rate. This mechanism was the main source of technological progress for the spinning wheel before the 18th century.

== History ==
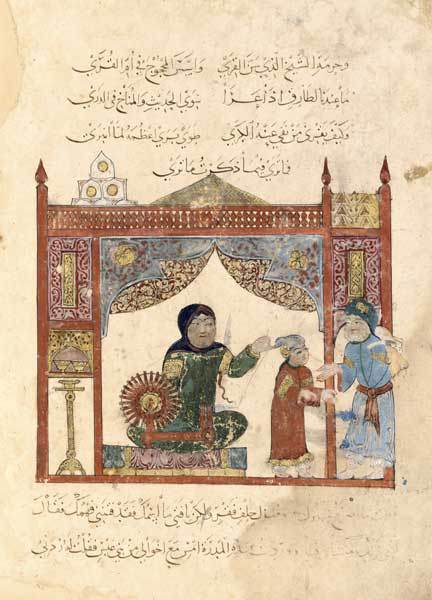
Scene from Al-Maqamat, painted by al-Wasiti (1237)

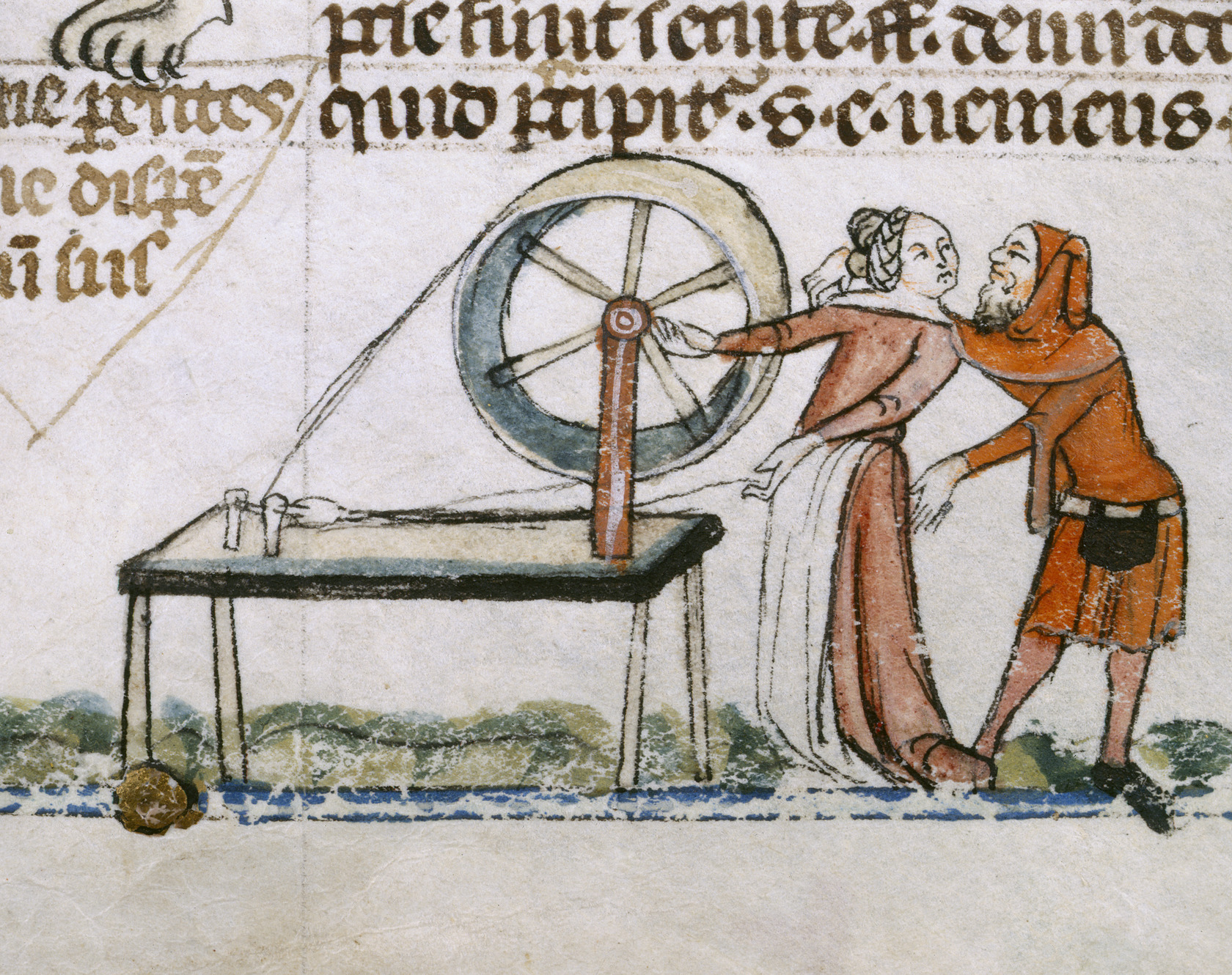
Spinning wheel depicted in the Smithfield Decretals, between 1300 and 1340

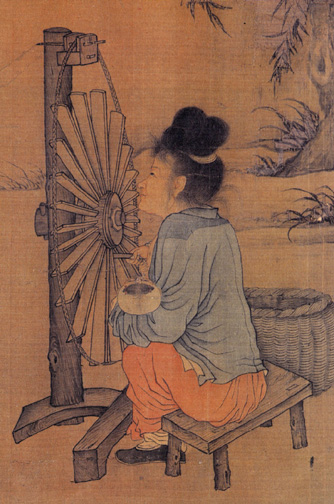
Detail of The Spinning Wheel, by Chinese artist Wang Juzheng, Northern Song dynasty (c. 1270)

The history of the spinning wheel is disputed, with:

- J. M. Kenoyer, involved in the study of the Indus Valley Civilization, speculating that the uniformity of the thread and tight weave from a clay impression indicates the use of a spinning wheel rather than drop spindles, but according to Mukhtar Ahmed, the spinning whorls used since prehistoric times by the Indus Valley people produce a tight weave.
- Dieter Kuhn and Weiji Cheng propose the spinning wheel originated in Zhou dynasty China, in the first millennium BCE, are mentioned in Chinese dictionaries of the 2nd century AD , and in widespread use by c. 1090, with the earliest clear Chinese illustration of the machine dated to around 1270.
- C. Wayne Smith and J. Tom Cothren, propose the spinning wheel was invented in India as early as 500–1000 AD.
- Arnold Pacey and Irfan Habib propose the spinning wheel was most likely invented in the Middle-East by the early 11th century. There is evidence pointing to the spinning wheel being known in the Middle-East by 1030, and the earliest clear illustration of the spinning wheel is from Baghdad, drawn in 1237. Arnold Pacey and Irfan Habib suggest that early references to cotton spinning in India are vague and do not clearly identify a wheel, but more likely refer to hand spinning, offering as the earliest unambiguous reference to a spinning wheel in India, 1350, is a passage in Abdul Malik Isami’s work, Futuh-us-Salatin, which proposes a woman's place is at her Charkha.
- K. A. Nilakanta Sastri and Vijaya Ramaswamy suggest there is clear reference to the use of a spinning wheel (with a description of its parts) by the 12th century in India, by Kannada poet, Remmavve.

The spinning wheel spread from the Middle East to Europe by the 13th century, with the earliest European illustration dated to around 1280. In France, the spindle and distaff were not displaced until the mid 18th century.

The spinning wheel replaced the earlier method of hand spinning with a spindle. The first stage in mechanizing the process was mounting the spindle horizontally so it could be rotated by a cord encircling a large, hand-driven wheel. The great wheel is an example of this type, where the fibre is held in the left hand and the wheel slowly turned with the right. Holding the fibre at a slight angle to the spindle produced the necessary twist. The spun yarn was then wound onto the spindle by moving it so as to form a right angle with the spindle. This type of wheel, while known in Europe by the 14th century, was not in general use until later. The construction of the great wheel made it very good at creating long-drawn, soft fuzzy wools, but it was difficult to create the strong smooth yarns needed to create warp for weaving. Spinning wheels ultimately did not develop the capability to spin a variety of yarns until the beginning of the 19th century and the mechanization of spinning.

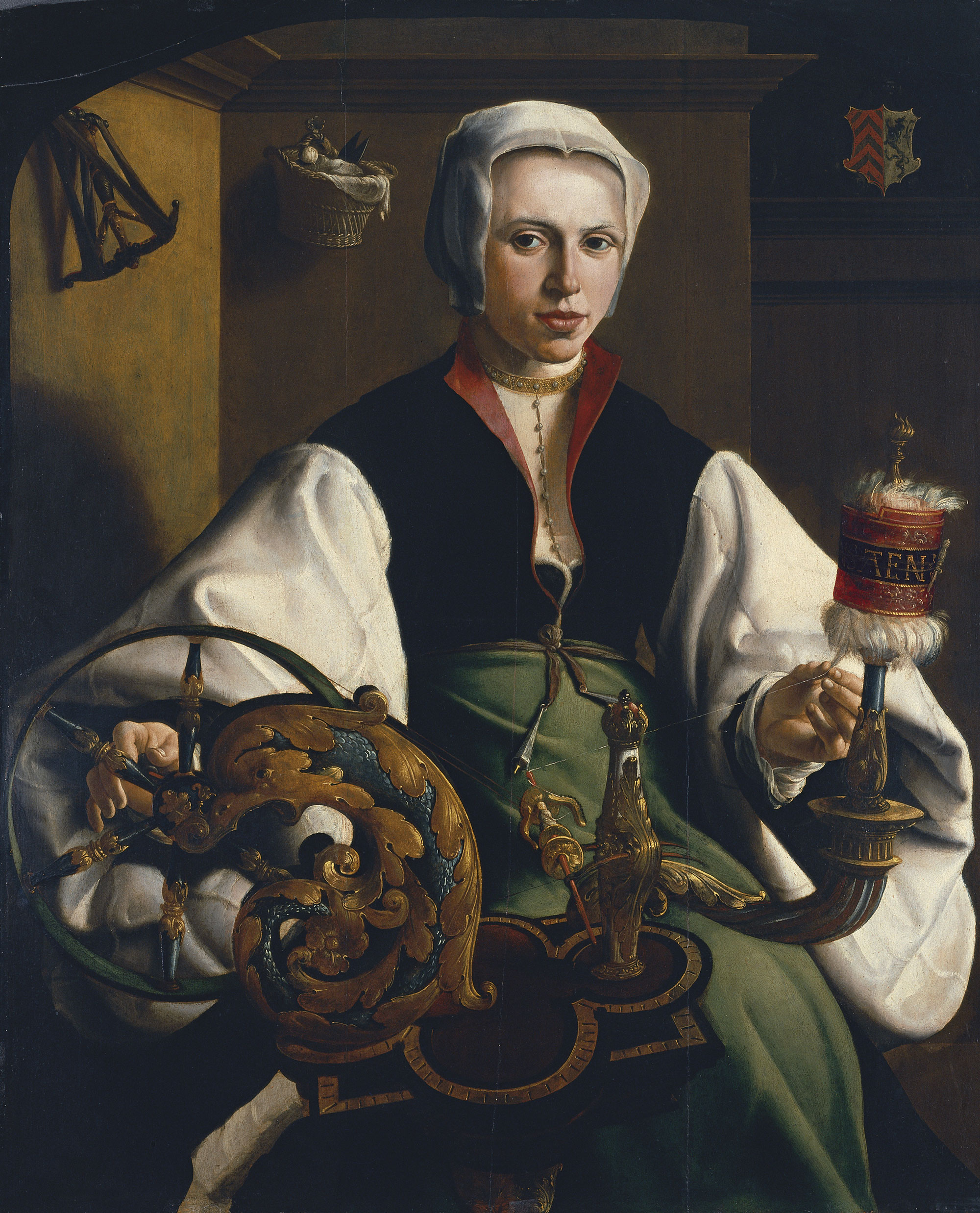
Spinning with a flyer, circa 1531. Note the lack of treadle; the wheel is turned by hand.

In general, spinning technology was known for a long time before being adopted by the majority of people, thus making it hard to fix dates of the improvements. In 1533, a citizen of Brunswick is said to have added a treadle, by which the spinner could rotate the spindle with one foot and have both hands free to control the fibre. Leonardo da Vinci drew a picture of a flyer, which twists the yarn before winding it onto the spindle. During the 16th century the treadle wheel with a flyer was in common use, and gained such names as the Saxony wheel and the flax wheel. The addition of the flyer sped up production, as one need not stop spinning to wind the yarn onto the spindle.

According to Mark Elvin, 14th-century Chinese technical manuals describe an automatic water-powered spinning wheel. Comparable devices were not developed in Europe until the 18th century. However, it fell into disuse when fibre production shifted from hemp to cotton. It was forgotten by the 17th century. The decline of the automatic spinning wheel in China is an important part of Elvin's high level equilibrium trap theory to explain why there was no indigenous Industrial Revolution in China despite its high levels of wealth and scientific knowledge.

On the eve of the Industrial Revolution it took at least five spinners to supply one weaver, slowing overall cloth production. Lewis Paul and John Wyatt first worked on the problem in 1738, patenting the Roller Spinning machine and the flyer-and-bobbin system for drawing wool to a more even thickness. Using two sets of rollers that travelled at different speeds, yarn could be twisted and spun quickly and efficiently. However, they did not have much financial success. In 1771, Richard Arkwright adapted the Roller Spinning machine and used waterwheels to power looms for the production of cotton cloth, his invention becoming known as the water frame.

Modern industrial spinning machines use a mechanical means to rotate the spindle, an automatic method to draw out fibres, and devices to work many spindles together at speeds previously unattainable. Newer technologies that offer even faster yarn production include friction spinning, an open-end system, and air jets.

== Types ==
Spinning alpaca wool, Gotthard Pass, 2018

Numerous types of spinning wheels exist, including:

- the great wheel also known as walking wheel or wool wheel for rapid long draw spinning of woolen-spun yarns;
- the flax wheel, which is a double-drive wheel used with a distaff for spinning flax fibres for making linen;
- saxony and upright wheels, all-purpose treadle driven wheels used to spin both woolen and worsted-spun yarns; and
- the charkha, native to Asia.

Spinning yarn on any spinning wheel requires prepared fibre; excepting silk, which can be spun directly from unwound cocoons, fibres must be prepared for spinning, usually by combing or carding. At the very least, foreign matter (dirt, plant stalks, or animal manure) must be removed before spinning. Most handspinners spin from 'a fluffy mass of aligned fibers' to more easily produce a consistent yarn.

=== Charkha ===
The tabletop or floor charkha is one of the oldest known forms of the spinning wheel. The charkha works similarly to the great wheel, with a drive wheel being turned by one hand, while the yarn is spun off the tip of the spindle with the other. The floor charkha and the great wheel closely resemble each other. With both, yarn must be held off the end of the spindle in order to twist it, and off-axis to wind the yarn onto the spindle.

The word charkha, which has links with Persian چرخ (Romanized: charkh), wheel, is related to the Sanskrit word for "circle" (cakra). The charkha was both a tool and a symbol of the Indian independence movement. The charkha, a small, portable, hand-cranked wheel, is ideal for spinning cotton and other fine, short-staple fibres, though it can be used to spin other fibres as well. The size varies, from that of a hardbound novel to the size of a briefcase, to a floor charkha. Leaders of the India's Freedom Struggle brought the charkha into wider use with their teachings. They hoped the charkha would assist the people of India achieve self-sufficiency and independence, and therefore used the charkha as a symbol of the Indian independence movement and included it on earlier versions of the Flag of India.

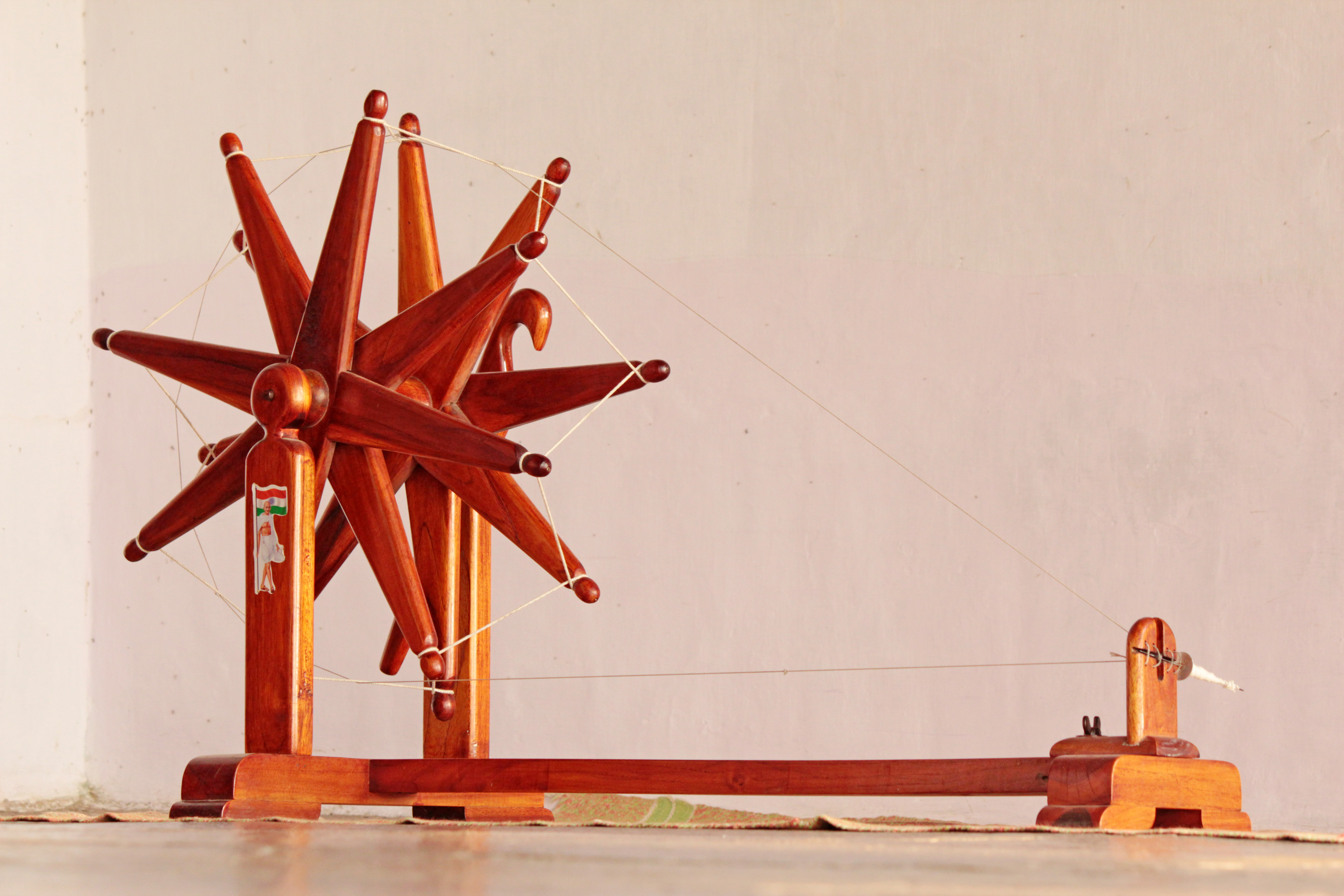
A charkha used by Mahatma Gandhi

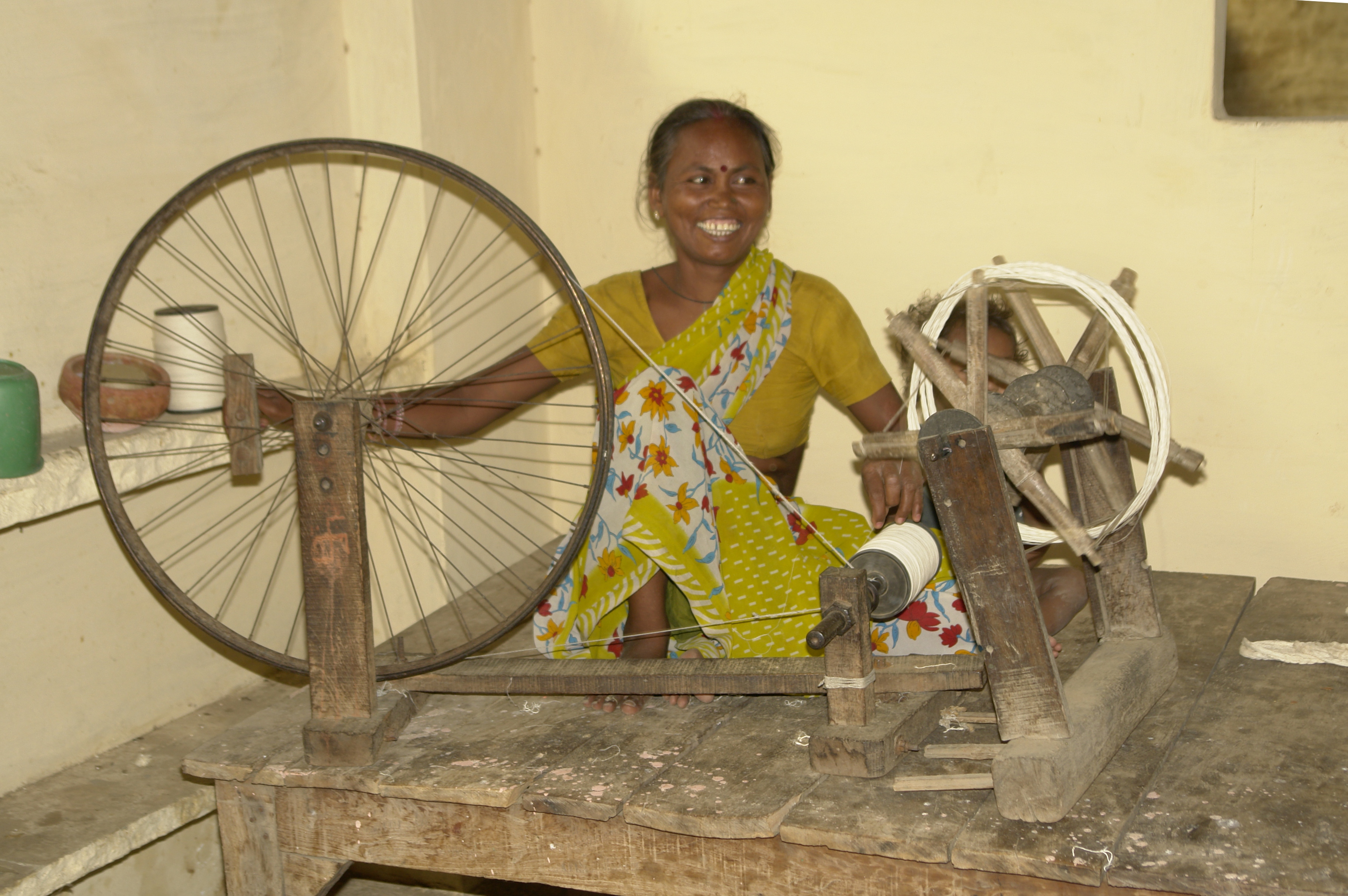
Using a bicycle-wheel charkha (and a yarn swift)

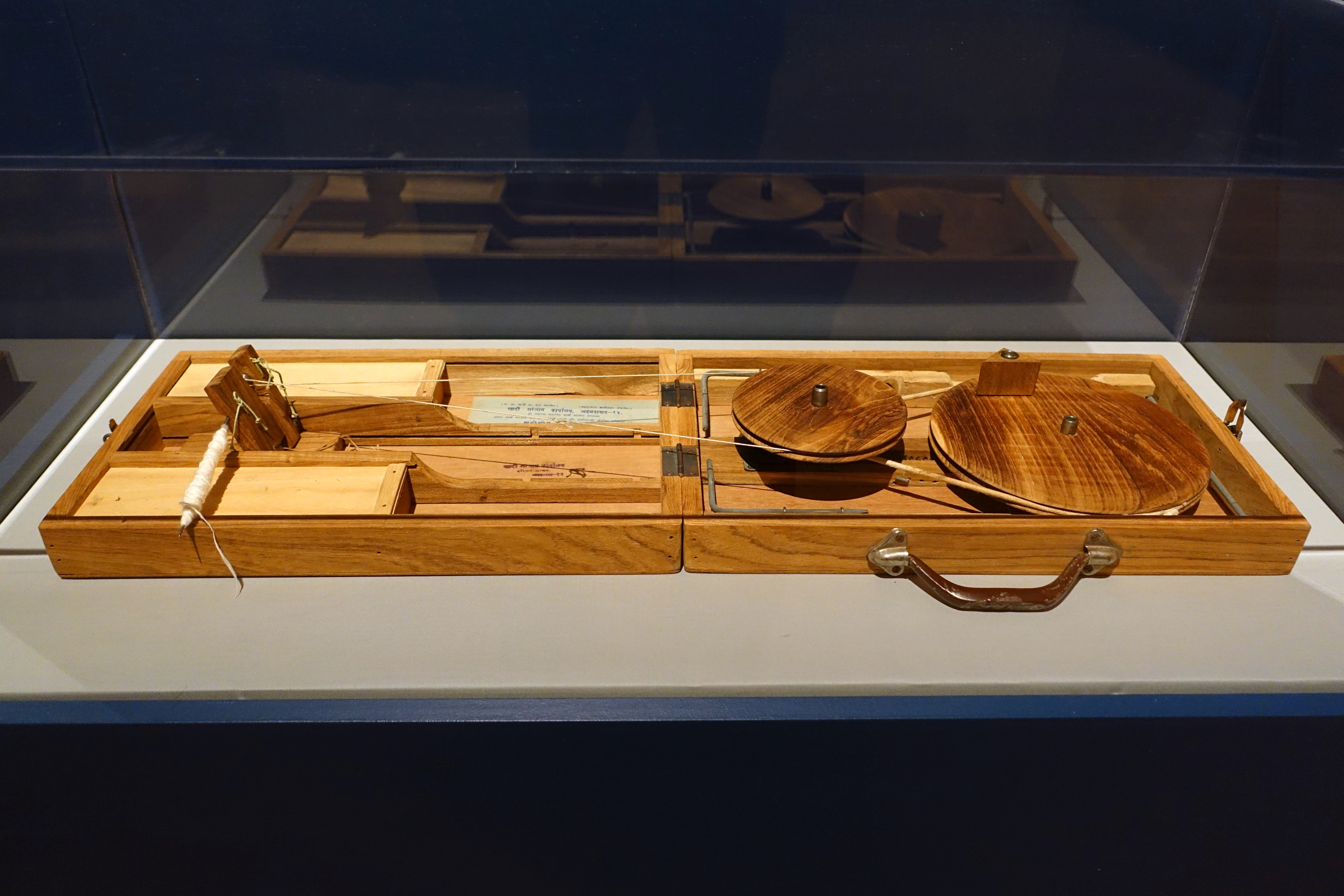
Modified and portable compact charkha (peti charkha)

A woman spinning with a peti charkha in Bangalore

=== Great wheel ===
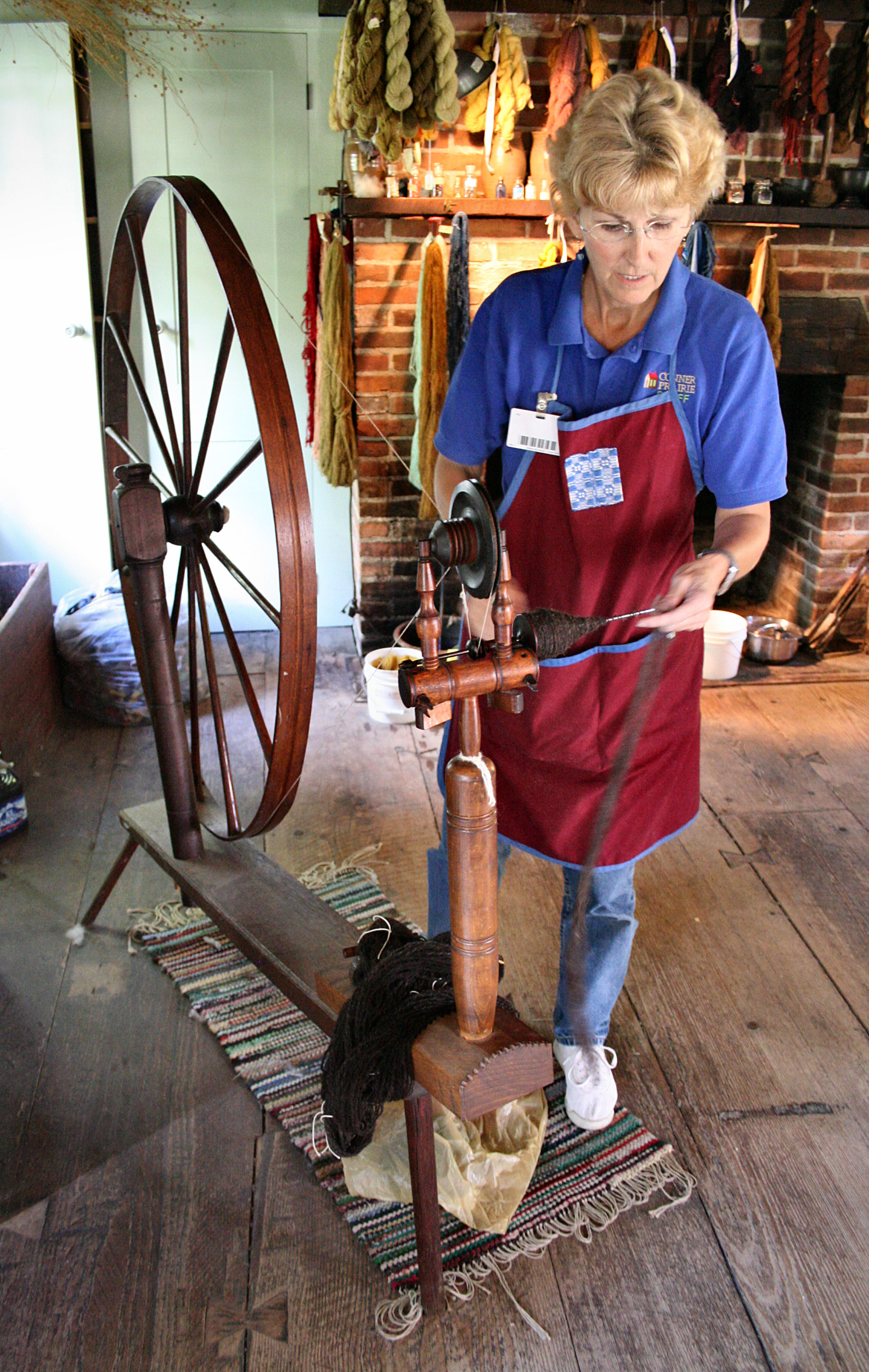
Spinning wool on a great wheel at a demonstration in the Conner Prairie living history museum loom house

The great wheel was one of the earlier types of spinning wheel. The fibre is held in the left hand and the wheel slowly turned with the right. Yarn is spun on a great wheel with the long-draw spinning technique, which requires only one active hand most of the time, thus freeing a hand to turn the wheel. The great wheel is usually used to spin short-staple fibres (this includes both cotton and wool), and can only be used with fibre preparations that are suited to long-draw spinning.

The great wheel is usually over 1.5 metres (5 feet) in height. The large drive wheel turns the much smaller spindle assembly, with the spindle revolving many times for each turn of the drive wheel. The yarn is spun at an angle off the tip of the spindle, and is then stored on the spindle. To begin spinning on a great wheel, first a leader (a length of waste yarn) is tied onto the base of the spindle and spiraled up to the tip. Then the spinner overlaps a handful of fibre with the leader, holding both gently together with the left hand, and begins to slowly turn the drive wheel clockwise with the right hand, while simultaneously walking backward and drawing the fibre in the left hand away from the spindle at an angle. The left hand must control the tension on the wool to produce an even result. Once a sufficient amount of yarn has been made, the spinner turns the wheel backward a short distance to unwind the spiral on the spindle, then turns it clockwise again, and winds the newly made yarn onto the spindle, finishing the wind-on by spiralling back out to the tip again to make another draw.

=== Treadle wheel ===
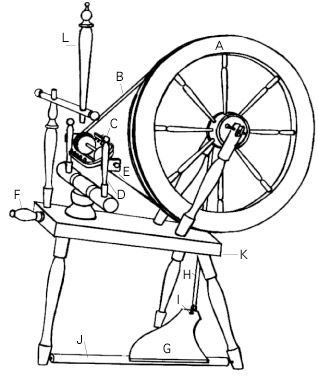
Parts of a treadle wheel: A - Wheel, B - Drive band, C - Flyer assembly, D - Maiden, E - Bearings, F - Tension Screw, G - Treadle, H - Footman, I - Treadle connection, J - Treadle bar, K - Table, L - Distaff

This type of wheel is powered by the spinner's foot rather than their hand or a motor. The spinner sits and pumps a foot treadle that turns the drive wheel via a crankshaft and a connecting rod. This leaves both hands free for drafting the fibres, which is necessary in the short draw spinning technique, which is often used on this type of wheel. The old-fashioned pointed driven spindle is not a common feature of the treadle wheel. Instead, most modern wheels employ a flyer-and-bobbin system which twists the yarn and winds it onto a spool simultaneously. These wheels can be single- or double-treadle; which is a matter of personal preference and ergonomics and does not materially affect the operation of the wheel.

==== Double drive ====
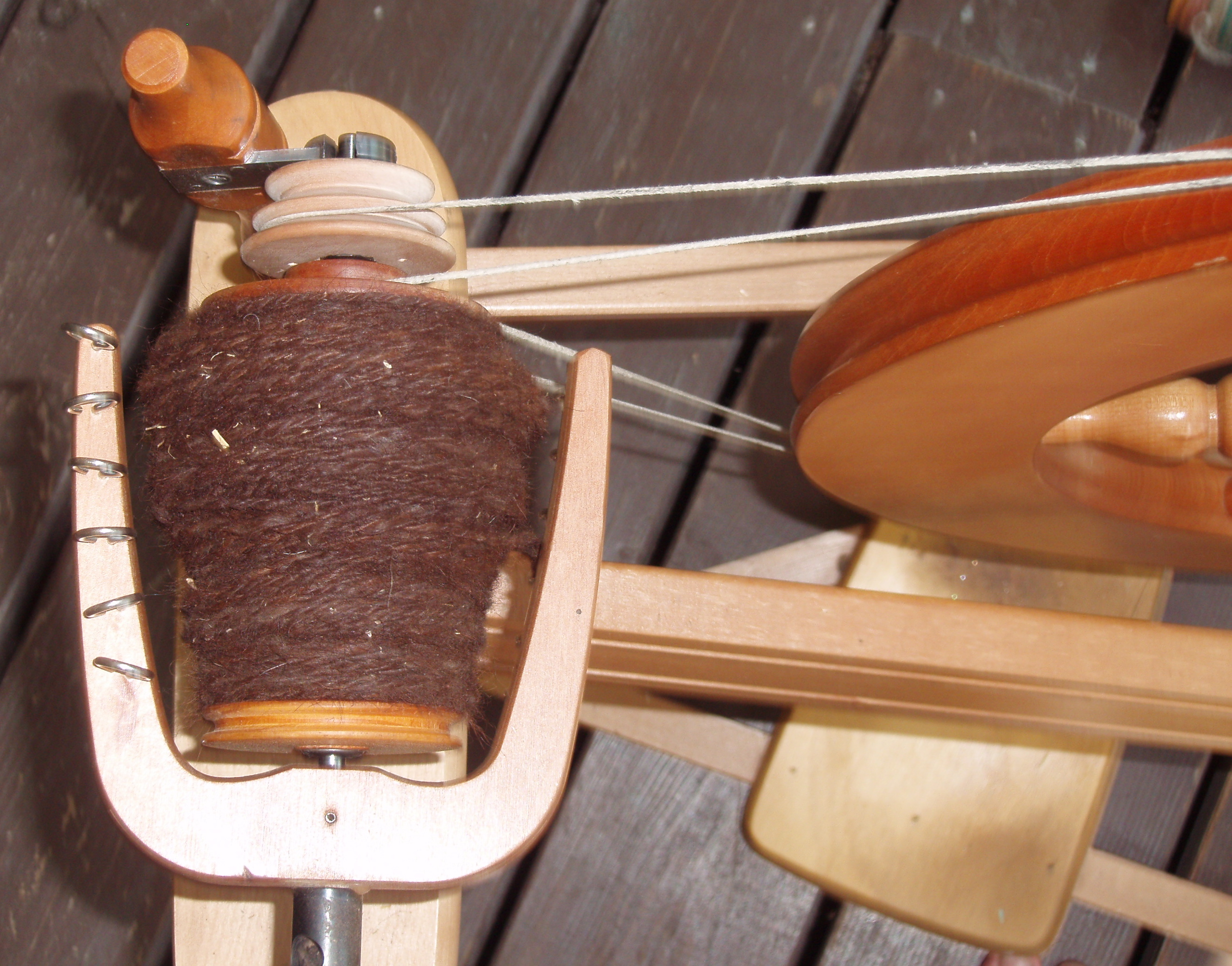
A double drive wheel

The double drive wheel is named after its drive band, which goes around the spinning wheel twice. The drive band turns the flyer, which is the horse-shoe shaped piece of wood surrounding the bobbin, as well as the bobbin. Due to a difference in the size of the whorls (the round pieces or pulleys around which the drive band runs) the bobbin whorl, which has a smaller radius than the flyer whorl, turns slightly faster. Thus both the flyer and bobbin rotate to twist the yarn, and the difference in speed winds the yarn onto the bobbin when the spinner lets up tension on the newly spun yarn, and spins the bobbin and flyer together to add spin to the yarn when the spinner keeps the new yarn under tension (in this case, the drive band will slip slightly in the groove in the bobbin, flyer whorl, or both). Generally the speed difference or "ratio" is adjusted by the size of the whorls and the tension of the drive band.

The drive band on the double drive wheel is generally made from a non-stretch cotton or hemp yarn or twine.

==== Single drive ====
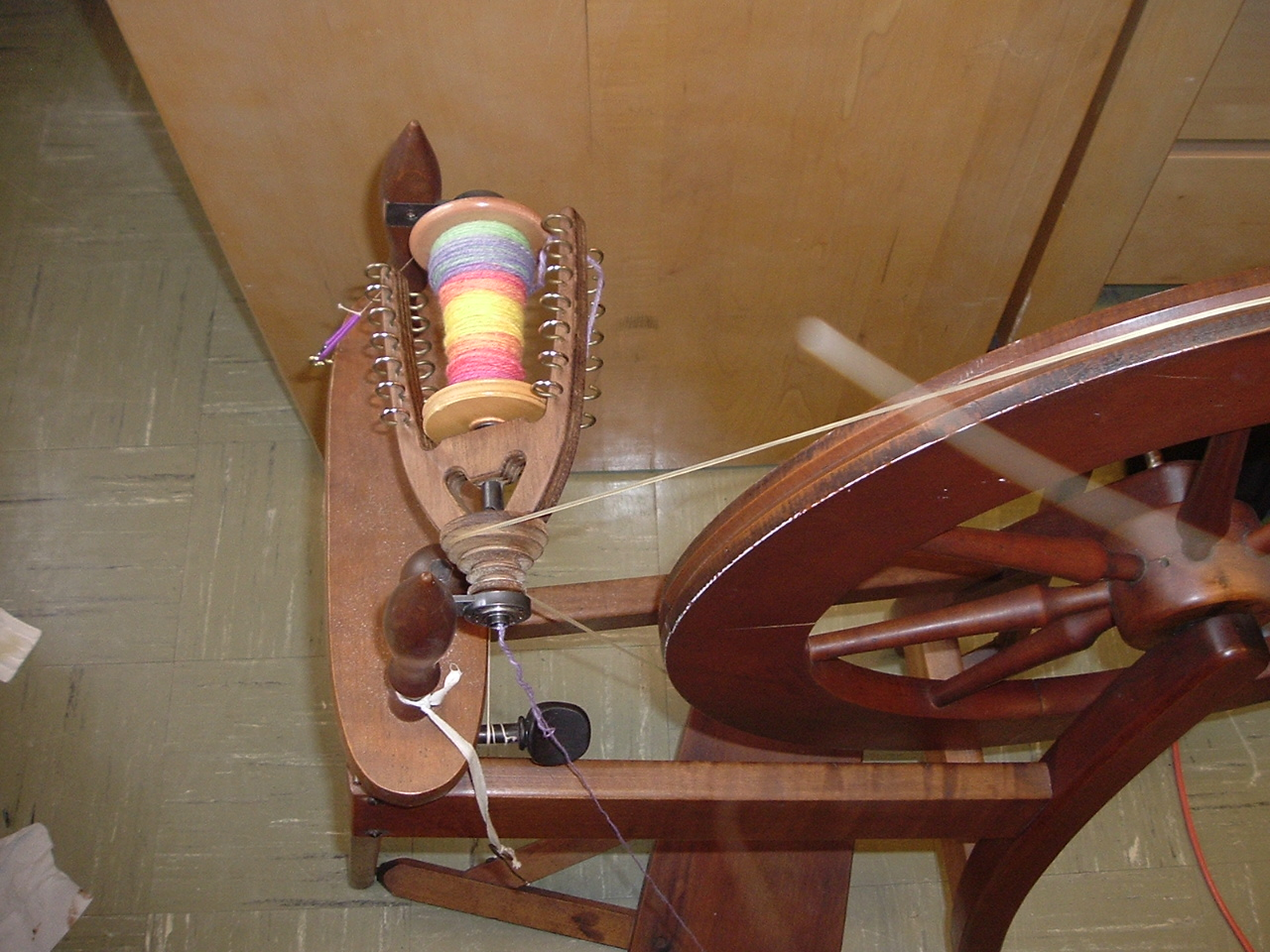
A single-drive wheel with the drive band around flyer and brake on the bobbin

A single drive wheel set up in Scotch tension has one drive band connecting the drive wheel to the flyer. The spinning drive wheel turns the flyer and, via friction with the flyer shaft, the bobbin. A short tension band, or brake band, adds drag to the bobbin such that when the spinner loosens their tension on the newly spun yarn, the bobbin and flyer spin relative to each other and the yarn is wound onto the bobbin. A tighter tension band increases relative torque and 'pulls' the yarn onto the bobbin more forcefully; a looser tension band 'pulls' the yarn more gently. Generally, the tension band is tighter for spinning thicker yarn or yarn with less twist, and looser for spinning thinner yarn or yarn with more twist.

For a single drive wheel set up in Irish tension, or 'bobbin lead', the drive band drives the bobbin and the tension band brakes the flyer. Some wheels can be set up in either single drive configuration, others only one. Additionally some wheels can be set up either in double drive or single drive.

==== Upright style ====
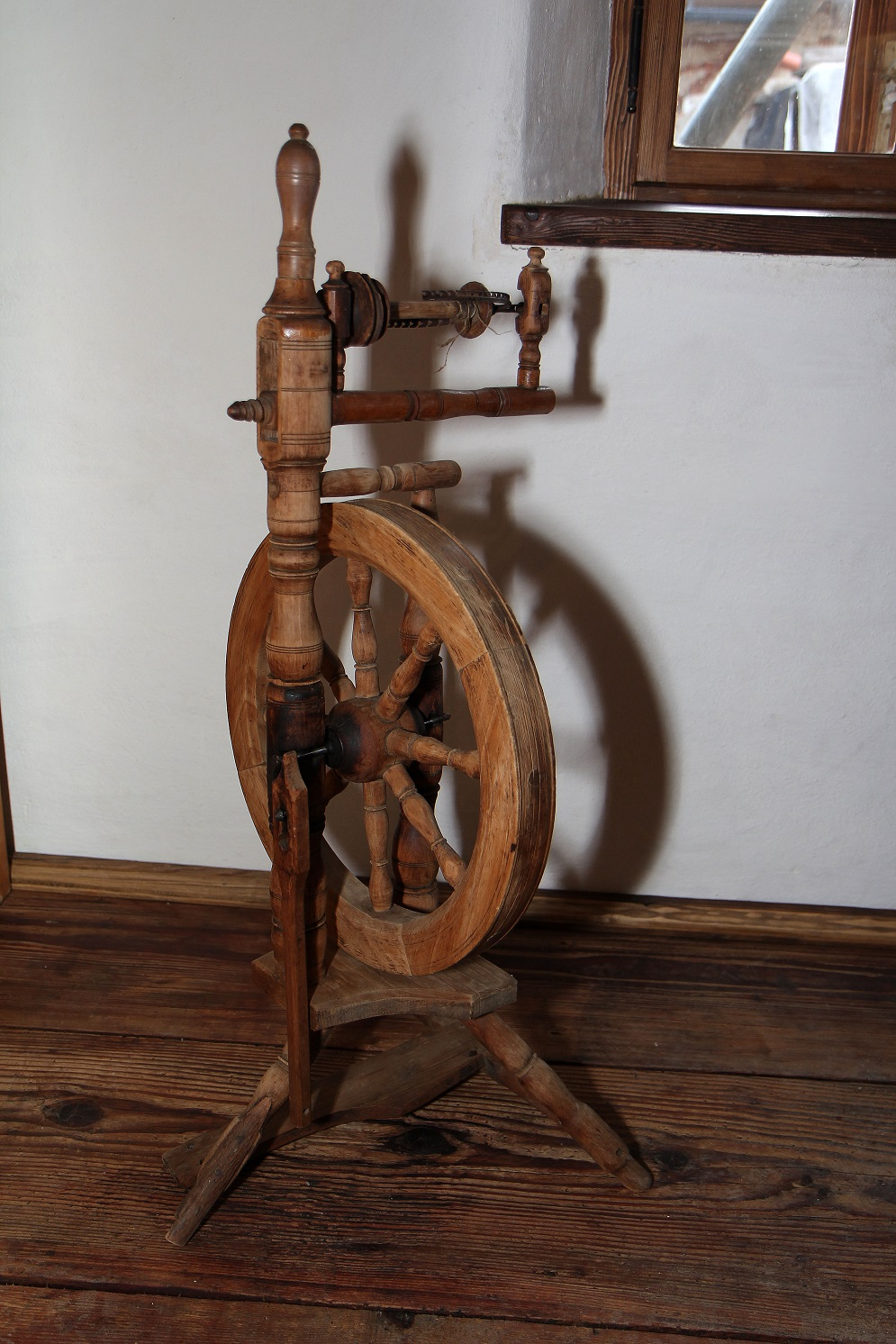
An upright wheel, also known as the castle wheel

When the spindle or flyer is located above the wheel, rather than off to one side, the wheel is called an upright wheel or castle wheel. This type of wheel is often more compact, thus easier to store and transport. Some upright wheels are even made to fold up small enough that they fit in carry-on luggage at the airport. An Irish castle wheel is a type of upright in which the flyer is located below the drive wheel.

==== Electric spinning wheel ====
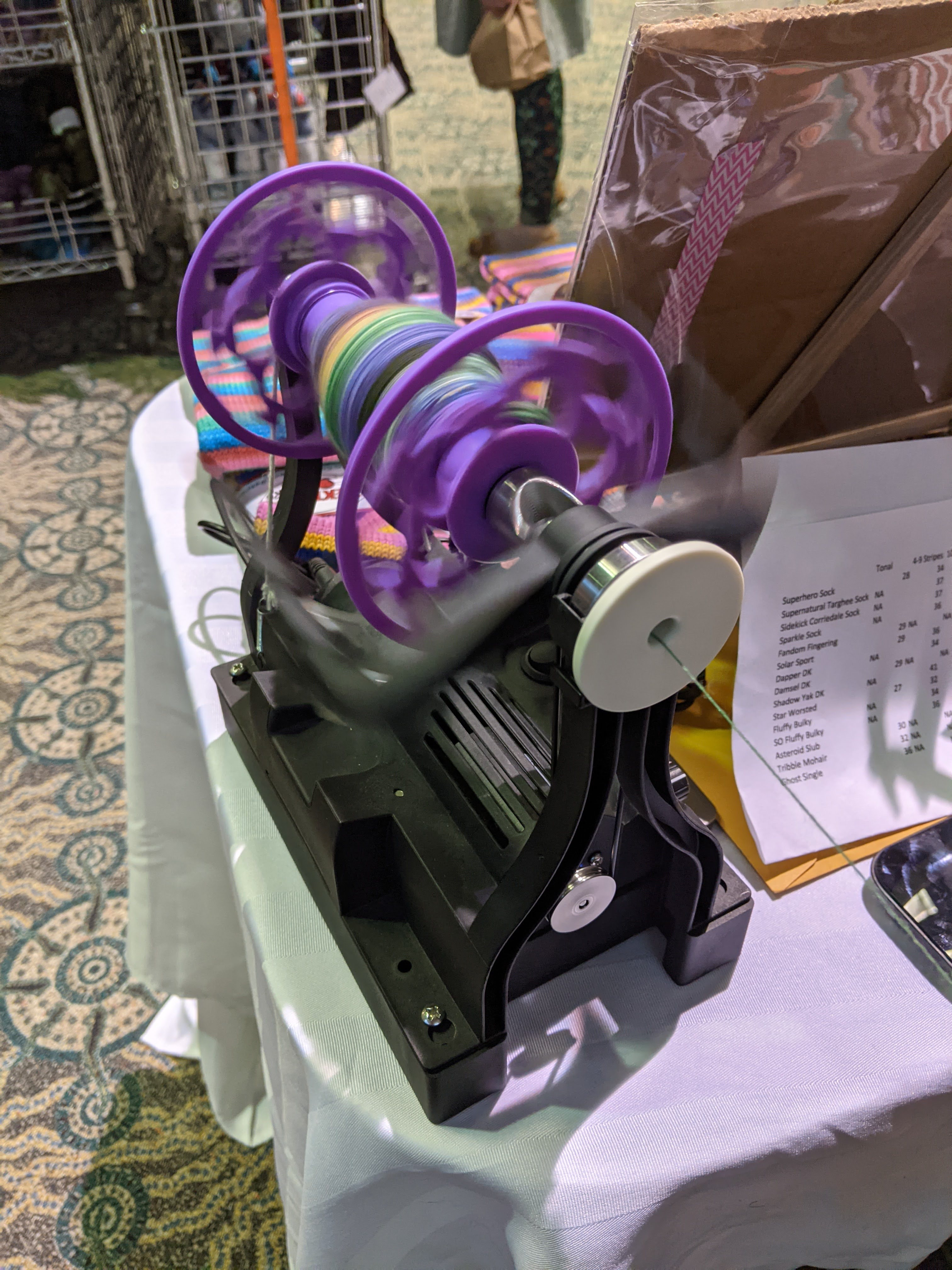
A purple and black tabletop electric spinning wheel, or espinner. An electric motor in the base drives the flyer.

An electric spinning wheel, or e-spinner, is powered by an electric motor rather than via a treadle and contains no large drive wheel. Some require mains power while others may be powered by a low-voltage source, such as a rechargeable battery. Most e-spinners are smaller, more portable, and quieter than treadle wheels. One of the attractions of an e-spinner is that it is not necessary to coordinate treadling with handling the fibre (drafting), so it can be easier to learn to spin on an e-spinner than a traditional treadle-style spinning wheel. E-spinners are also suitable for spinners who have trouble treadling or keeping their treadling speed consistent.

==== Friction drive ====
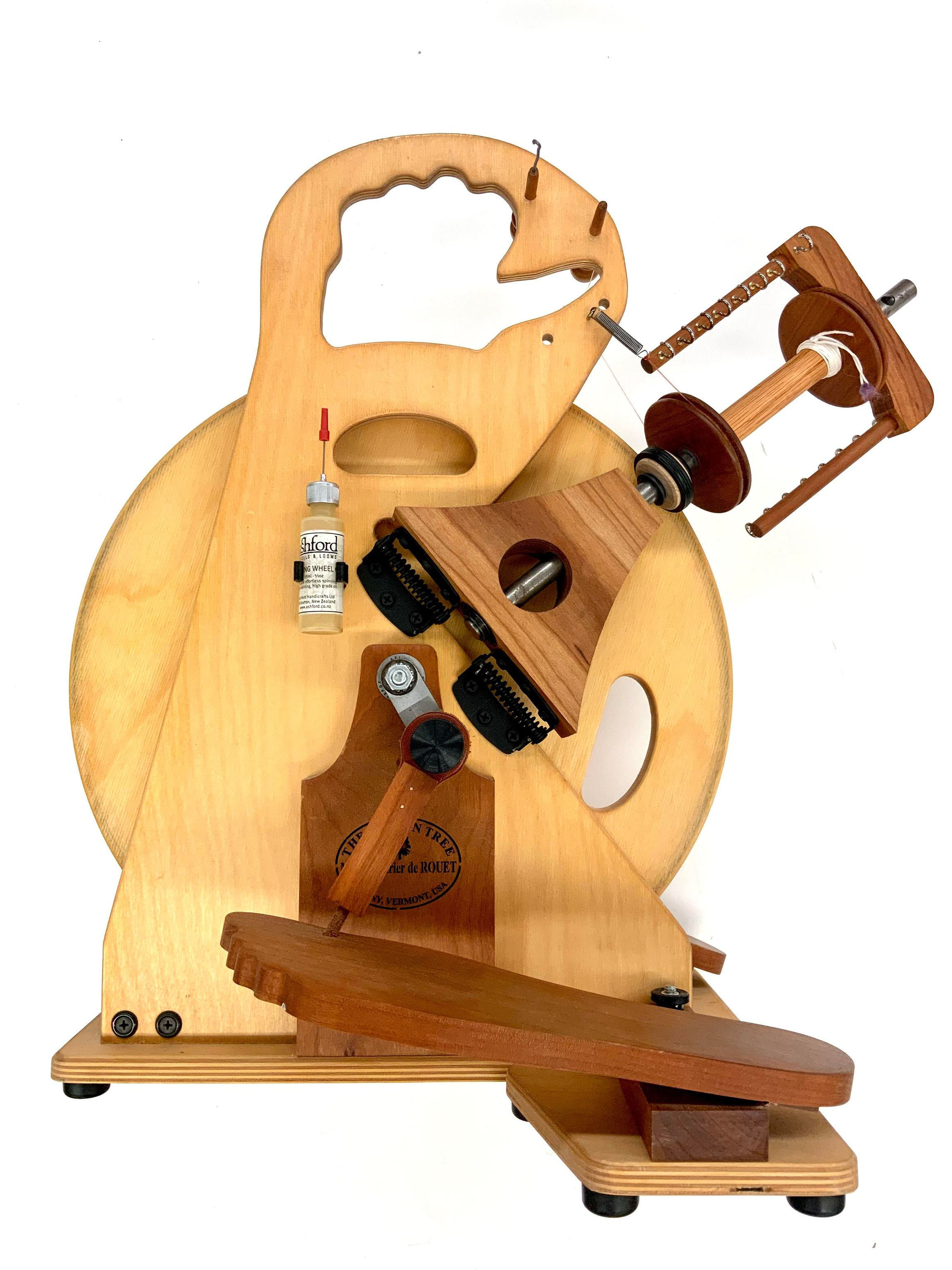
A side view of a compact friction drive wheel (Merlin Tree HitchHiker). The flyer is on the upper right.

This type of treadle-driven wheel does not use a drive band; instead the flyer is directly friction-driven via a rubber ring in contact at a right angle to the flat surface of a solid drive wheel. One example from New Zealand dates to 1918, and a very few other models using this drive method have been manufactured since 1970. These wheels are extremely compact and less fouled by outdoor dirt than drive-band wheels, but they are quite uncommon.

== Importance ==
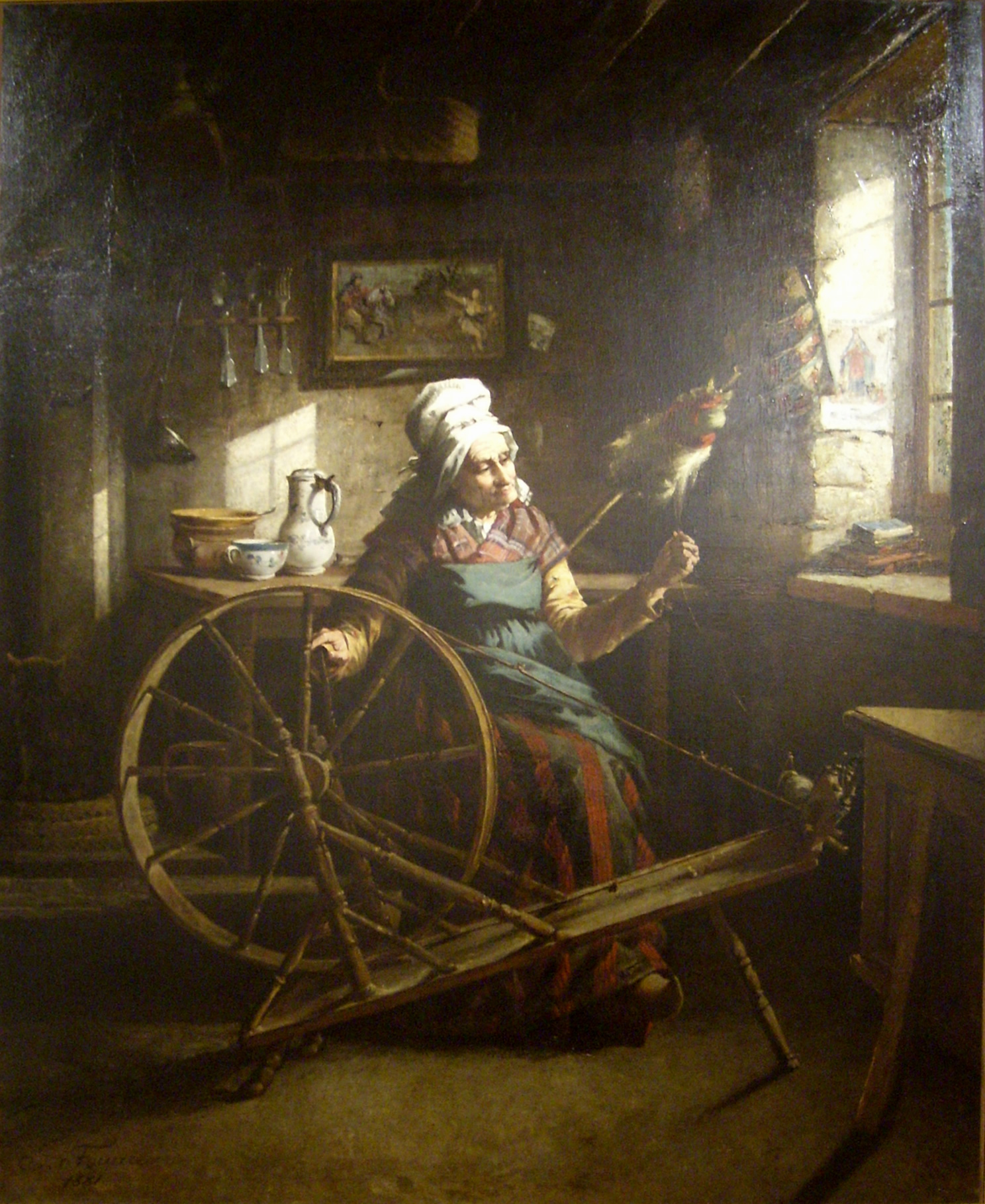
"The last spinner in my village", 1881. Hand spinning declined with the advent of more automated methods.

The spinning wheel increased the productivity of thread making by a factor of greater than 10. Medieval historian Lynn Townsend White Jr. credited the spinning wheel with increasing the supply of rags, which led to cheap paper, which in turn was a factor in the development of printing.

It was fundamental to the cotton textile industry prior to the Industrial Revolution. It laid the foundations for later machinery such as the spinning jenny and spinning frame, which displaced the spinning wheel during the Industrial Revolution.

The spinning wheel was a precursor to the spinning jenny, which was widely used during the Industrial Revolution. The spinning jenny was essentially an adaptation of the spinning wheel.

== Culture ==
The spinning wheel pictured in the coat of arms of Kiikka

The ubiquity of the spinning wheel has led to its inclusion in the art, literature and other expressions of numerous cultures around the world, and in the case of South Asia it has become a powerful political symbol.

=== Political symbolism ===
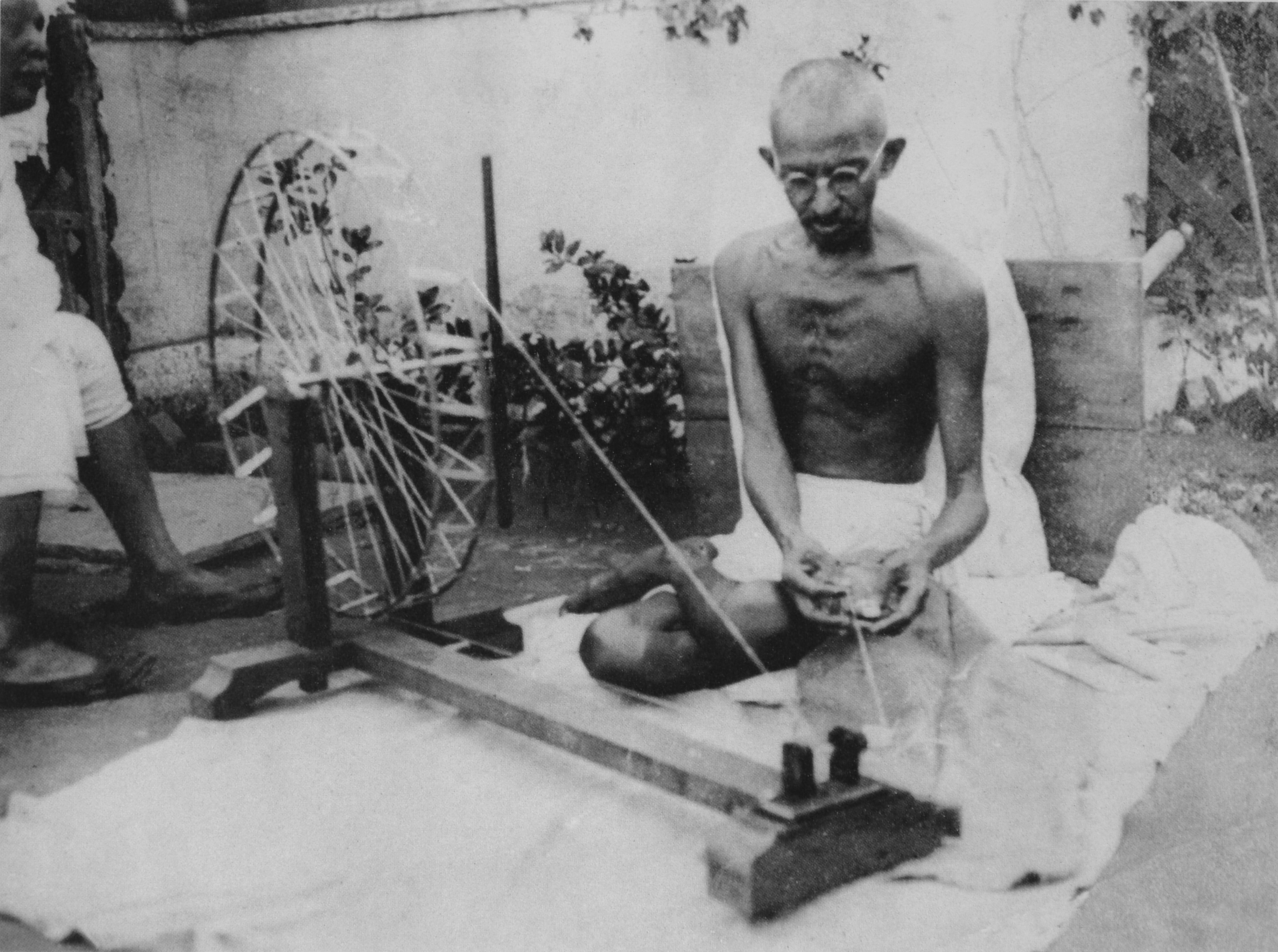
Mahatma Gandhi spinning yarn on a charkha

Starting in 1931, the traditional spinning wheel became the primary symbol on the flag of the Provisional Government of Free India.

Mahatma Gandhi’s manner of dress and commitment to hand spinning were essential elements of his philosophy and politics. He chose the traditional loincloth as a rejection of Western culture and a symbolic identification with the poor of India. His personal choice became a powerful political gesture as he urged his more privileged followers to copy his example and discard—or even burn—their European-style clothing and return with pride to their ancient, pre-colonial culture. Gandhi claimed that spinning thread in the traditional manner also had material advantages, as it would create the basis for economic independence and the possibility of survival for India’s impoverished rural areas. This commitment to traditional cloth making was also part of a larger swadeshi movement, which aimed for the boycott of all British goods. As Gandhi explained to Charlie Chaplin in 1931, the return to spinning did not mean a rejection of all modern technology but of the exploitative and controlling economic and political system in which textile manufacture had become entangled. Gandhi said, “Machinery in the past has made us dependent on England, and the only way we can rid ourselves of the dependence is to boycott all goods made by machinery. This is why we have made it the patriotic duty of every Indian to spin his own cotton and weave his own cloth."

=== Literature and folk tales ===
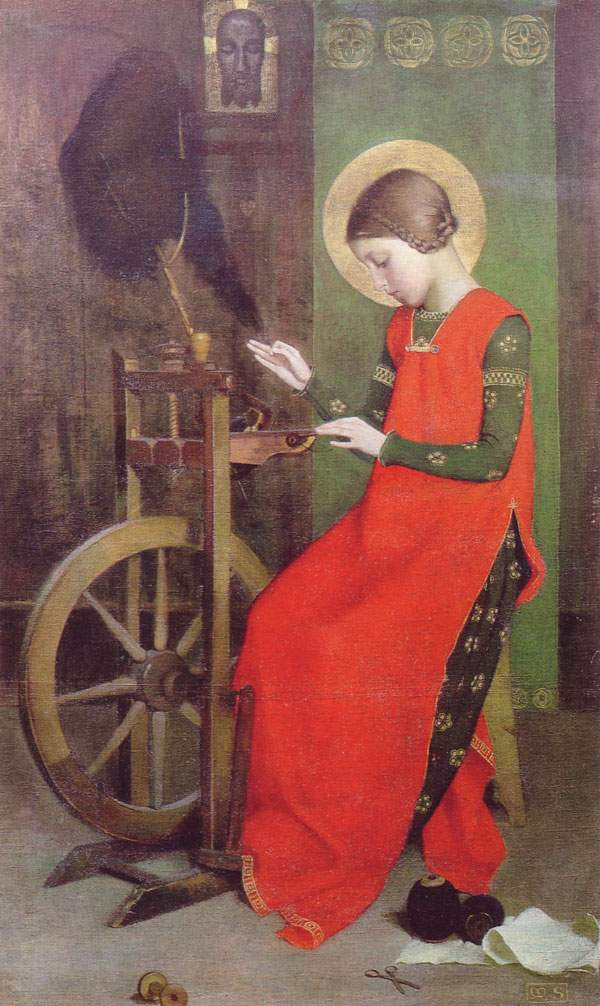
St Elizabeth of Hungary Spinning for the Poor, by Marianne Stokes. The depiction of St Elizabeth shows a castle-style spinning wheel and a distaff used to hold the fibre.

The Golden Spinning Wheel (Zlatý kolovrat) is a Czech poem by Karel Jaromír Erben that was included in his classic collection of folk ballads, Kytice.

Rumpelstiltskin, one of the tales collected by the Brothers Grimm, revolves around a woman who is imprisoned under threat of execution unless she can spin straw into gold. Rumpelstiltskin helps her with this task, ultimately at the cost of her first-born child; however, she makes a new bargain with him and is able to keep her child after successfully guessing his name.

Spinning wheels are also integral to the plot or characterization in the Scottish folk tale Habitrot and the German tales The Three Spinners and The Twelve Huntsmen.

Louisa May Alcott, most famous as the author of Little Women, wrote a collection of short stories called Spinning-Wheel Stories, which were not about spinning wheels but instead meant to be read while engaging in the rather tedious act of using a spinning wheel.

==== Sleeping Beauty ====
Another folk tale that incorporates spinning wheels is the classic fairy tale Sleeping Beauty, in which the main character pricks her hand or finger on the magic spindle of a spinning wheel and falls into a deep sleep following a wicked fairy or witch's curse.

Numerous variations of the tale exist (the Brothers Grimm had one in their collection entitled Little Briar Rose), and in only some of them is the spindle actually attached to/associated with a spinning wheel. A traditional spindle does not have a sharp end that could prick a person's finger (unlike the walking wheel, often used for wool spinning). Despite this, the narrative idea persists that Sleeping Beauty or Briar Rose or Dornrosen pricks her finger on the spindle – a device which she has never seen before, as they have been banned from the kingdom in a forlorn attempt to prevent the curse of the wicked godmother-fairy.

Walt Disney included the Saxony or flax wheel in their animated film version of Perrault's tale and Rose pricks her finger on the distaff (which holds the plant fibre waiting to be spun), whereas only a spindle is used in Tchaikovsky's ballet The Sleeping Beauty which is closer to the direct translation of the French "un fuseau".

=== Music ===
==== Classical and symphonic ====
In 1814, Franz Schubert composed "Gretchen am Spinnrade", a lied for piano and voice based on a poem from Goethe's Faust. the piano part depicts Gretchen's restlessness as she spins on a spinning wheel while waiting by a window for her love to return.

Antonín Dvořák composed The Golden Spinning Wheel, a symphonic poem based on the folk ballad from Kytice by Karel Jaromír Erben.

Camille Saint-Saëns wrote Le Rouet d'Omphale (Omphale's Spinning Wheel), symphonic poem in A major, Op. 31, a musical treatment of the classical story of Omphale and Heracles.

A favorite piano work for students is Albert Ellmenreich's Spinnleidchen (Spinning Song), from his 1863 Musikalische Genrebilder, Op. 14. An ostinato of repeating melodic fifths represents the spinning wheel.

==== Folk and ballad ====
The Spinning Wheel is also the title/subject of a classic Irish folk song by John Francis Waller.

A traditional Irish folk song, Túirne Mháire, is generally sung in praise of the spinning wheel, but was regarded by Mrs Costelloe, who collected it, as "much corrupted", and may have had a darker narrative. It is widely taught in junior schools in Ireland.

Sun Charkhe Di Mithi Mithi Kook is a Sufi song in the Punjabi language inspired by the traditional spinning wheel. It is an ode by a lover as she remembers her beloved with the sound of every spin of her Charkha.

==== Opera ====
Spinning wheels also feature prominently in the Wagner opera The Flying Dutchman; the second act begins with local girls sitting at their wheels and singing about the act of spinning. Gilbert and Sullivan's The Yeomen of the Guard begins with a solitary character singing while spinning at her wheel, the first of their operettas not to open with a chorus.

==== Art ====
Spinning wheels may be found as motifs in art around the world, ranging from their status as domestic/utilitarian items to their more symbolic role (such as in India, where they may have political implications).

== See also ==
- Ashoka Chakra
- Hand spinning
- Spindle (textiles)
- Spinner's weasel
- Spinning (textiles)
- Spinning jenny
- National Charkha Museum
- Trinjan
