= Twist per inch =

Measure of twist in yarn

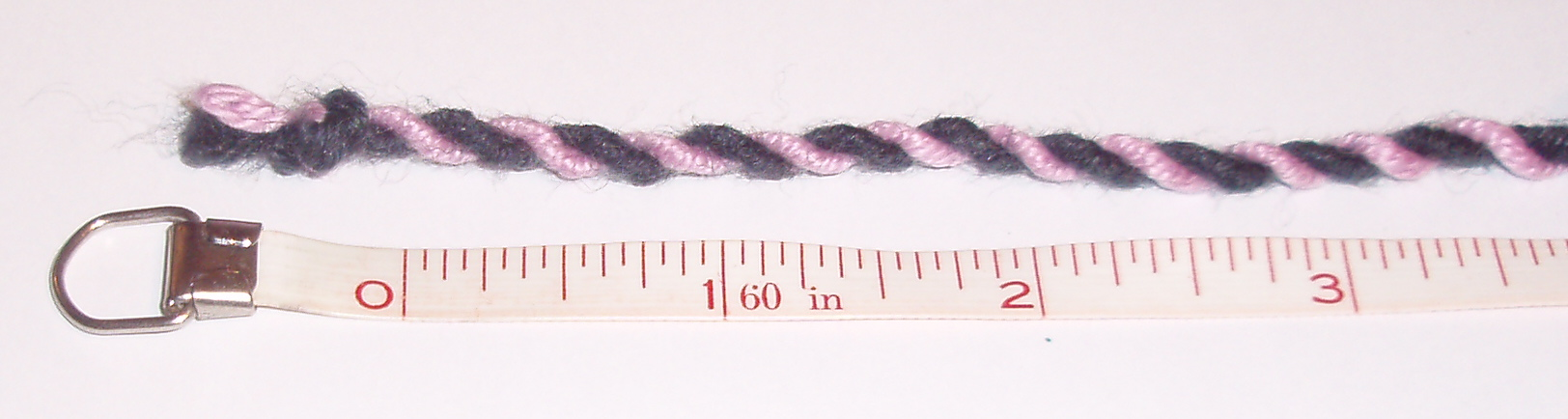
Yarn with 2.5 tpi

TPI (twists per inch or turns per inch) is a term used in the textile industry. It measures how much twist a yarn has, and can be calculated by counting the number of twists in an inch of yarn.

== Variation per yarn ==
Twist is needed in yarn to hold the fibres together, and is added in the spinning and plying processes. The amount of twist varies depending on the fibre, thickness of yarn, preparation of fibre, manner of spinning, and the desired result. Fine wool and silk generally use more twist than coarse wool, short staples more than long, thin more than thick, and short drawn more than long drawn.

The amount of twist in a yarn helps to define the style of yarn – a yarn with a lot of air such as a woollen-spun yarn will have much less twist than a yarn with little air such as a worsted-spun yarn. The amount of twist also affects the yarn in terms of stretchiness, strength, halo, and many other attributes. Filling or weft yarns usually have fewer twists per inch because strength is not as important as with warp yarns, and highly twisted yarns are, in general, stronger. Warp yarns have to be stronger so that they can withstand the tension of the loom. Filament fibers, such as silk, or many synthetics, need only be twisted slightly to create a yarn.

== Handspinning ==
Handspinners use the number of twists per inch often. Because the amount of twist defines a lot about a yarn, the number of twists per inch is an important measure to recreate a yarn. As a spinner spins, they will often stop every few minutes to check to see that the number of twists per inch is the same throughout the yarn, as well as that the number of wraps per inch (the thickness of the yarn) is the same. Measuring the number of twists per inch while spinning singles also helps the spinner create a balanced yarn when plying. Yarns that have relatively few twists per inch tend to have a softer hand but are not as strong as yarns with more twists per inch, such as medium twist or hard twist yarns. Yarns that have a very hard twist, enough so that the yarn will double back onto itself when released from tension, are called crepe-twist yarns.

== Determining how many twists per inch ==
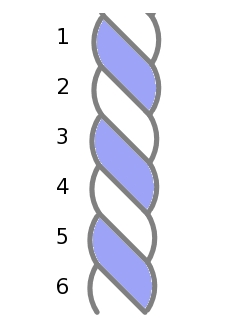

The number of twists per inch can, in plied yarns, be determined by counting the number of bumps in one inch, and dividing that number by the number of singles (the strands plied together to make the yarn). If the adjacent picture, for example, was of an inch of two ply yarn, then the number of twists per inch would be 6 divided by 2, or three, as there are six bumps, and it is a two ply.

While this method works well with plied yarns, singles don't have bumps to count. One way to determine the tpi for a single is to add a contrasting color fibre when spinning it, and then count the number of times the contrasting fibre has wrapped around the yarn. Another method is to measure an inch of yarn and untwist it, counting how many full revolutions it takes until there is no twist left. This can be done by inserting two paper-clips into the yarn, at an inch apart, thus making it easier to count a full revolution. A less precise method is to allow the single to ply against itself: the resulting two ply yarn is about half the number of twists per inch of the single. Thus one can roughly find the number of twists per inch for the single, or one can use the doubled back yarn as a measure.

With a thick-and-thin yarn, it is best to count the twist over several inches and average the results. This is because the number of twists per inch will tend to vary between the thin and thick sections.

== In industry ==
In the industry the number of twists per inch is calculated as:

$TPI = TM \times\sqrt{count}$

where $TM$ is the Twist Multiplier, also known as $K$ or the Twist Factor. This Twist Multiplier is an empirical parameter that has been established by experiments and practice that the maximum strength of a yarn is obtained for a definite value of K. In the case of ring spun cotton yarns, for example, the following values of K have been found to give the best results.

   Warp yarns, 35's and less      4.75
   Warp yarns, 35's to 80's       4.50
   Warp yarns, 80's to 110's      4.25
   Filling yarns, medium numbers  3.50

== See also ==
- Spinning
- Weaving
- Yarn
