= Solidonia =

Natural plant fiber

Solidonia was a natural plant fiber extracted from an African plant that was similar to ramie. Germany developed it, and they used it as a substitute for wool.

== Characteristics ==
Solidonia was a fine fiber with screw shaped form, resembling wool. The fiber length varied from 2.5 to 6 inches; it was long enough to be spun into yarn with woolen worsted methods of yarn spinning.

== Use ==
Germany developed Solidonia during World War I. The German army used clothing made of a blend of wool and solidonia (75% +25%). They used it in underwear, and hosiery, etc.

== See also ==
- Acrylic fiber
