= Durant (cloth) =

Glazed woolen material of the 18th century

Durant (also durance, duroy) was a glazed woolen material of the 18th century. Durant was hot-pressed with a fold in the middle, leaving a crease in the fabric. Durant was manufactured in England.

== Weave ==
Durant was a plain weave fabric, similar to other glazed woolen cloths such as Tammy and Calamanco.

== Use ==
Durant was used for quilts, upholstery and clothing.
