= Anabasse =

Kind of coarse woolen blanketing

Anabasse was a coarse woolen material, a kind of blanketing made in France and the Netherlands for the African market, or a type of coarse blanketing made in Lancashire using a wool warp and a cotton weft.

== History ==
The term originally meant a type of striped loincloth manufactured in India.

== See also ==
- Woolen
