= Woollen industry in Ireland =

The woollen industry in Ireland is not a primary export industry, unlike other regions of Britain and Ireland. The industry developed in medieval times alongside Anglo-Norman land practices, under the influence of monasteries and supported by land enclosure for pasture.

== History ==
Irish woollen frieze was prized in the medieval period for ecclesiastical vestments, but the industry was largely destroyed by English tariffs. It had periodic revivals such as at the start of the Industrial Revolution - but it faced challenges versus the industry in the North of England. Older sheep breeds known for their wool in the Irish industry were lost or became extinct, especially as the Irish market shifted to sheep rearing almost exclusively for meat in the 1970s.

The establishment of wool mills in the late 18th and 19th centuries by native Irish was enabled by the sale of land to amass capital to invest in English machinery. Many mills existed close to or adjoined Norman castles, such as Ardfinnan, Dripsey or Glanworth, indicating the use of older river and weir structures to reduce costs.

The traditional wool fabrics are Irish frieze and Irish tweed, which have their own history. The later industry collapse resulted in the loss of native qualities and traditional knowledge.

Wool mills survived from the 19th century into the 21st largely through an export market focused on the tourism trade.
