= Short draw =

Drafting technique used with long-staple fibers in hand spinning

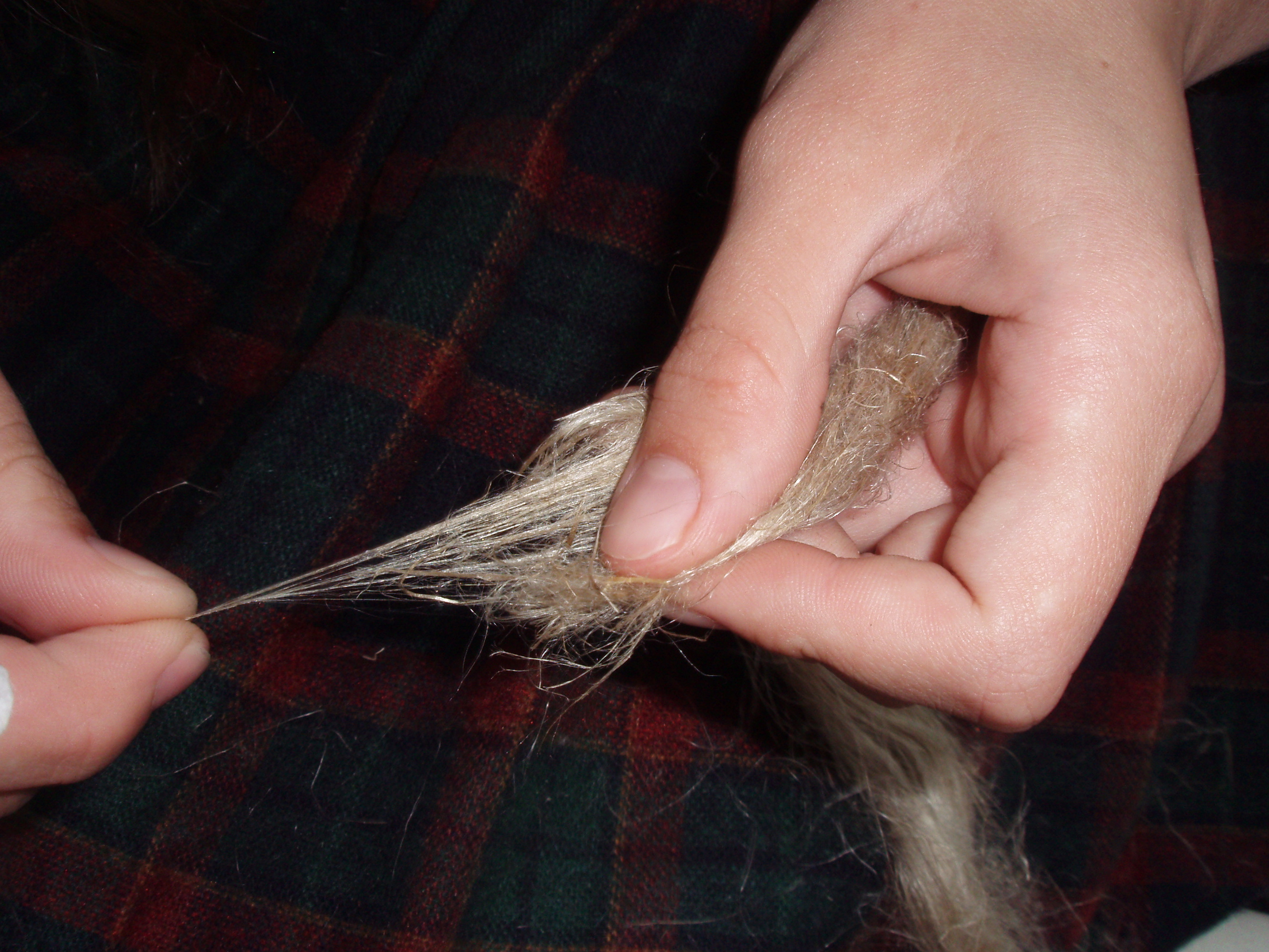
Short draw technique in action

Short draw is the spinning technique used to create worsted yarns. It is spun from combed roving, sliver or wool top – anything with the fibers all lined up parallel to the yarn. It is generally spun from long stapled fibers. Short draw spun yarns are smooth, strong, sturdy yarns, and dense. Short draw spun yarns also tend to not be very elastic. These characteristics make them good for use in weaving.

Short draw spinning is most often contrasted to the long draw technique used to spin woolen yarns.

== Technique ==
The two main characteristics of the short draw technique is that the spinner keeps their hands close to each other, at slightly more than the distance of the fiber length or staple length, and that the twist is kept between the second hand and the wheel – there is never any twist between the two hands.

There are three subtypes within the short draw technique, depending on which hand is active. In forward short draw, the hand closest to the wheel is the active hand. The passive hand stays in the same place throughout, gently holding the fibers fanned out into a triangle shape known as the drafting triangle. The active hand moves forward as it pulls fibers from the drafting triangle, and then back as it allows twist into the newly created yarn. Generally about an inch of fibers are pulled from the drafting technique, much less than the fiber length. While drafting (pulling the fibers from the drafting triangle) the twist is kept out of the yarn, and is only allowed in as the active hand moves back towards the passive one. The twist is never allowed to get between the active and the passive hand. When the active hand is back at the distance of the staple length from the passive, the whole technique repeats.

In backwards short draw, the hand closest to the wheel is the passive hand. It pinches new fibers, but these are drawn out by the other hand, the one farther from the wheel, as it moves backwards. Once the fibers are all drawn out, the active hand is moved forward, and twist is allowed into the new yarn as it passes through the passive hand.

The difference between backwards and forwards short draw is simply which hand is active. In each, one hand is active, and the other is passive. The combination short draw is simply a combination of the other two, with both hands being both active and passive, depending on the moment.

== Preparation ==
Traditional preparation for short draw spinning is combing, as combing requires the long stapled fibers preferred for the short draw technique, and it also leaves the fibers parallel, which is a characteristic of short draw spun yarns. The combed fiber can then be drafted to form a sliver or roving (if the fibers are twisted slightly after drafting, it is called a roving—if not, it is a sliver), or spun directly.

The short draw technique can be done from carded rolags, as well, but this does not produce a strictly worsted yarn. Yarns spun from a rolag will not have all the fibers parallel to the yarn though, with the short draw technique, many will be. Drum carded fiber, however, does have the fibers all parallel to each other, and thus can be used to create a strictly worsted yarn.

== In use ==
Short draw is one of, if not the first method that a handspinner will learn when they learn to spin. It is simpler, and requires less confidence and practice to create an even yarn, than the long draw technique. However, many handspinners will use a combination of short draw and long draw techniques. For example, it is common for a handspinner to allow the twist to get between the two hands, as is done in long draw. Though the spinner may follow the short draw technique in all other points, this is not technically short draw, and doesn't have a commonly recognized name of its own. Short draw is much more widespread in its use than long draw, as many spinners do not know how to use the long draw technique.

The lack of elasticity in short draw spun yarns make them perfect for weaving, especially for the warp. It makes them less desirable for knitting in general, as the yarn doesn't fluff up and fill out the stitch, though it does make for good stitch definition.

The original spinning machinery was based on the short draw technique. Instead of an active and passive hand, the drafting was done by two sets of rollers moving at different speeds. However, the short draw characteristics remain: the fibers in the resulting yarn are all parallel, and there is no twist in the drafting area. Even in the modern day, many spinning machines are based on this principle.
