= Long draw =

Drafting technique used with short-staple yarns in hand spinning

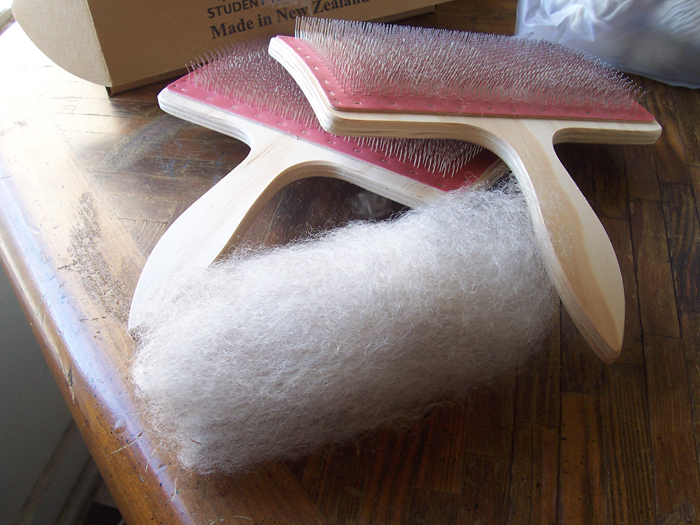
A rolag- the starting point of a woolen yarn, which is spun with the long draw technique

Long draw is the spinning technique used to create woolen yarns. It is spun from carded rolags. It is generally spun from shorter stapled fibers. Long draw spun yarns are light, lofty, stretchy, soft, and full of air, thus they are good insulators, and make good knitting yarns.

Long draw spinning is most often contrasted to the short draw technique used to spin worsted yarns.

== Technique ==
The first step to spin a true woolen yarn is to card the fiber into a rolag using handcarders.

The rolag is spun without much stretching of the fibers from the cylindrical configuration. The hand holding the fiber is the active hand, and the one closer to the wheel is passive. The passive hand smooths yarn, picks out vegetable matter, and pulls out extra bits of fluff, but that is all. The work of drafting is done by the active hand, and most of the regulation and smoothing of yarn is done by twist and tension.

Drafting is done by pinching off a short section of the rolag, and then pulling back while twist is added to it. The active hand pulls back until the yarn is the desired thickness. The passive hand controls how much twist is allowed in the drafting yarn: too much twist and the yarn won't draft; too little and the yarn will break. Twist concentrates in the thin areas of the yarn, solidifying these. Thus the tension doesn't stretch these parts thinner, but instead drafts the thicker parts until all the yarn is approximately the same thickness. This has the effect of automatically thinning out the thicker parts, which is what allows this technique to work.

Once the yarn is the desired thickness, enough twist is added to make the yarn strong. In effect, this is done by releasing the passive hand. Next the yarn is wound onto the bobbin, and the process starts again.

== In use ==
Most handspinners make a blend of a woolen and worsted yarn, using techniques from both categories, and thus ending up with a mix, named a semi-worsted yarn.
