= Woolen =

Textile made of soft carded wool

Woolen (American English) or woollen (Commonwealth English) is a type of yarn made from carded wool. Woolen yarn is soft, light, stretchy, and full of air. It is thus a good insulator, and makes a good knitting yarn. Woolen yarn is in contrast to worsted yarn, in which the fibers are combed to lie parallel rather than carded, producing a hard, strong yarn.

== Commercial manufacture ==
The woolen and worsted process both require that the wool (and other similar animal fibres, cashmere, camel, etc.) be cleaned before mechanical processing. Woolen and worsted nomenclatures apply only to the textile processing of animal fibres, but it has become common to include fibre blends under these terms.

The resultant fabrics will be classified as being either woolen or worsted, but this designation is assigned during fiber processing and yarn formation, not in the cloth or finished garment.

A woven woolen fabric is one which is subjected to fabric finishing techniques designed to add a directional pile — in that the end consumer can 'stroke' the garment in a single direction (shoulder to cuff etc.), such as a casual jacket. This feels like the fibers are directionally arranged.

Woolen yarn formation is also very common for knitwear, where the resultant garment has some bulk and the requirement for visual aesthetics (of fibre alignment) is minimal.

The worsted processing route is more complex and requires the removal of short fibres and the use of a focused mechanical process to make the individual fibres parallel to each other. The yarn formation process is significantly more comprehensive and results in a very sleek yarn which will offer a clean looking woven fabric, such as for suitings. The worsted process is more expensive and is seldom used for knitwear.

== Handspinning woolen yarn ==
Woolen yarn is handspun using the long draw technique, and the yarn is spun from a rolag. Most handspinners make a blend of a woolen and worsted yarn, using techniques from both categories, and thus ending up with a mix. The first step to spin a true woolen yarn, however, is to card the fiber into a rolag using handcarders.

The rolag is spun without much stretching of the fibers from the cylindrical configuration. This is done by allowing twist into a short section of the rolag, and then pulling back, without letting the rolag change position in your hands, until the yarn is the desired thickness. The twist will concentrate in the thinnest part of the roving, thus when the yarn is pulled, the thicker sections with less twist will tend to thin out. Once the yarn is the desired thickness, enough twist is added to make the yarn strong. Then the yarn is wound onto the bobbin, and the process starts again.

== See also ==
- Woollen industry in Ireland
- Woollen industry in Wales
- Anabasse, a coarse woolen material, a kind of blanket made in France and the Netherlands for the African market.
- Durants, a glazed woolen materials of the 18th century.
- Medley cloth, a woolen cloth made with mixed dyed fleece in two or more colors.
