= Rolag =

Roll of fibre generally used to spin woollen yarn

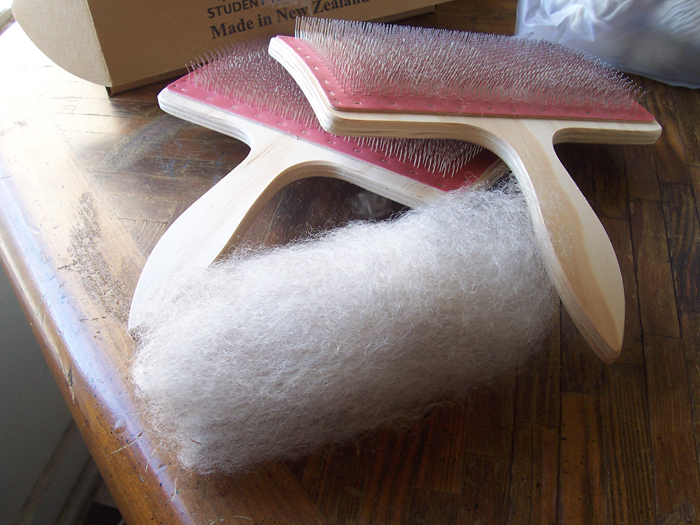
A rolag prepared using handcarders.

A rolag (Scottish Gaelic: roileag) is a roll of fibre generally used to spin woollen yarn. A rolag is created by first carding the fibre, using handcards, and then by gently rolling the fibre off the cards. If properly prepared, a rolag will be uniform in width, distributing the fibres evenly. The word derives from the Scottish Gaelic word for a small roll.

Animal fibres have traditionally been used to create rolags, but today's spinners use many different fibre materials, including manufactured and plant fibres.
