= Ciud-siorraig =

Yarn spinning tool

The ciud-siorraig was a kind of wool winder, with an arrangement of toothed wheels, worked by the revolving winder, and with a spring which makes a sound when the number of threads forming a "cut" is wound around the rim of the winder wheel.

== See also ==
- Crois-iarna
- Niddy noddy
- Spinners weasel
- Swift (textiles)
