= Crois-iarna =

The Crois-iarna ('iron cross') within the textile arts, was a kind of hank reel for yarn. It was a rudimentary form of the ciud-siorraig. It consisted of a stick of a certain length, with a cross piece at each end, set at right angles to each other. The yarn is coiled on the cross pieces of the spool of the spinning wheel, so many threads or turns around the cross pieces, which threads are counted, make an old yard of cloth, i.e. 46 inches of a constant width such as the loom in use suffices to weave. It was found in Uist.

== See also ==
- Niddy noddy
- Spinners weasel
- Swift (textiles)
