= Iron Cross (disambiguation) =

The Iron Cross was a military decoration in the Kingdom of Prussia, German Empire, and Nazi Germany.

Iron Cross also may refer to:

== Fictional characters ==
- Iron Cross, a Marvel Comics character
- Iron Cross, a character in the Aryan Brigade of DC Comics

== Film ==
- The Iron Cross, a 1914 German silent film
- Cross of Iron, a 1977 war film directed by Sam Peckinpah
- Iron Cross (film), a 2009 British thriller

== Gaming ==
- Close Combat: Cross of Iron, a computer game
- Hearts of Iron II: Iron Cross a computer game

== Music ==
- Iron Cross (American band), an American punk rock band
- Iron Cross (Burmese band), a rock band in Myanmar
- Iron Cross, a guitar of Metallica member James Hetfield

== Sports ==
- Iron Cross (exercise), a gymnastics skill
- Cattle catch or iron cross, a type of spinal lock
- Iron Cross (aerial ski trick), an aerial ski trick associated with Jonny Moseley

== Other uses ==
- Iron Cross (Belgium), a combat award of the Kingdom of Belgium
- Iron Cross (secret society), a society at the University of Wisconsin-Madison
- Iron Cross, Warwickshire, a place in England
- Oxalis tetraphylla or Iron Cross, a plant
- Crois-iarna or iron cross, a kind of hank reel, or wool winder

== See also ==
- Cross of Iron (disambiguation)
