= Cross of Iron (disambiguation) =

Cross of Iron may refer to:

- Cross of Iron, a 1977 war film.
  - The Willing Flesh, the novel that Cross of Iron is based on, later editions retitled to match the film
- Close Combat: Cross of Iron, a 2007 remake of Close Combat 3 by Matrix games.
- Cross of Iron, the original title of Swedish black metal band Marduk's tenth studio album, ROM 5:12.
- Cross of Iron, an expansion of the 1979 tactical level board wargame Squad Leader.
- "Cross of Iron", a 1953 speech by Dwight Eisenhower warning against overwhelming defense expenditures and the arms race.

== Related titles ==
- Iron Cross (disambiguation)
