= Niddy-noddy =

Hand reel used to skein and measure yarn

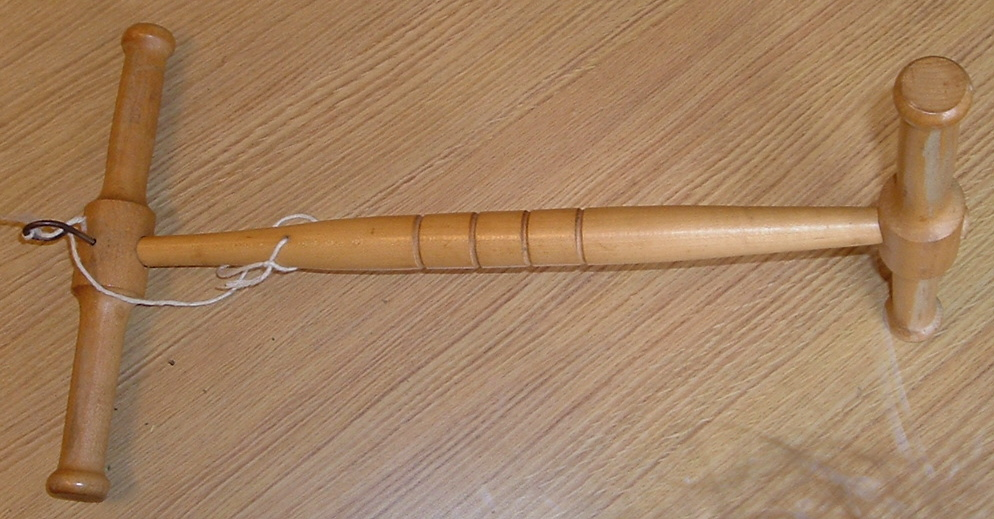
Niddy-noddy with a removable crossbar

A niddy-noddy is a tool used to make skeins from yarn. It consists of a central bar, with crossbars at each end, offset from each other by 90°. The central bar is generally carved to make it easier to hold. Either one of the crossbars will have a flat edge to allow the skein to slide off, or will be completely removable. Niddy-noddies can be constructed of many different materials including wood, metal, and plastic. Wood is traditional, and most quality niddy-noddies are still made of wood. Budget spinners occasionally use niddy-noddies made from PVC pipes.

Manufactured niddy-noddies can be made of different sizes, producing skeins from 12 inches (30 cm) in length to 4 feet (120 cm) in length. The most common size, however, produces a two-yard skein. Very small niddy-noddies are generally used for small samples. Many spinners will spin a sample length of yarn, ply it, and skein it using a niddy-noddy before washing. Then the spinner can see if the yarn is as desired or not.

By counting the number of wraps for the skein, and measuring the length of one wrap, the approximate yardage can be calculated. The yardage is approximate because an exact yardage requires an even tension throughout wrapping the whole skein. Also, a very large skein requires wrapping the new layers on top of the old, which increases the length of the top layers.

A niddy-noddy is held by the Christ Child in Leonardo da Vinci's Madonna of the Yarnwinder, owned by the Duke of Buccleuch and currently on loan to the Scottish National Gallery in Edinburgh.

== Use ==
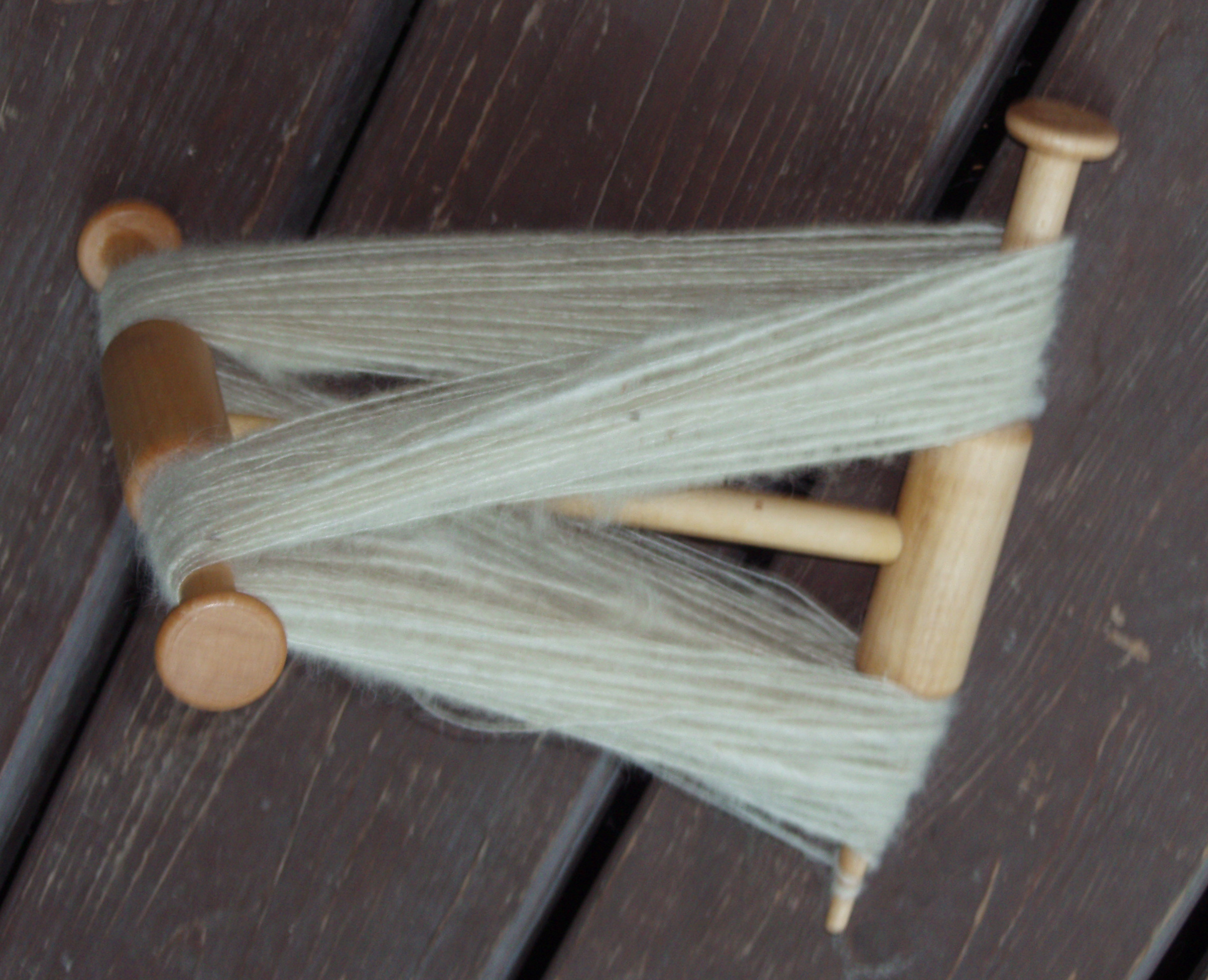
Niddy-noddy with skein of white wool

Generally yarn is skeined directly after spinning or plying. This is because after spinning or plying the yarn generally gets washed, and a skein is the best form to have the yarn in for washing. Although balls are easier for knitters and crocheters to use because they do not get tangled as easily, yarn is sometimes taken from a ball and reskeined in order to measure the yardage of leftover yarn, store it without tension, or to wash out kinks if the yarn was unraveled.

When skeining from wheel spun yarn, the bobbin can either be removed from the wheel and placed on a lazy kate, or skeined directly from the wheel. If the bobbin is left on the wheel the tension on the drive band must be lessened in order to allow the bobbin to turn freely. Yarn spun on spindles can either be left on the spindle, or slipped onto a dowel for plying. The spindle or dowel is either placed in a lazy kate, or even a bowl to keep the spindle in one place while winding off the yarn.

One end of the yarn is wound around the center piece and held firmly in place, while the rest of it is wrapped. The yarn is then taken over the left end of the top crossbar, down and under the right side of the lower crossbar, up and over the other end of the top crossbar, and then down and under the other end of the lower crossbar before returning to the starting point to complete one wrap. While rather awkward at first, one quickly picks up the rhythm.

This process continues until the whole skein is wound. The time to skein yarn on a niddy-noddy depends on the yardage, and thus how many wraps need to be made. A larger niddy-noddy can speed up the skeining, but a very large one can be bulky, and thus slow down the time to do one wrap. At this point, the skein is secured by loose figure eight knots between each crossbar. This can be done with scrap yarn, or with slip knots from the end of the skein. In either case, loosely securing each end with a slip knot makes it easier to find the ends in the finished skein. Generally 4 or more knots are tied.

Once the yarn has been skeined, it can be dyed or washed to set the twist. Weavers often dry their yarn under tension with a weight at the bottom of the loop, to stretch it out and remove some of the elasticity.

Traditionally the niddy-noddy was used to the rhythm of a song, the opening line of which ran, "Niddy-noddy, niddy-noddy, two heads and one body."

== Other skein winders ==
The closest tools similar to a niddy-noddy are the swift and the spinner's weasel. Some swifts need to be attached to a table, and even folding models tend to be a bit inconvenient to fold and carry, and thus are not as portable as a niddy-noddy. While swifts are useful for holding skeins for balling, they are not as convenient as niddy-noddies for winding skeins, nor are they as useful for calculating length, since expandable swifts do not wrap yarn tightly around a known circumference. The spinner's weasel is also not portable, but measures length more efficiently than a niddy-noddy and can be used while spinning.
