= Swift (textiles) =

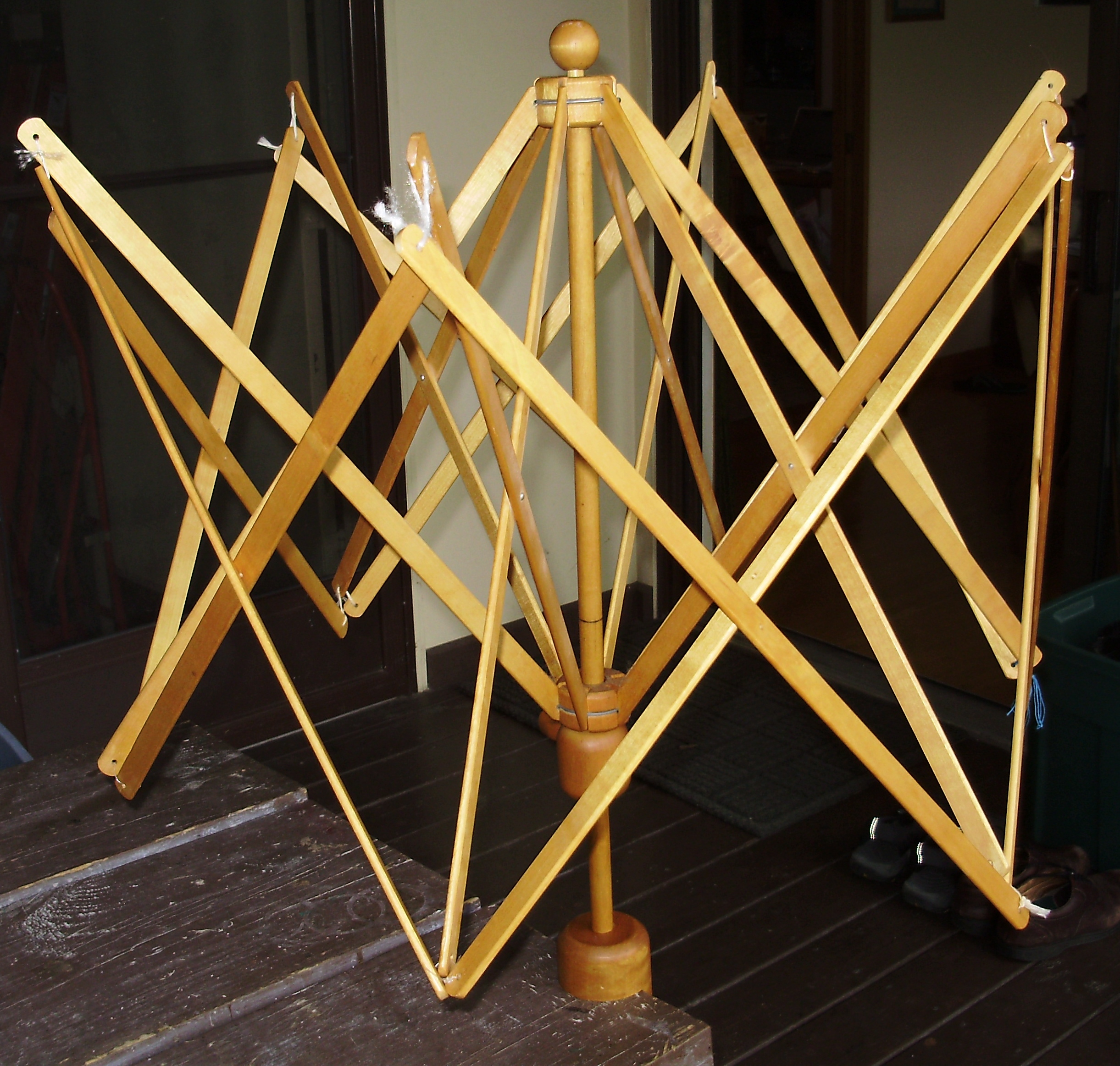
A wooden umbrella swift

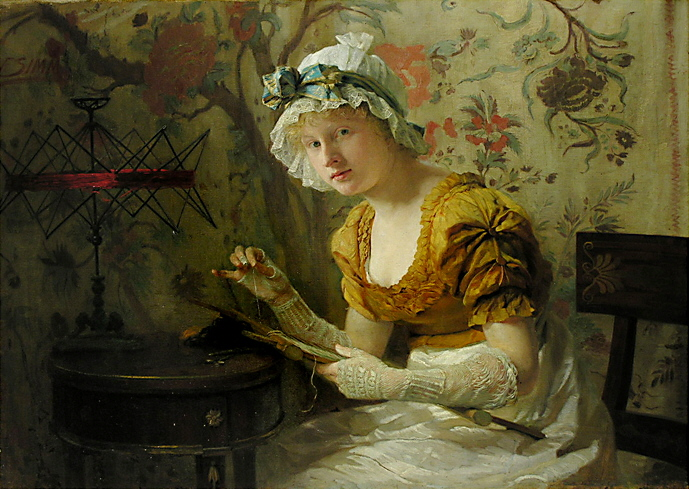
An umbrella swift in the background, holding a skein of red yarn

A swift is a tool used to hold a hank of yarn while it is being wound off (uncoiled from the hank and rewound in a form usable for knitting or crochet). It has an adjustable diameter so that it can hold hanks of many sizes, and rotates around a central rod. Developed in the United States, they are generally made out of wood or metal, though other materials may also be used. In the 18th and 19th centuries, swifts were sometimes made of whale ivory and they are now sought-after antiques. Swifts are not used very much in the textile industry but are used more by knitters and crocheters who buy their yarn in hank form. The swift allows for easy balling without the yarn getting tangled and knotted.

== Typology ==
A swift can be as simple as four rods fixed into an axis, with bands connecting them. By sliding the bands the effective diameter changes, for different sized hanks. However, most swifts are more complicated than this.

The 'umbrella swift' is one of the more common varieties, the advantage of it being that it folds up when not in use. Wooden umbrella swifts are the most common type of swift in use. They are preferred by hand spinners because they fold up, which is good for storage, and they are generally more stable, of higher quality, and look nicer than metal umbrella swifts.

Another type is the 'Amish style' swift, a rotating cross with positionable pegs to adjust for different diameters of hanks.

A spinners weasel is similar to a swift, however it does not adjust to various sized hanks. While today this is a big disadvantage, as different manufacturers don't always make hanks the same size, it was not an issue when all yarn was hand spun. At this time hanks from one spinner would all be the same size, as they would have been made on the same niddy noddy, thus only one diameter was needed.

== Gallery ==
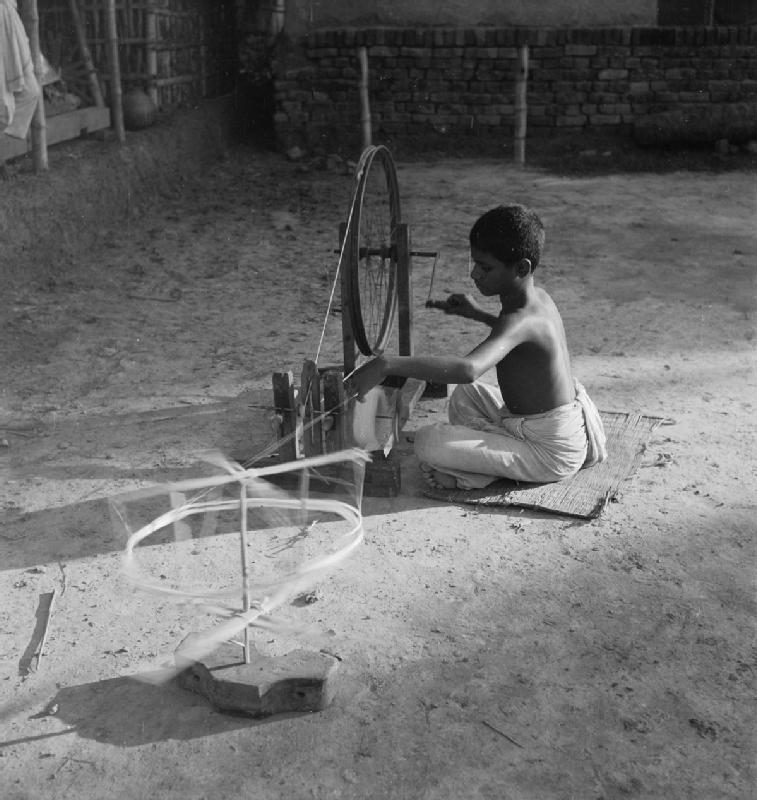
A simple vertical-axis swift, for making multi-ply thread

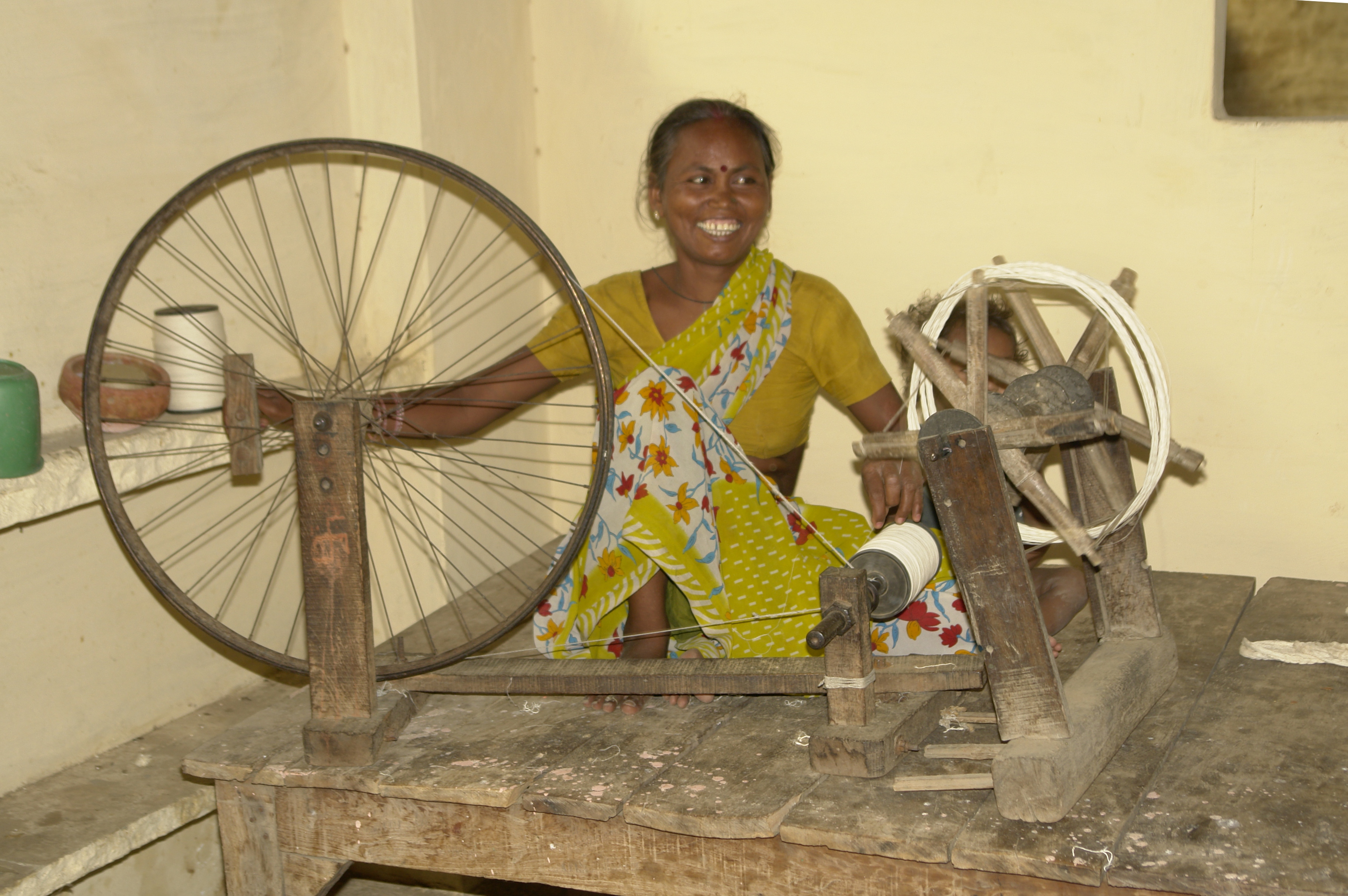
A horizontal-axis swift, the hank borne on a thread that zigzags between spokes

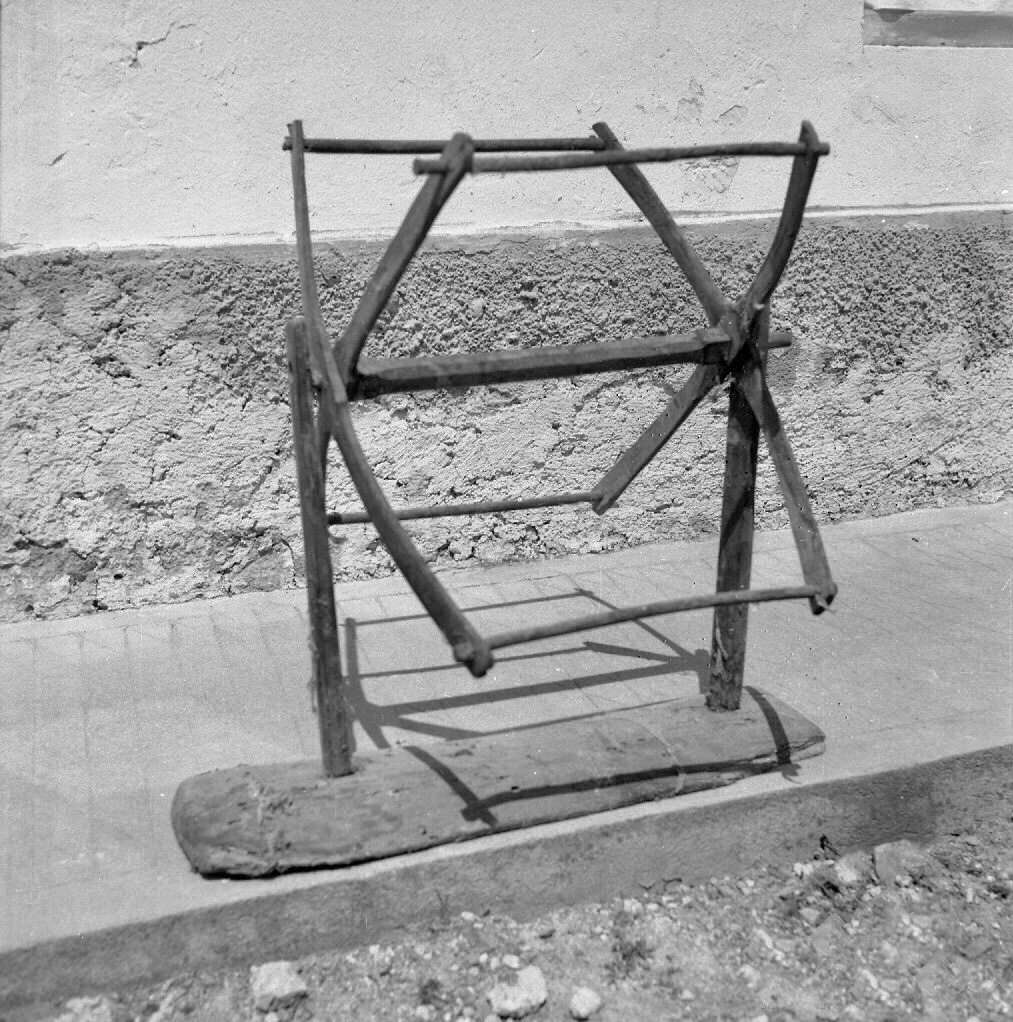
A horizontal-axis swift, the hank borne on horizontal dowels between spokes

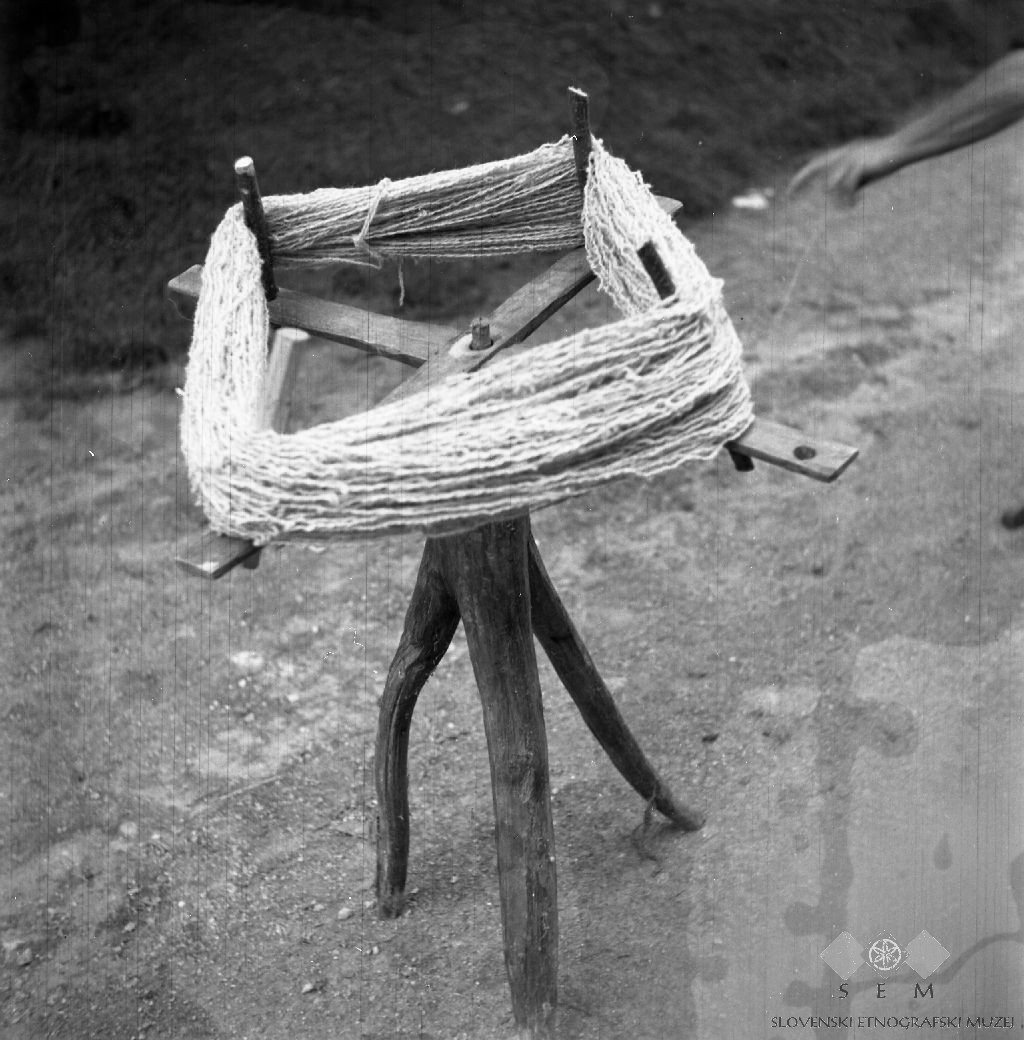
Vertical-axis swift made with a grown tripod base; note hole for adjusting circumference

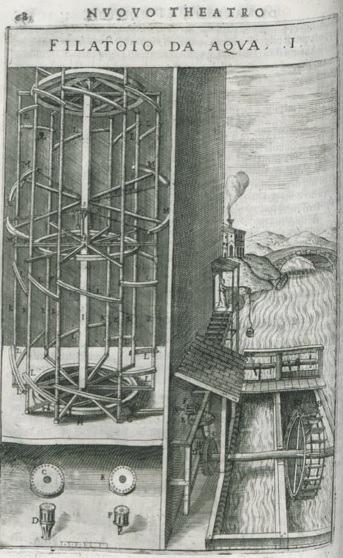
Illustration of a hydraulic spinner from Novo teatro di machine et edificii by Vittorio Zonca, 1607

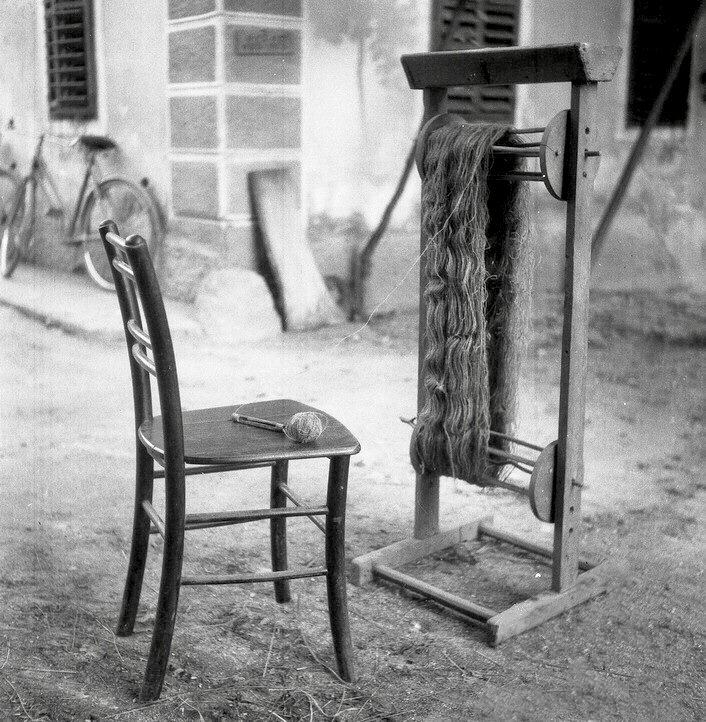
A Slovenian swift

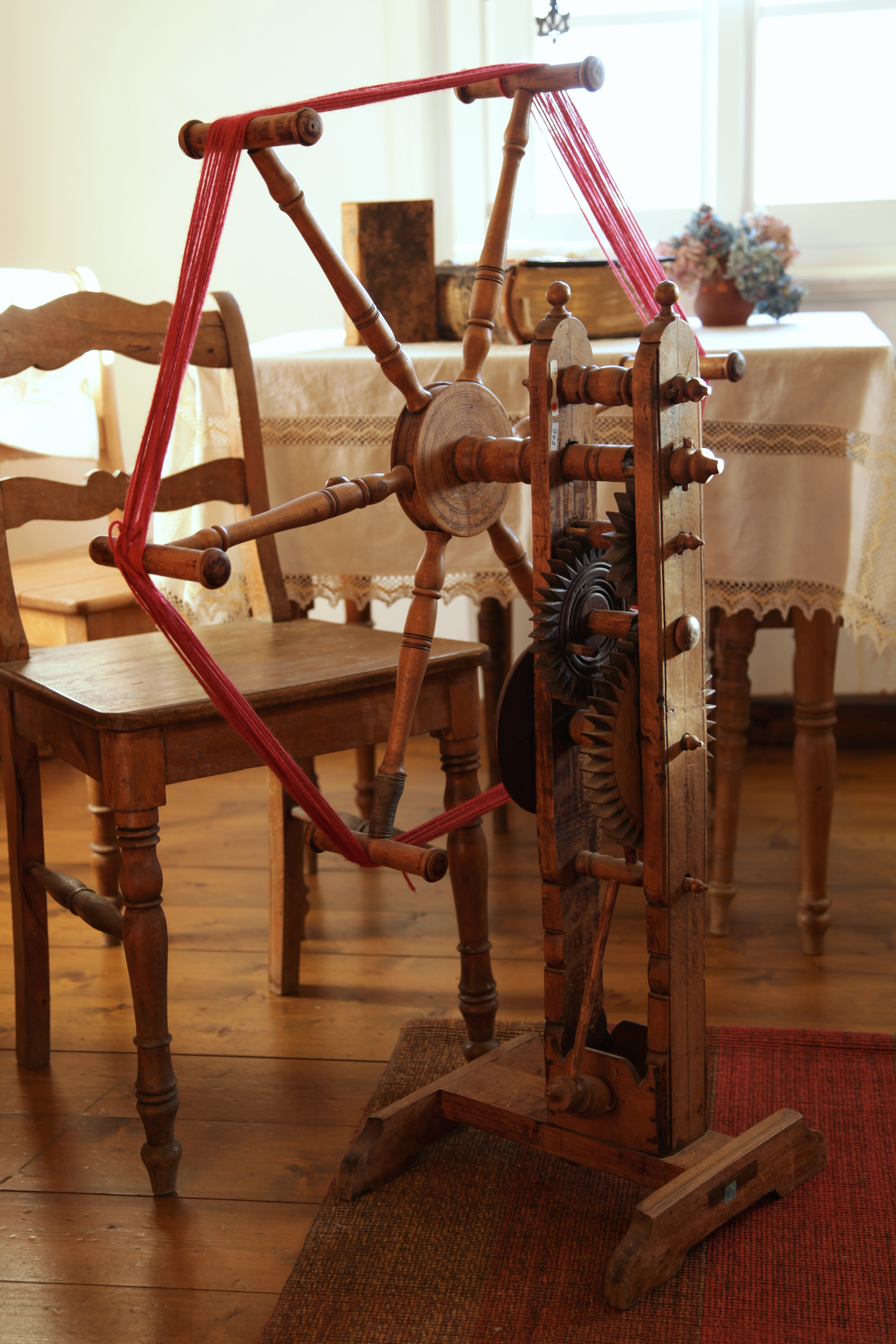
A spinner's weasel, with gearing for counting rotations and thus measuring length.

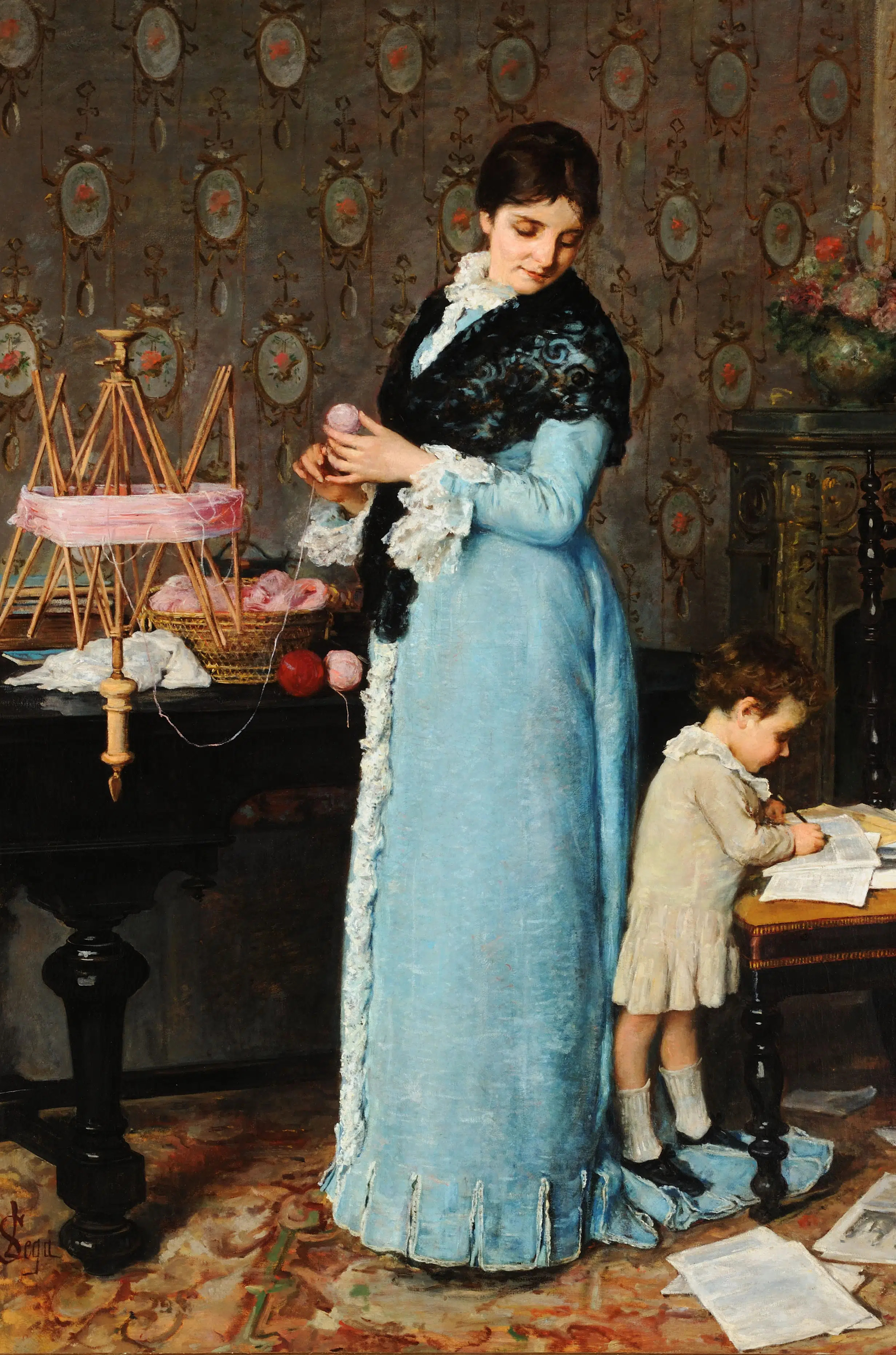
A woman using an umbrella swift, 1884

== Common substitutes ==
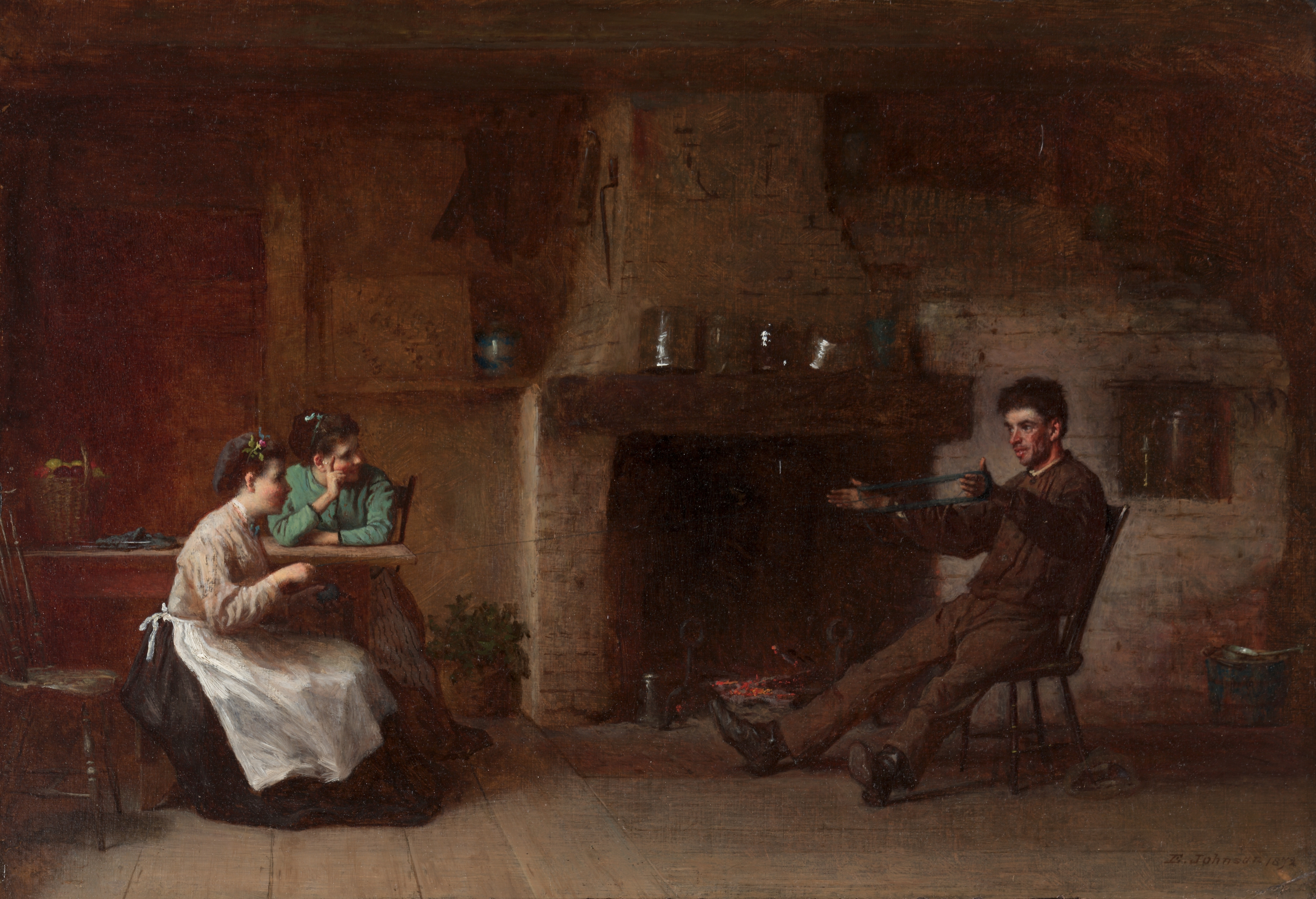
Winding Yarn by Eastman Johnson, 1915

In the modern day spinners' weasels are even less common than swifts.

One substitute for a swift is to have someone else hold the hank. This has several disadvantages however, first a willing second person has to be found, and secondly unless the other person has had a lot of practice holding hanks, the yarn winds off a swift much better. Yarn tends to catch on the hands and wristwatches of the person holding the hank, and a swift has neither hand nor watch to catch the yarn.

Another common substitute is the back of a chair. The disadvantages of this is that the hank is not kept under tension, and thus the yarn has a tendency to get tangled, and one has to stop very often to untangle it.

== Uses ==
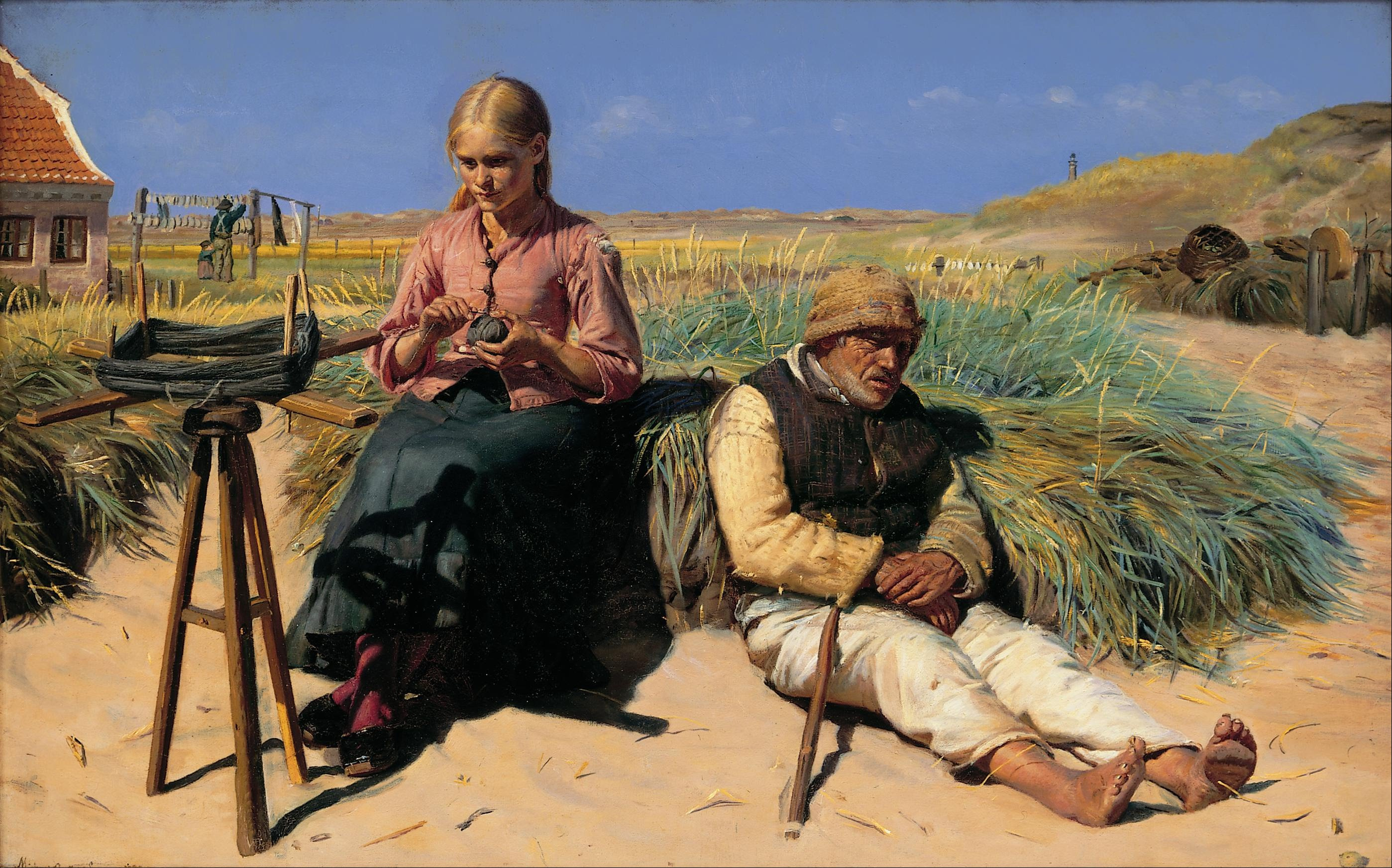
Using a swift to ball a hank

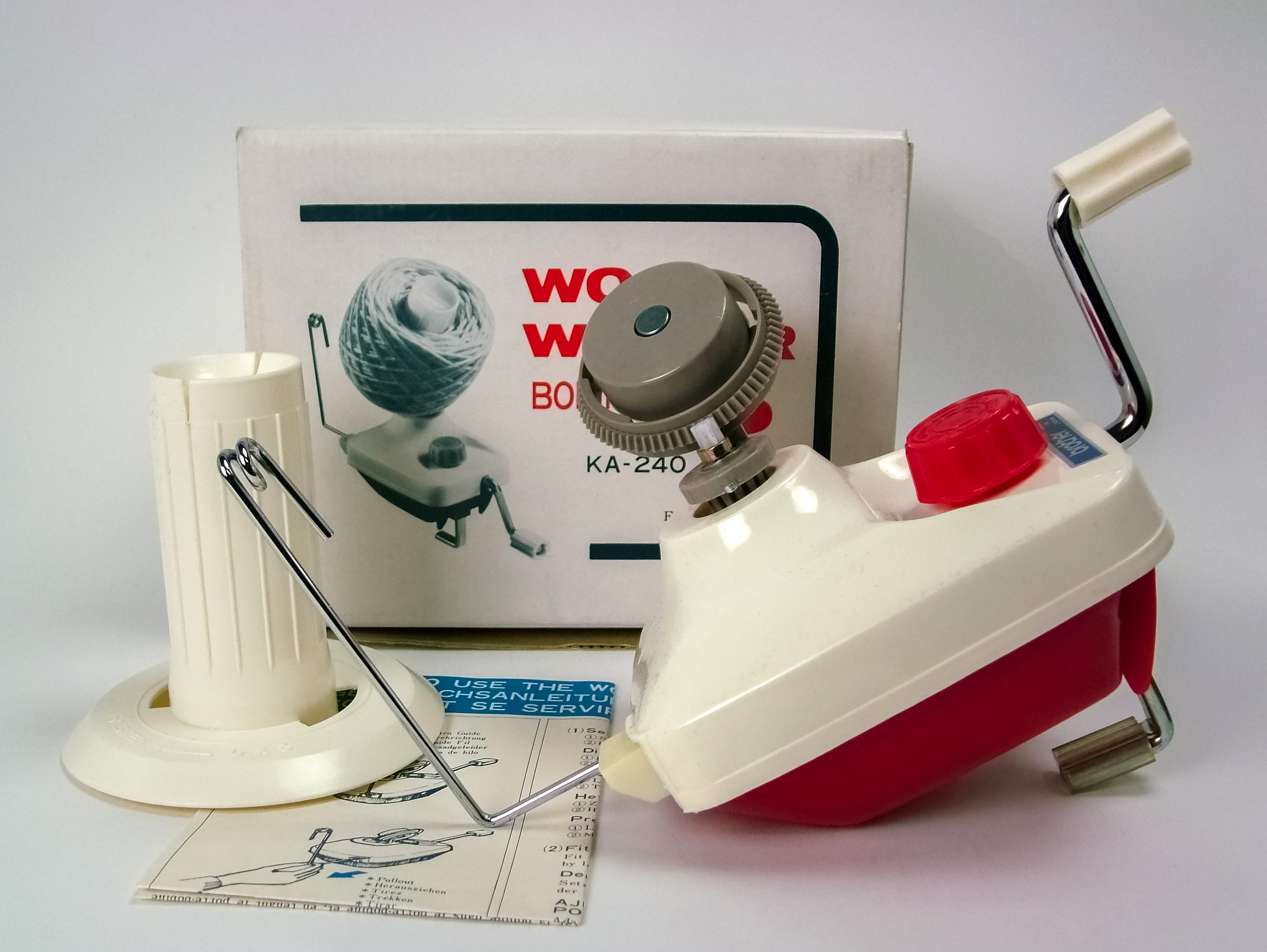
A modern alternative is to use a hand-cranked yarn ball bobbin winder.

Swifts are most commonly used to ball a hank of yarn. An increasing percentage of yarn is sold in hank form, especially hand dyed or hand spun yarns, which necessitates balling for knitters and crocheters. Swifts are also sometimes used by weavers in preparing the warp: if the yarn for the warp comes in a hank, the warp can be wound directly onto the warping board from the swift. As weaving yarns generally come on cones though, this use isn't as prevalent.

== See also ==
- Wrap reel
