= Spinner's weasel =

Device for measuring a length of yarn

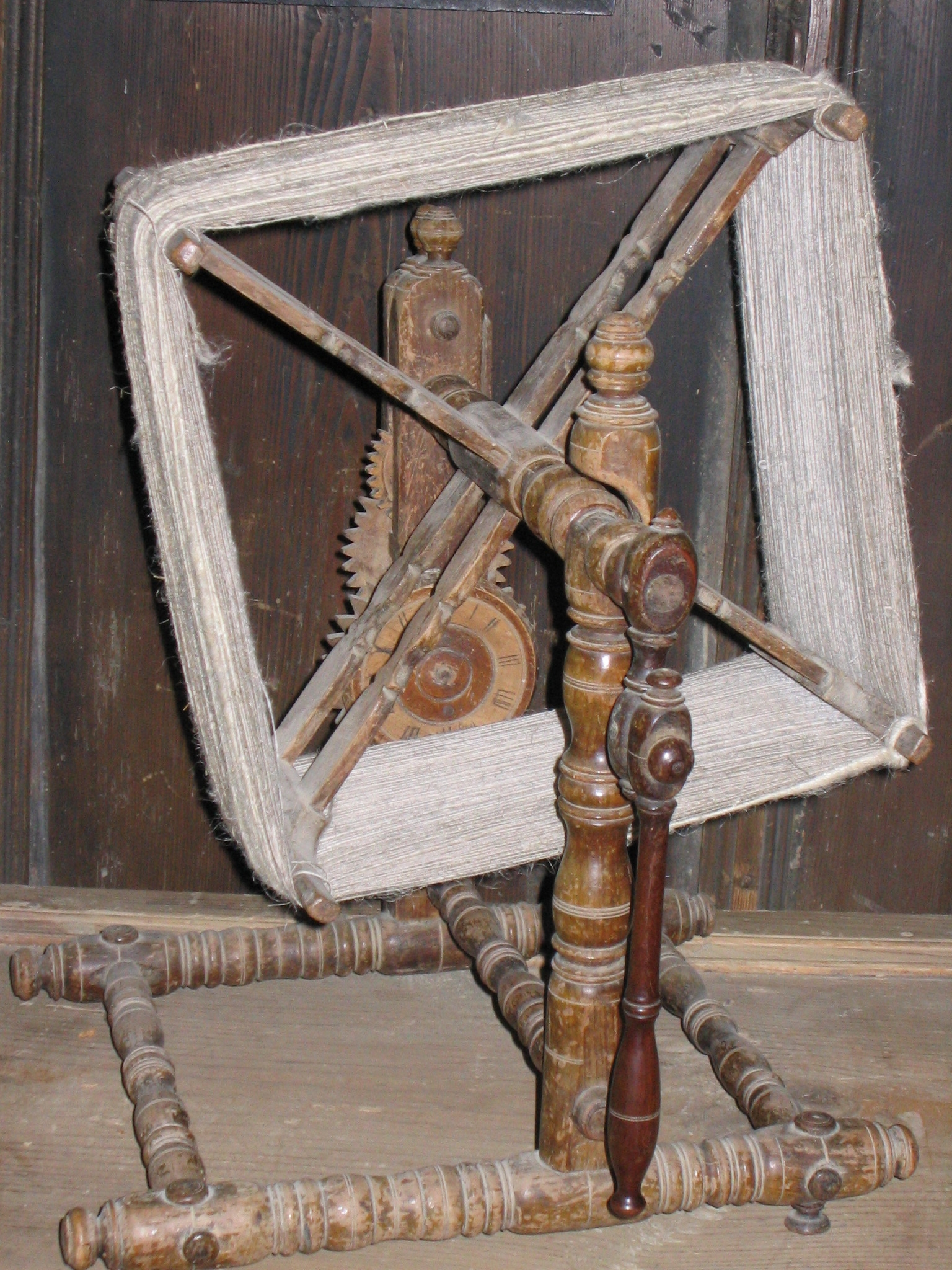

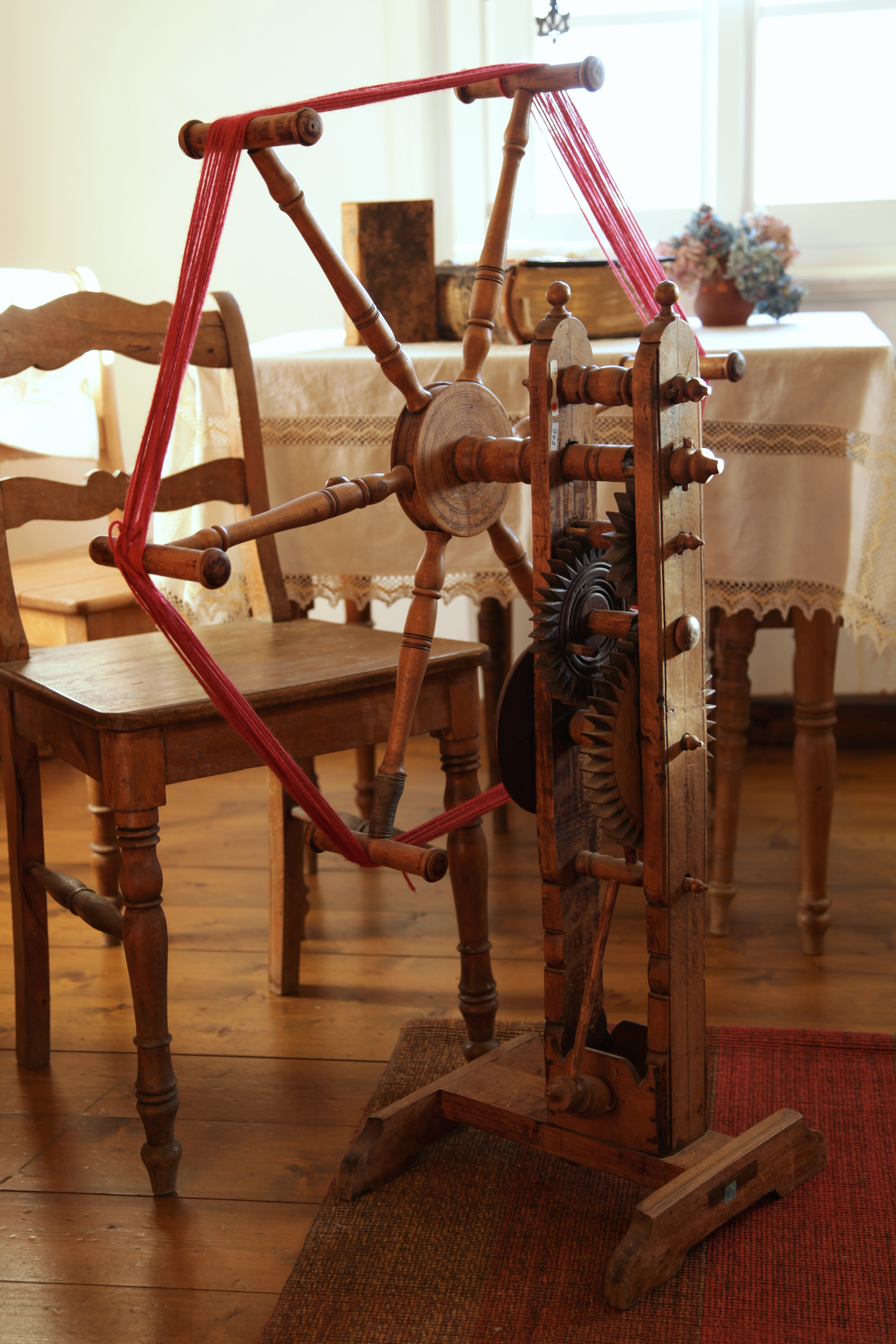
Popping mechanism

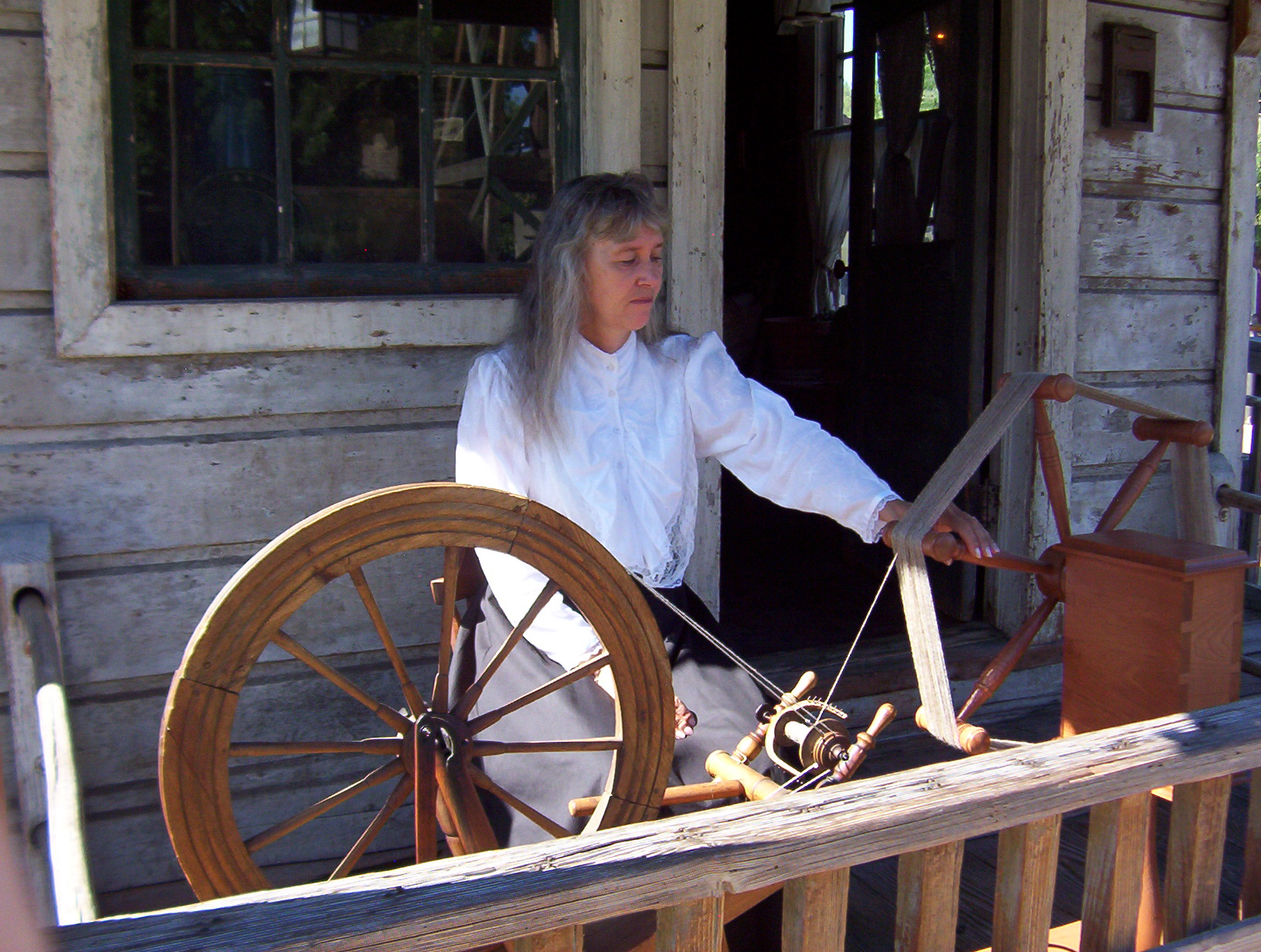
Knott's Berry Farm spinner Charlene Parker demonstrates how to transfer thread or yard from a spinning wheel (on left) to a spinner's weasel (on right).

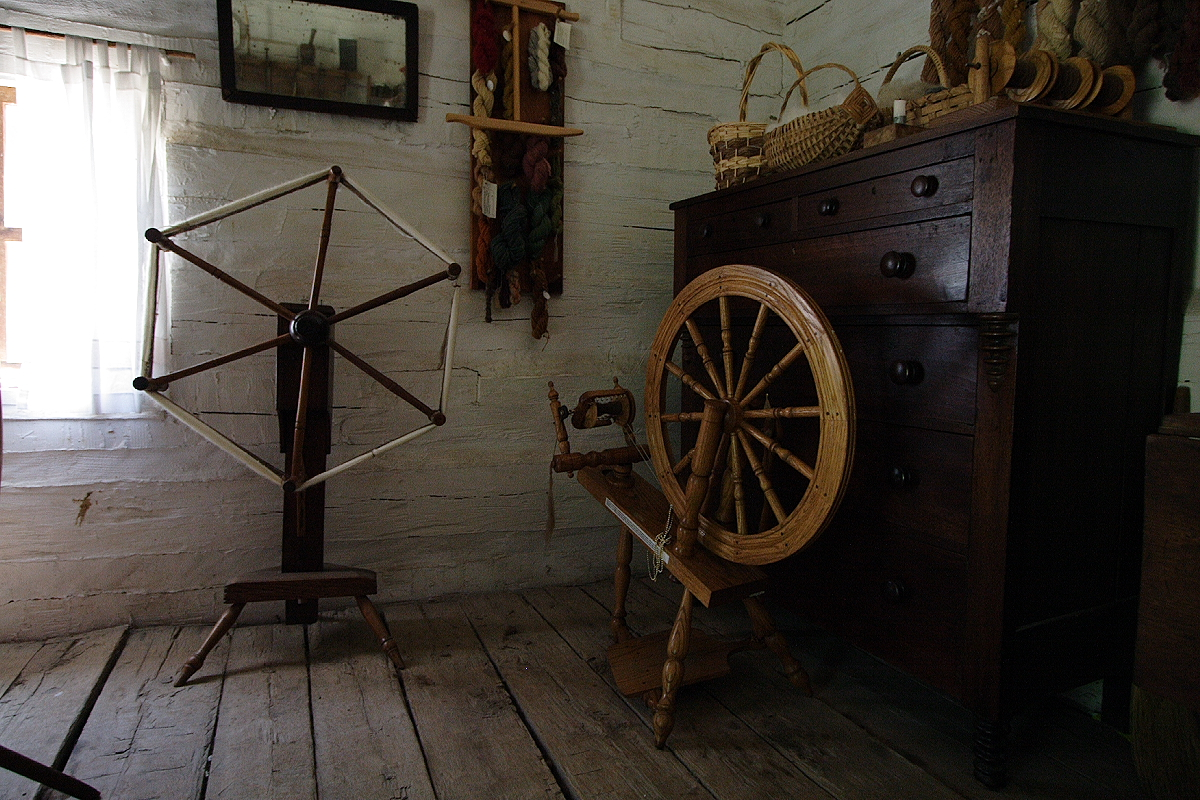
Spinner's weasel (left) and spinning wheel (right)

Spinner's weasel or clock reel is a mechanical yarn-measuring device consisting of a spoked wheel with gears attached to a pointer on a marked face (which resembles a clock) and an internal mechanism that makes a "pop" sound after the desired length of yarn is measured (usually a skein). The pointer allows the spinner to see how close they are to reaching a skein. The weasel's gear ratio is typically 40 to 1, and the circumference of the reel is usually two yards, thus producing an 80-yard skein when the weasel pops (after 40 revolutions).

Some reels or skein winders are made without the gear mechanism (see swift (textiles)). Like weasels, they hold yarn in place and prevent tangles, but without the "clock" or pop to keep track of the length of yarn produced. As a result, swifts are generally used by knitters and crocheters to wind finished yarn into balls or cakes, rather than by spinners to measure it. A niddy noddy is an even simpler tool for measuring length. The wrap reel, on the other hand, is even more complex, with a mechanism for standardizing the tension.

The clock reel is a possible source for the word "weasel" in the nursery rhyme Pop Goes the Weasel.
