= Plying =

Twisting two or more single strands of yarn together to produce stronger yarn

In the textile arts, plying (from the French verb plier, "to fold", from the Latin verb plico, from the ancient Greek verb πλέκω.) is a process of twisting one or more strings (called strands or plies) of yarn together to create a stronger yarn. Strands are twisted together in the direction opposite that in which they were spun. Plied yarns will not unravel, break, or degrade as easily as unplied yarns. When enough twist is added to the plies to counter the initial twist of each strand, the resulting yarn is "balanced", having no tendency to twist upon itself.

The number of strands used to make the yarn is usually the same as the number of plies it has. Two-ply yarn means two strands were used, three-ply yarn means three strands were used, etc. Embroidery floss is generally a six-ply yarn, for example. There are some exceptions to this, most notably in chain plying.

== Plying handspun yarns ==
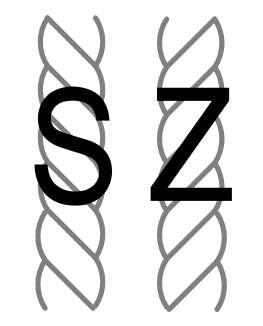
Diagram showing S and Z twist

There are two common ways to ply a balanced yarn: regular and chain plying.

Both methods involve the manipulation of "singles"—unplied strands on their own—into multiple-ply yarns by applying twist in the opposite direction than how the single was spun. For example, if in spinning the single the wheel was spinning clockwise (called a "Z" twist, as on any given side the fibres appear to cross each other like the line in the middle of the letter "Z"), the wheel must spin counter-clockwise (an "S" twist) in order to ply it.

=== Regular plying ===
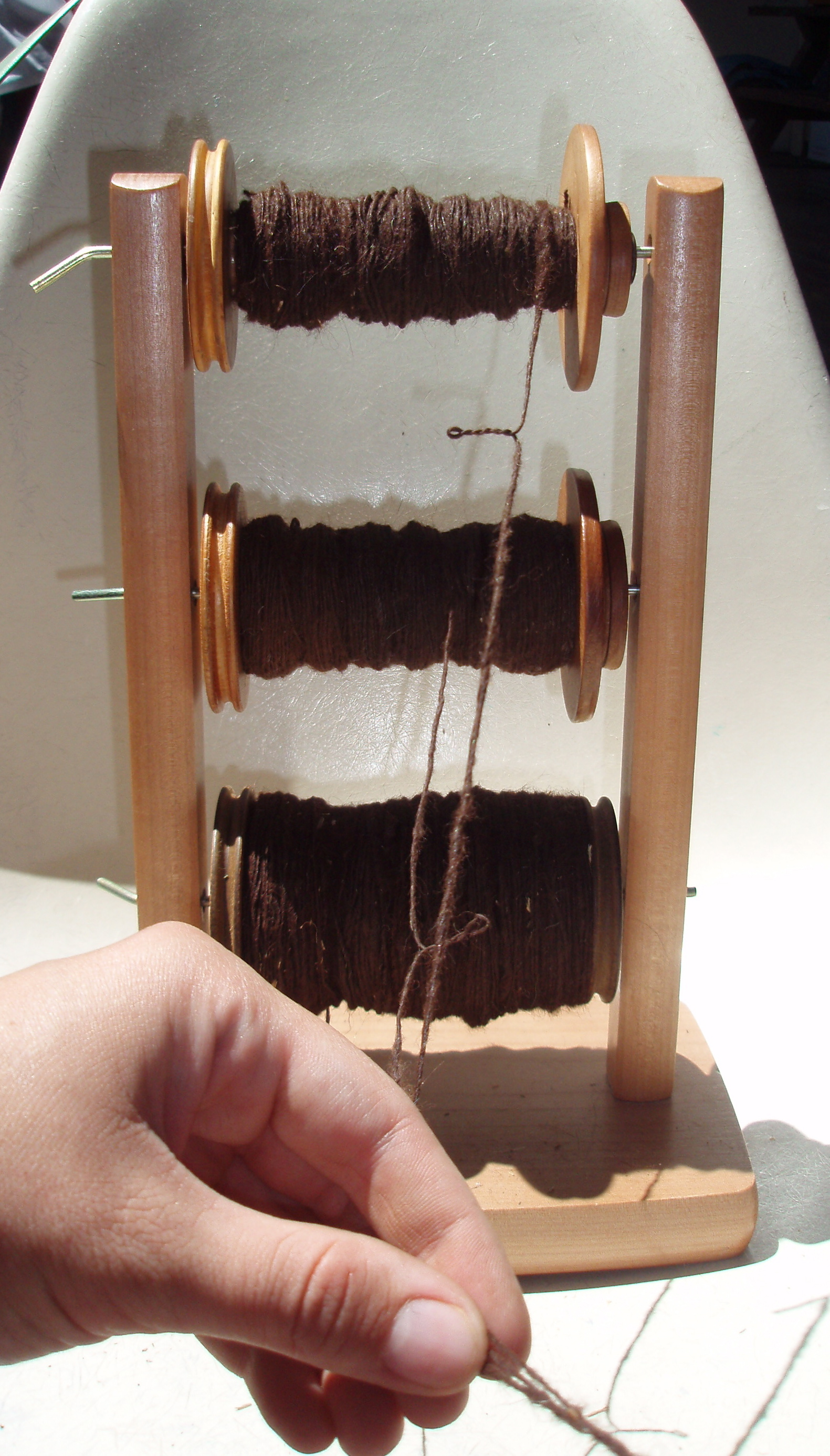
Making a three-ply yarn using bobbins on a lazy kate.

Regular plying consists of taking 2 or more singles and twisting them together. This can be done on either a spinning wheel or a spindle.

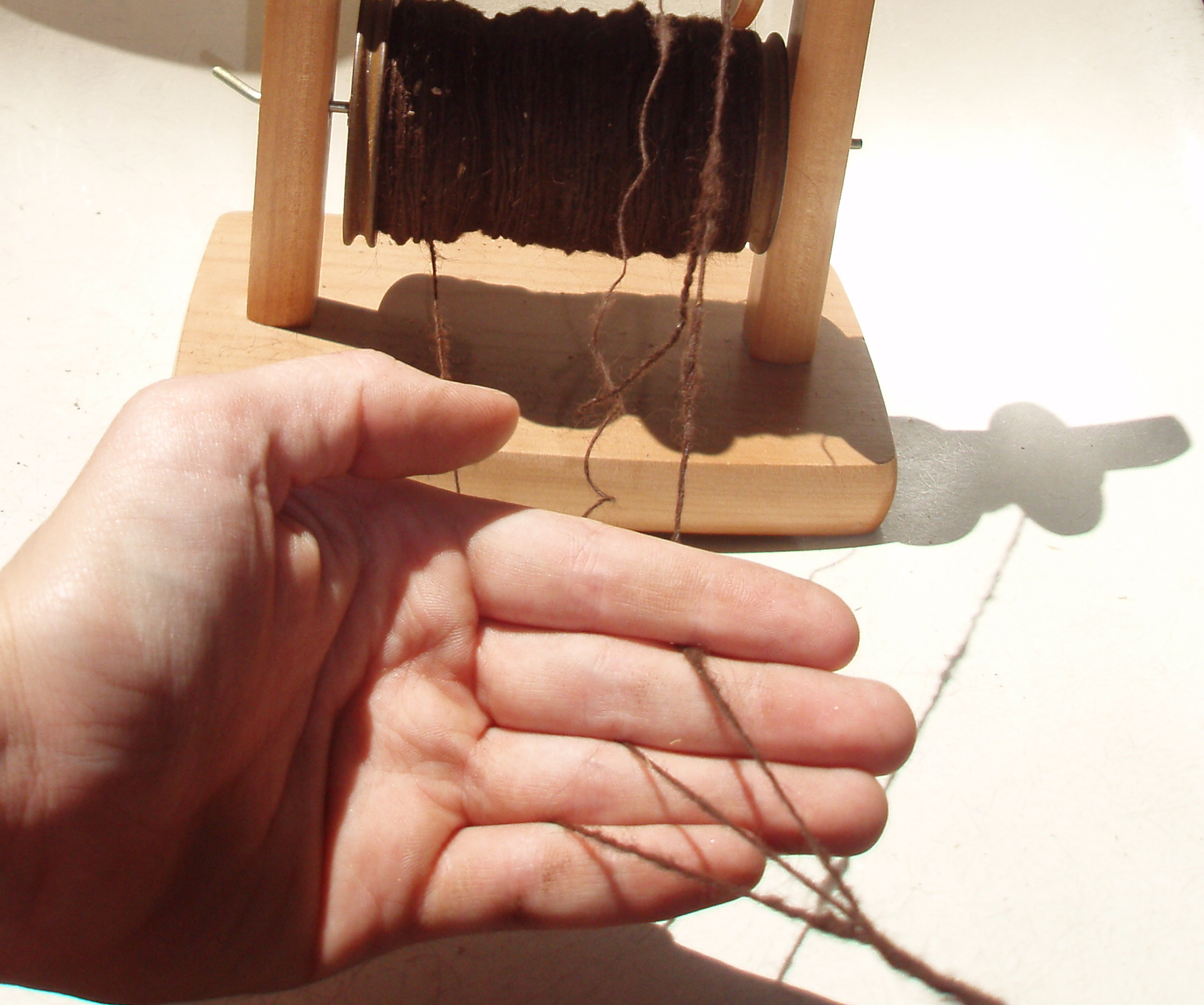
How the singles are held to keep them separate

When plying, the singles are kept separate, either with the fingers or with a tool. This tool can be anything from the top of a salt dispenser, and the singles threaded through the holes, or a specially carved piece of wood with holes in it. The singles are kept separate to ensure that they do not get tangled and so the tension can be controlled.

Most spinners who use spinning wheels ply from bobbins or spools. This is easier than plying from balls because there is less chance for the yarn to become tangled and knotted. So that the bobbins can unwind freely, they are put in a device called a Lazy Kate, or sometimes simply kate. The simplest lazy kate consists of wooden bars with a metal rod running between them. Most hold three or four bobbins. The bobbin sits on the metal rod. Other lazy kates are built with devices that create an adjustable amount of tension, which adds control to how much string is unwound using a given amount of force. Some spinning wheels come with a built-in lazy kate.

On a drop spindle, two-ply is created by placing the spools on a lazy kate, tying the ends together onto the drop spindle, holding equal lengths of singles together and dropping the spindle. The weight of the drop spindle, combined with the twist in the singles, causes the drop spindle to turn in the opposite direction that the singles were twisted in until the two singles are plied together.

=== Chain plying ===
Chain plying (also known as Navajo plying) consists of making large loops, similar to crocheting. Only one single is necessary, and if the single is already dyed, this technique allows it to be plied without changing the color scheme.

The spinner first makes a loop on the end of the leader—the string left on the bobbin, which the new yarn is spun from—that is large enough to slip their hand through. They pull some of the working yarn through the loop. Then the spinner starts applying twist to the three plies, consisting of the two sides of the loop together with the yarn pulled through it. When the loop and the yarn are nearly fully plied together, a new loop of yarn is pulled through the initial loop, and spinning continues. This process is repeated until the yarn is all plied. This technique allows the spinner to try to match up thick and thin spots in the yarn, thus making for a smoother end product.

=== Center-pull ball plying ===
Center-pull ball plying results in yarn similar in appearance to regular plying. However, it doesn’t require a lazy kate or multiple bobbins. It requires a single bobbin and a center-pull ball winder or a nostepinne to create the center-pull ball that is plied with.

Once the ball is wound, the single from both the center and outside are held together, in a similar manner to the regular plying method, then twisted together. This results in a two-ply yarn.

Center-pull ball plying results in one single being more tightly wound than the other, causing a fluffier and looser texture when knit, compared to the regular plying method.

== Machined yarns ==
Machines that ply yarn use the 'regular' method mentioned above. The main difference is that gears control the intake, making sure that the strands all have the same tension and the same length. Other than that, the process for plying is exactly the same as when hand done.

== Novelty yarns ==
Many novelty yarns make use of special plying techniques to gain their special effects. By varying the tension in the strands, or the relative sizes of the strands, or many other factors different effects can be achieved. For example, when a soft, thick strand is plied against a tightly twisted thin strand, the resulting yarn spirals. Another example is bouclé, which is a yarn where one strand is held loosely and allowed to make loops on the other yarn while plying.

== See also ==
- Rope
- Tyre ply

== Bibliography ==
- Abby Franquemont, Respect the Spindle, spin infinite yarns with one amazing tool, Interweave (2009) ISBN 9781596681552, pp100–111.
