= Lazy Kate =

Assistive yarn accessory

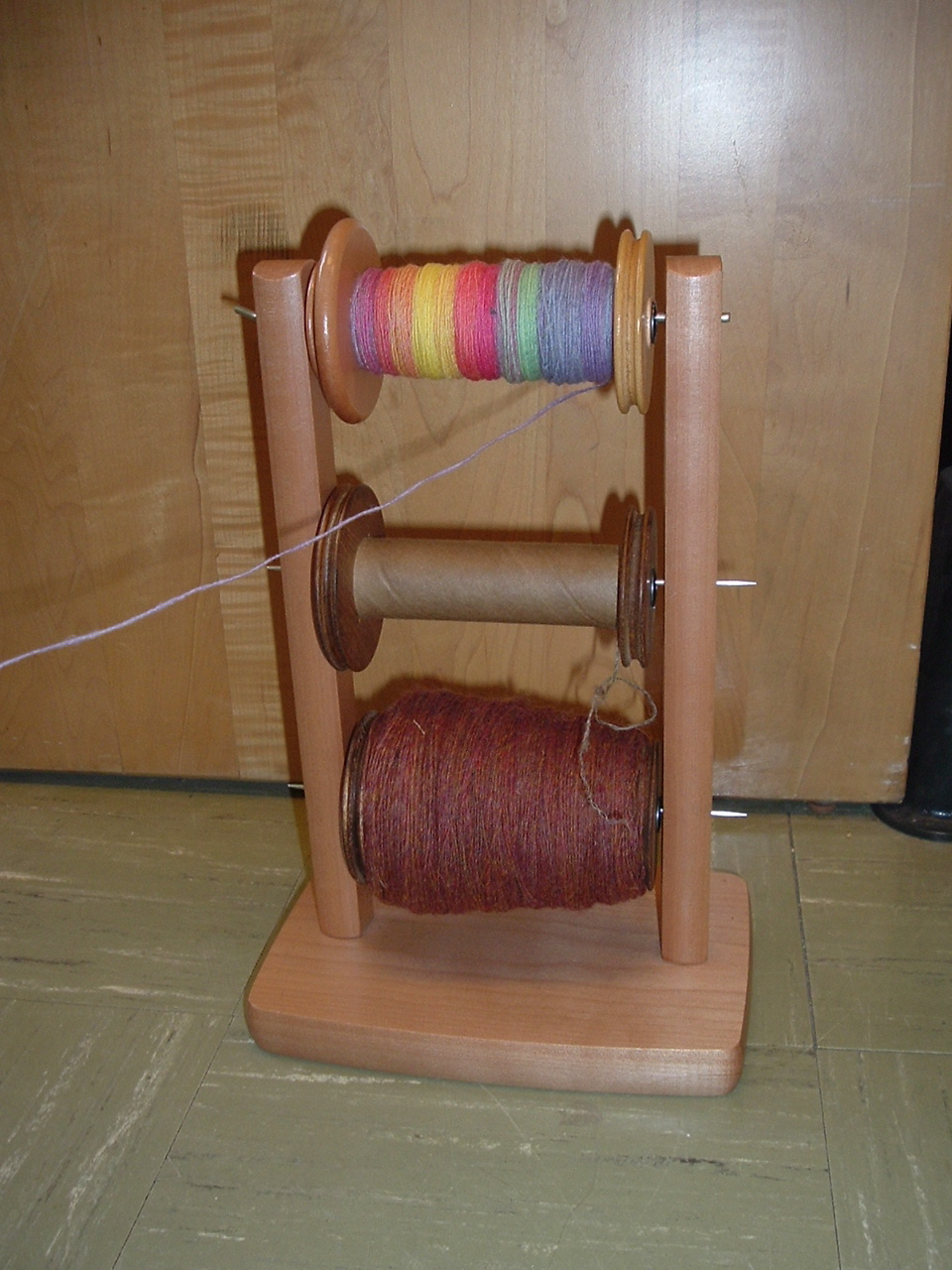
A kate with three bobbins on it

A lazy kate (also simply known as a kate) is a device used in spinning to hold one or more spools or bobbins in place while the yarn on them is wound off from the side of the bobbin. Typically, a kate consists of a standing rack with multiple rods which allow the bobbins placed on them to spin. Tensioned kates have a band that loops over the bobbins to prevent them from spinning freely. Some spinning wheels have built-in kates, although these tend to be more cumbersome to use than free-standing ones.

Kates are commonly used to ply yarn but may be used for any task which involves winding off yarn from a bobbin.

Electricians use a similar device to mount their spools of wire for pulling and storage.

An improvised kate can be created out of a cardboard box pierced by some sort of dowels.

== Resources ==
- Detailed instructions on making your own kate using easily found materials.
