= Hank (unit of measure) =

Textile term; coiled or wrapped unit of yarn or twine

In the textile industry, a hank is a coiled or wrapped unit of yarn or twine, as opposed to other materials like thread or rope, as well as other forms such as ball, cone, bobbin (cylinder-like structure) spool, etc. This is often the best form for use with hand looms, compared to the cone form needed for power looms. Hanks come in varying lengths depending on the type of material and the manufacturer. For instance, a hank of linen is often 300 yards (270 m), and a hank of cotton or silk is 840 yards (770 m).

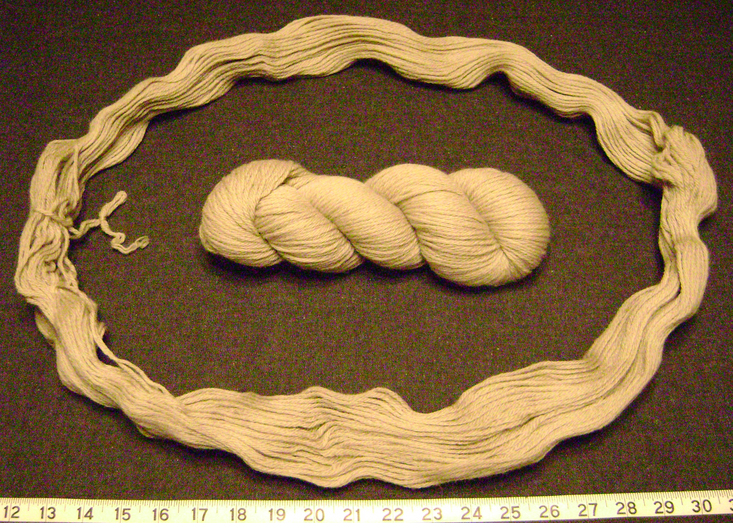
Hanks, twisted and untwisted. The tie typically used to hold the coil together is visible on the left.

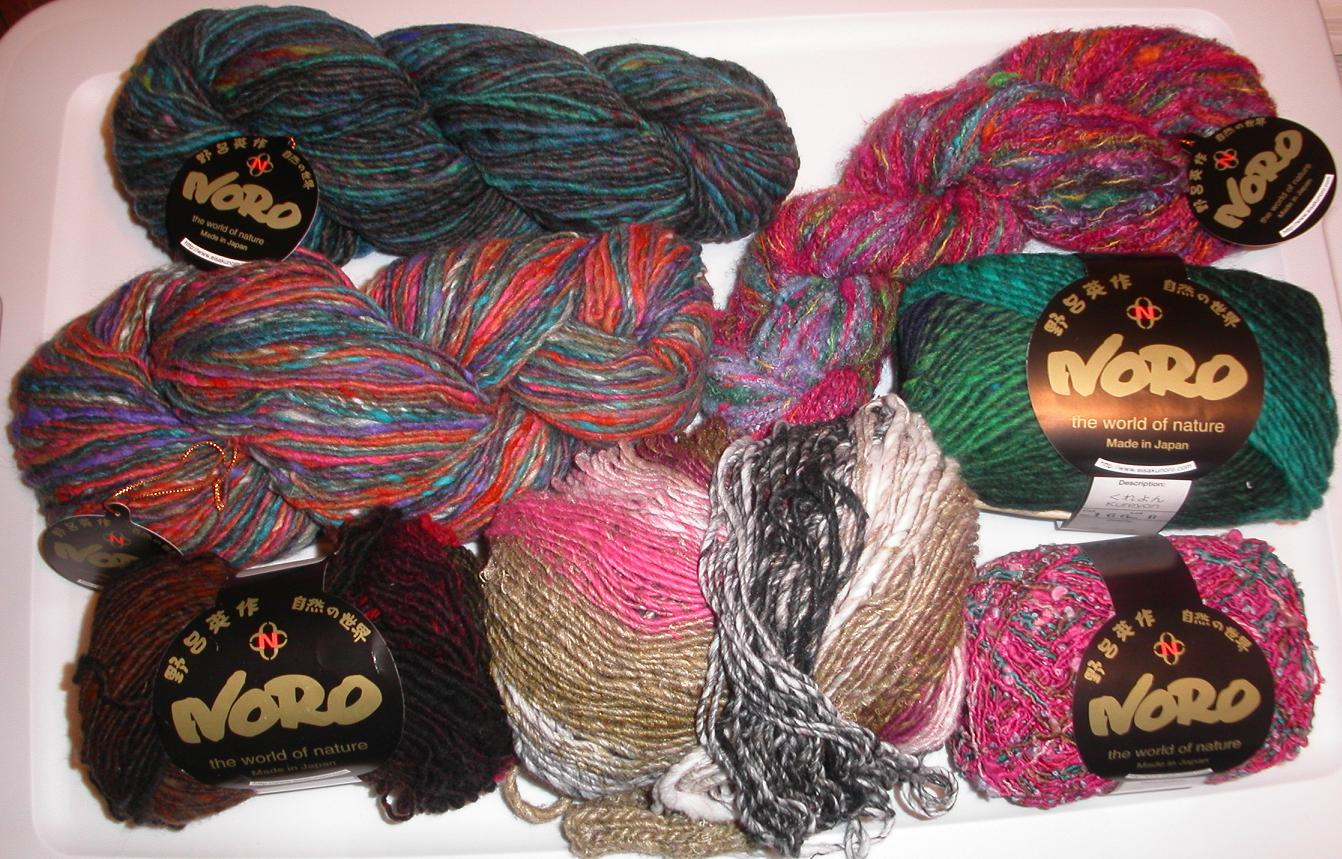
The three uppermost yarns are in hanks.

While hanks may differ by manufacturer and by product, a skein is usually considered 1/6th of a hank (either by weight or by length). One source identifies a skein of stranded cotton as being 8.25 yards (7.54 m), of tapestry wool as being 10 yards (9.1 m), and crewel wool as being 33 yards (30 m).

In yarns for handcrafts, such as knitting or crochet, hanks are not a fixed length but are sold in units by weight, most commonly 50 grams (2 oz). Depending on the thickness of the strand as well as the inherent density of the material, hanks can range widely in yardage per 50 gram (2 oz) unit; for example, 440 yards for a lace weight mohair, to 60 yards for a chunky weight cotton. Special treatments to the materials that add cost, such as mercerisation or labor-intensive hand-painting of colors, can influence a manufacturer's desired length per unit as well. Knitters and crocheters rewind the hanks into balls or centre-pull skeins prior to use, in order to prevent the yarn from becoming tangled.

In the meat industry, a sheep, lamb or hog sausage casing is sold by the hank. This unit of measure equals 100 yards (91 m).

== See also ==
- Spool
