= Jowett Cars =

Defunct English automobile manufacturer

Jowett Cars Ltd
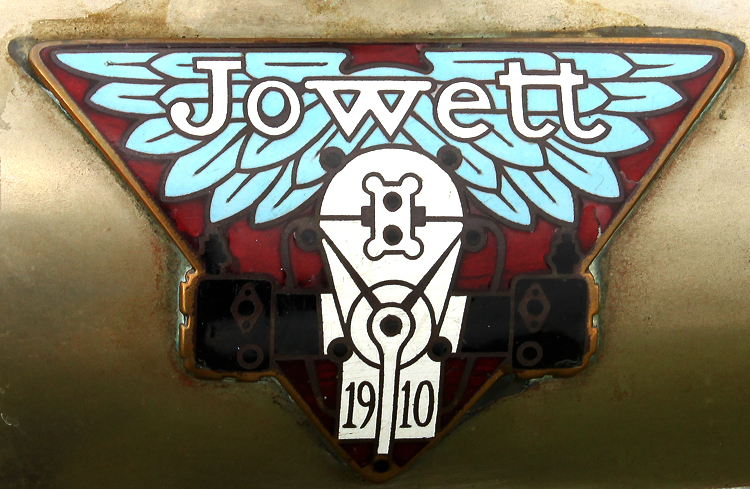
- Industry: Motor cars
- Founded: 1906
- Defunct: 1955 Voluntary Liquidation all liabilities paid in full ample capital surplus returned to shareholders
- Fate: Ceased operating 1955
- Headquarters: Idle, Bradford, West Riding of Yorkshire, England, UK
- Key people: Benjamin and William Jowett; Gerald Palmer

Jowett was a manufacturer of light cars and light commercial vehicles in Bradford, West Riding of Yorkshire, England from 1906 to 1954.

== Early history ==
Jowett was founded in 1901 by brothers Benjamin (1877–1963) and William (1880–1965) Jowett with Arthur V. Lamb. They started in the cycle business and went on to make V-twin engines for driving machinery. Some early engines found their way locally into other car makes as replacements. In 1904, they became the Jowett Motor Manufacturing Company based in Back Burlington Street, Bradford. Their first Jowett light car was produced in February 1906 but as their little workshop was fully occupied with general engineering activities, experiments with different engine configurations, and making the first six Scott motorbikes, it did not go into production until 1910, and then after more than 25,000 miles (40,000 km) of exhaustive trials.

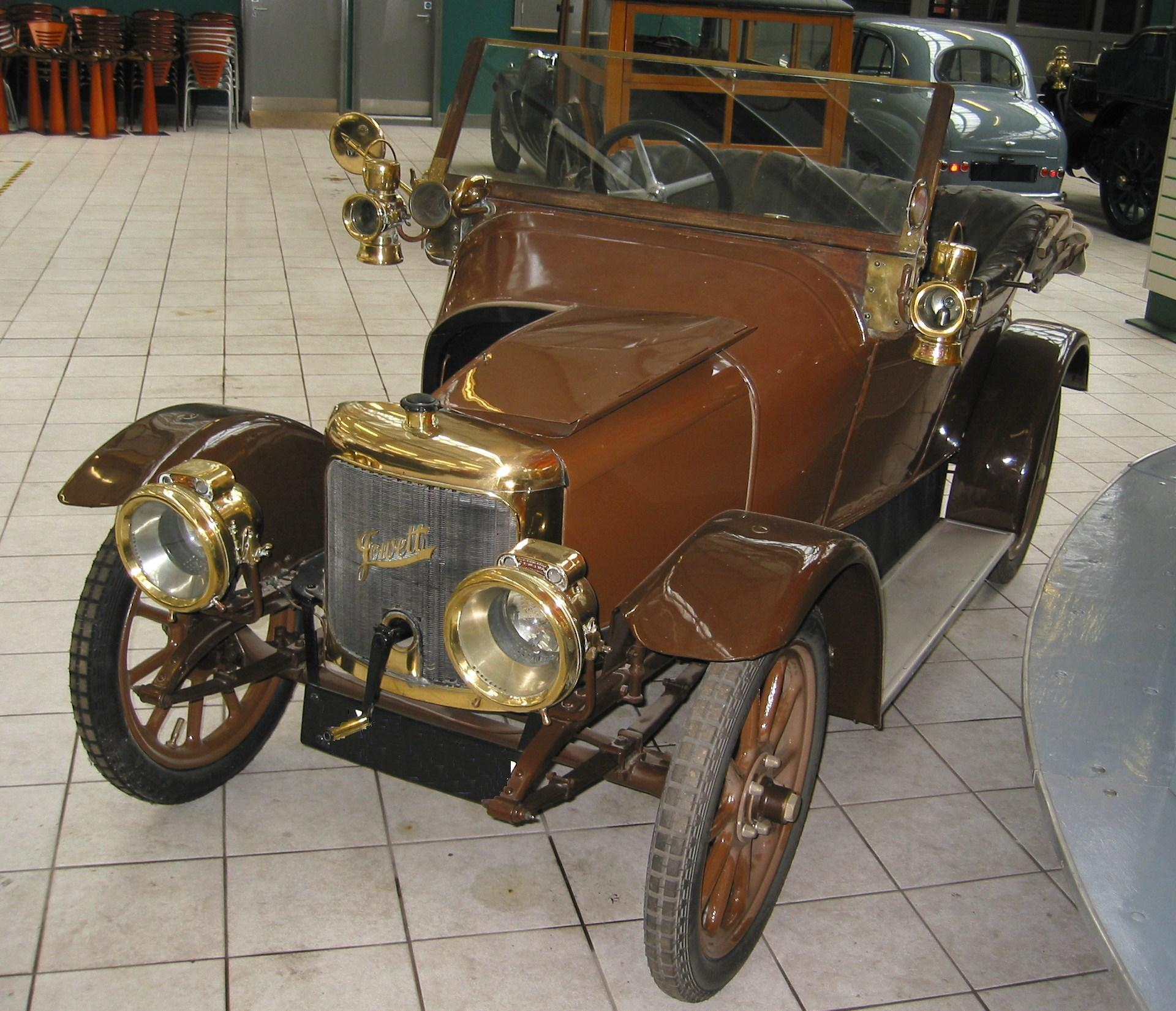
Jowett Eight pre-war example

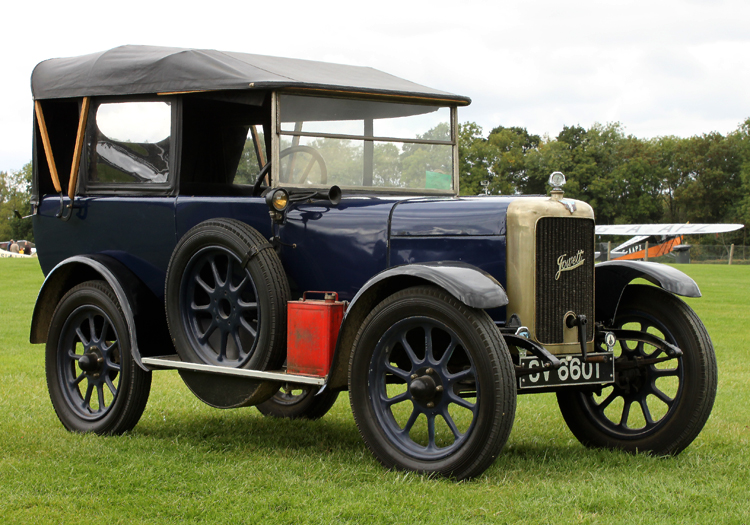
Jowett Seven Chummy short chassis tourer (1926)—Shuttleworth Collection

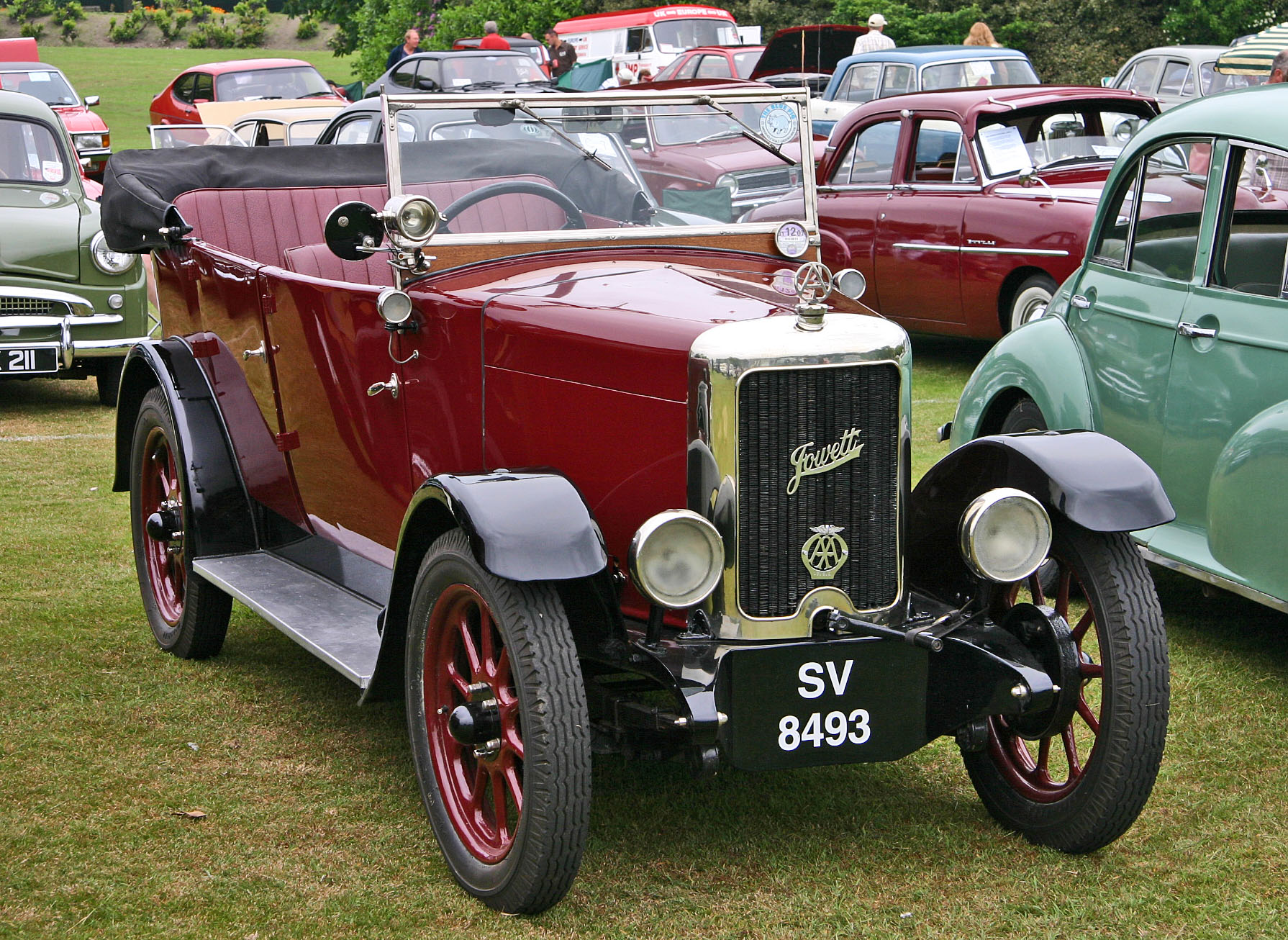
Jowett Seven Long Tourer 1929 example

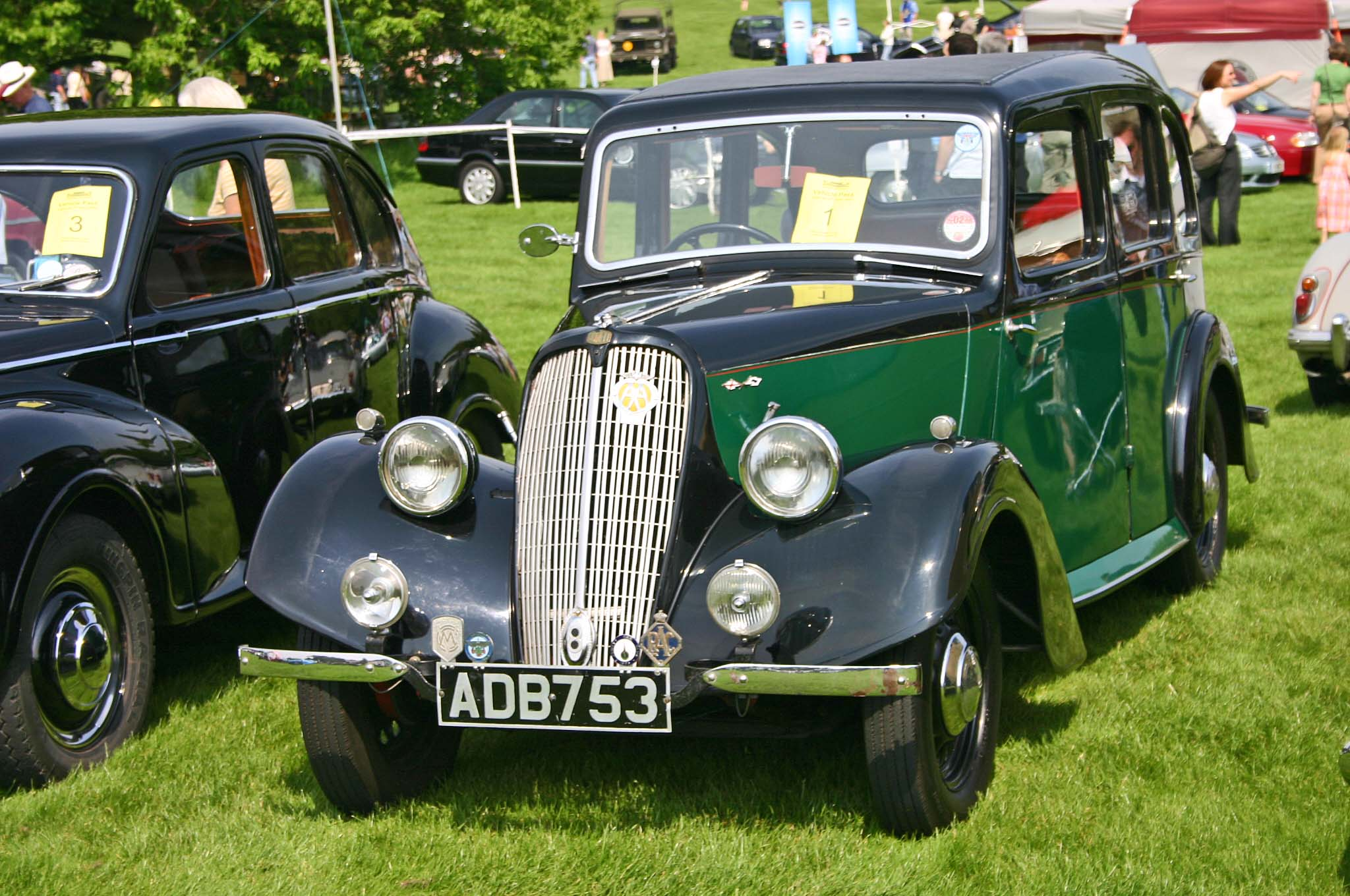
Jowett Eight 2-cylinder 1937

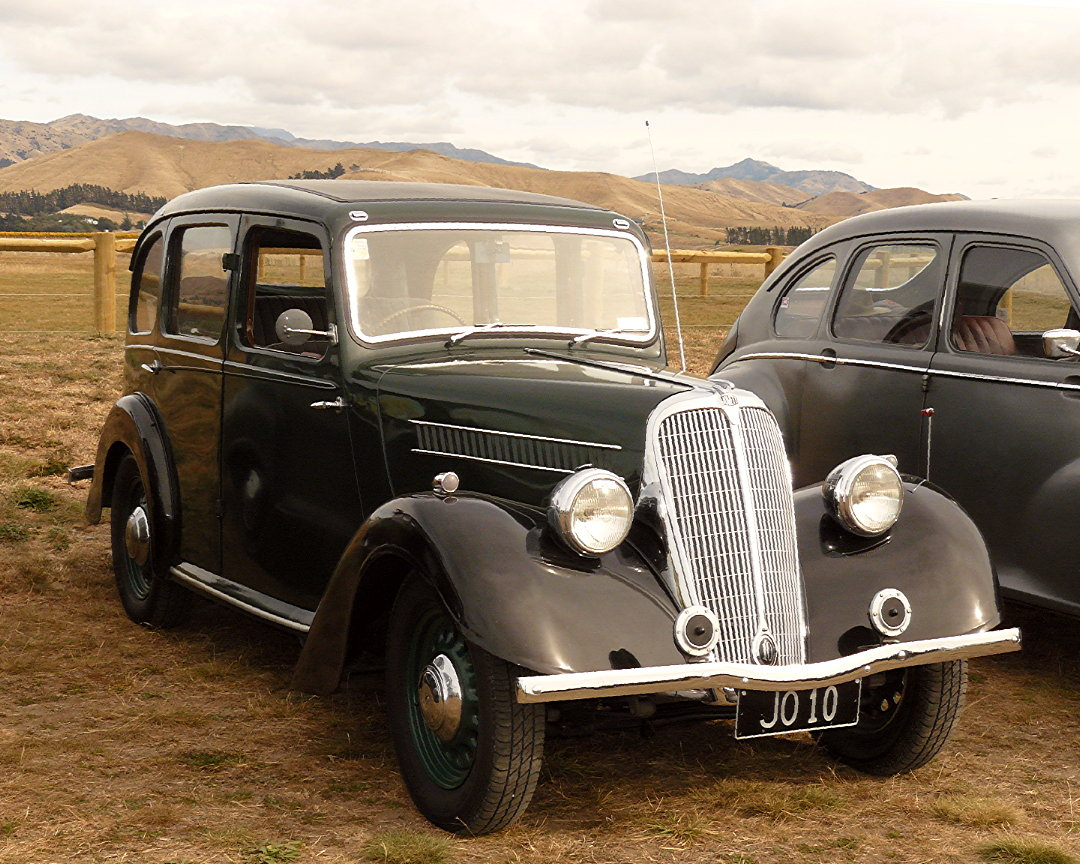
Jowett Ten 4-cylinder 1937

Their intention was to provide a low weight vehicle at a low price and with low running costs. The prototype could be described as the United Kingdom's first real light car. Engine and gearbox were specifically designed for a light car and made largely of aluminium. Its low speed torque and gear ratios were ideally suited to the hills about Bradford and Yorkshire's terrain where poor roads provided little use for a high top speed or quick acceleration. Construction of the engine and the rest of the car was robust. Benjamin Jowett held that their light car class was suffering from engines either from cyclecars with sufficient power but subject to rapid deterioration because of inadequate bearing surfaces, or engines from larger cars too heavy for the rest of the car's structure leading to a different set of troubles. The Jowett engine was designed and built for a light car.

The production car "quickly became popular". It used an 816 cc flat twin water-cooled engine of 6.4 hp and three-speed gearbox with tiller steering. The body was a lightweight open two-seater. Learning popular opinion was that 10 hp was a minimum Jowett advertised their third car as being 8 hp without changing the specification. Twelve vehicles were made before an improved version with wheel steering was launched in 1913 and a further 36 were made before the outbreak of the First World War when the factory was turned over to munitions manufacture. Two tiller steerers still survive.

== Inter-war years ==
Jowett Cars Limited was a new private company formed in June 1919 to make and sell motorcars and it purchased the car manufacturing portion of the business carried on by the Jowett Motor Manufacturing Company. It became a public company listed on the London Stock Exchange in 1935.

That year, 1919, a new works site was bought at Springfield, Bradford Road, Idle, outside Bradford, the site of a disused quarry. Car making started in the new factory in 1920. The first vehicle was the Jowett Seven using an enlarged version of the pre-war flat twin. First it was enlarged to 831 cc then to 907 cc in 1921 when the claim to 8 hp was dropped from advertising. Thereafter all Jowetts were Sevens until the introduction of the four-cylinder engine in 1936. The engine developed its maximum torque at low revs and was soon famed for its pulling power, reliability and economy.

Commercial vehicles based on the car chassis were also built from 1922 and became an increasingly important part of the company's output. Jowett first exhibited at the London Motor Show in 1921 and gradually broke out of their previous local market. In 1923 coil ignition and electric starting were added and the four-seater "Long Four" was introduced in tourer form priced from £245 followed in 1925 by a closed saloon model, the previous short-chassis two-seater continuing in production. In 1929, the engine received removable cylinder heads to ease maintenance and braking was on all four wheels. Production was briefly suspended in September 1931 when fire swept through the works.

1933 saw the launch of the Jowett Kestrel with four-speed gearbox and in 1935 there was the oddly named Jowett Weasel sports tourer. The first four-cylinder (flat four) car arrived in 1936 with the 1166 cc twin carburettor Jowett Ten which continued until the outbreak of war alongside the traditional twin-cylinder models which grew to 946 cc in 1937. In 1935 the company went public and in 1936 Benjamin Jowett retired. Brother William carried on until 1940.

== Second World War ==
Production of cars stopped in 1940 but engine production for motor-generator sets continued alongside aircraft components and other military hardware. The engine was (besides being used as a generator set) also used in the Jowett engine powered Fire Pump. The company was bought by property developer Charles Clore in 1945 and he sold it in 1947 to the bankers Lazard Brothers.

== Post-war ==
When production restarted after the Second World War, the twin-cylinder engine was dropped from the range of new cars, but continued in 1005 cc form to the end of production in the commercial vehicles, now comprising a light lorry, the Bradford van, two versions of an estate car called the Utility, and chassis front-ends and kits for outside coachbuilders, many abroad. The new cars were a complete change from what had gone before with the streamlined Jowett Javelin designed by a team led by Gerald Palmer. This had such advanced features as a flat-four push-rod engine, independent front suspension with torsion bars front and rear, and unitary body construction. The car was good for 80 mph (130 km/h) and had excellent handling. In 1950 the Javelin was joined by the Jowett Jupiter sports car with a chassis designed by Eberan von Eberhorst who had worked for Auto Union. Javelins were designed for production levels never before attempted by Jowett. Javelin and Bradford body production was out-sourced to Briggs Motor Bodies, who built a new plant at Doncaster. Briggs supplied the bodies fully trimmed and ready to be applied to the mechanicals. The Jupiters were always built in-house at Idle. The new mechanicals had teething troubles, but Javelin bodies were still being mass-produced to the original schedule, leading to their being stockpiled. Export sales collapsed by 75 per cent in 1952 followed by sluggish domestic sales while the nation waited for the removal of a "temporarily" increased purchase tax, finally eased in April 1953, with disastrous long-term consequences for Jowett.

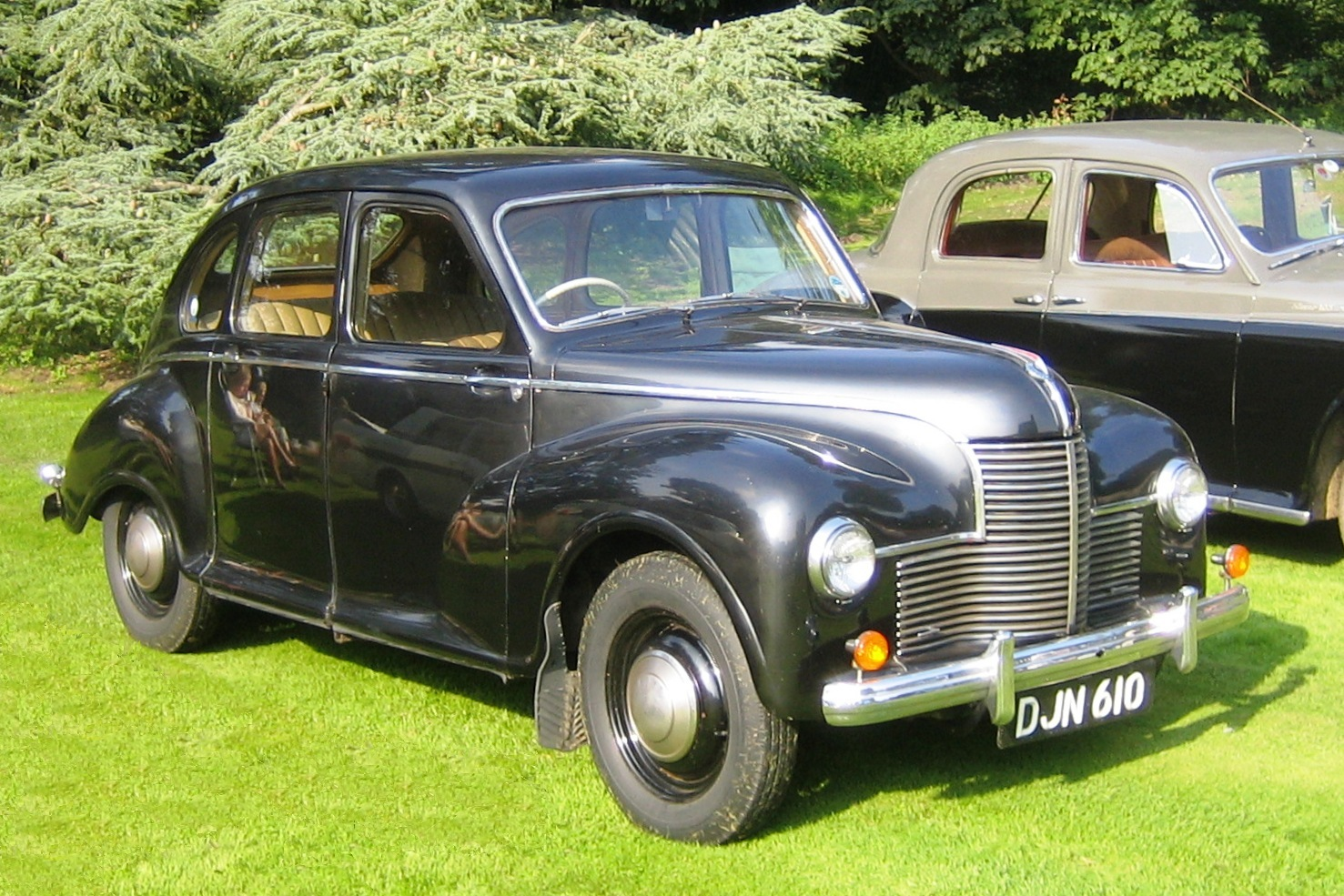
Jowett Javelin saloon in original (metallic) finish, 1949 example

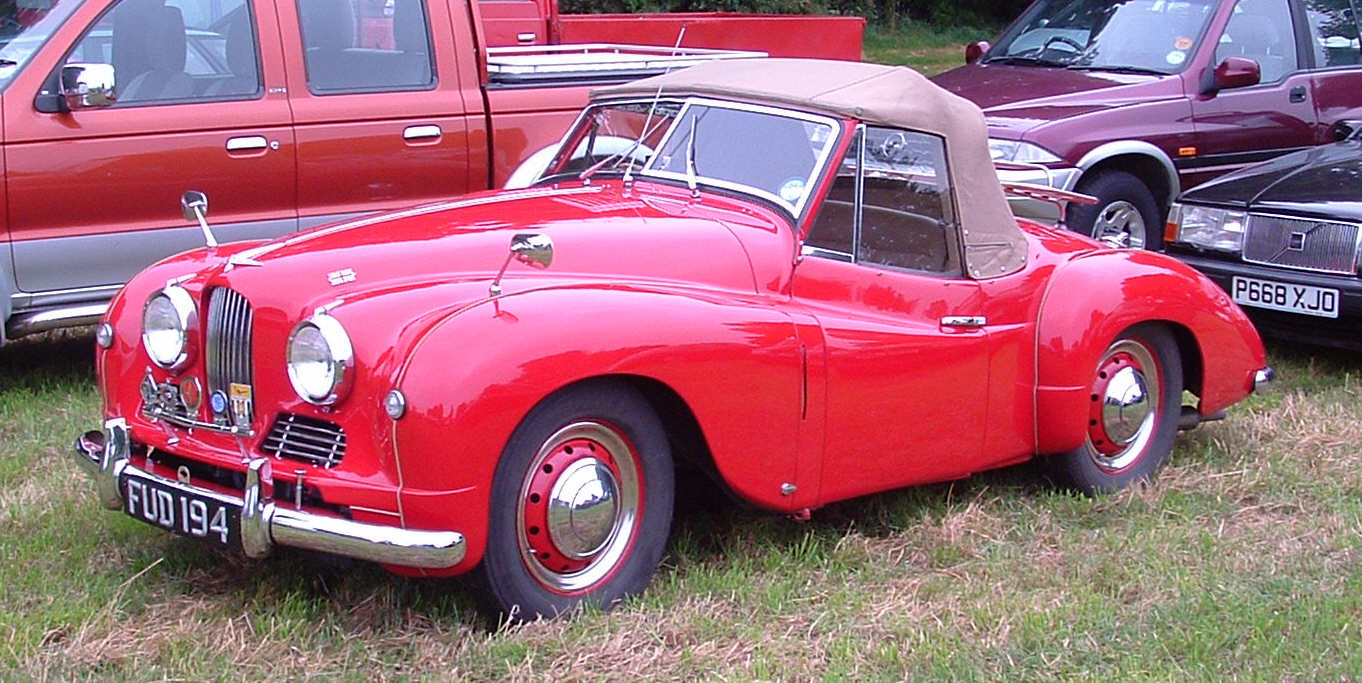
Jowett Jupiter 2-seater sports

Poor business strategy and direction, and over-confidence, were the financially sound company's downfall and, even after the engine and gearbox problems were solved, the Idle plant was never able to build, nor – during 1952 – was the distribution network able to sell, the expected volume. Collapse of the arrangements for the supply of bodies led to suspension of Javelin production in 1953, together with the by now outdated Bradford, though tooling had been completed for new models. Jupiters remained in demand and were built up to the end of 1954. The company did not go broke, but sold its factory to International Harvester who made tractors at the site until the early 1980s. The factory was demolished in 1983.

Jowett switched to manufacturing aircraft parts for the Blackburn & General Aircraft Company in a former woollen mill at Howden Clough, Birstall, near Batley. Jowett, just the "shell" of the company, was later taken over by Blackburn in 1956, although spares for the postwar cars were kept available until 1963, when the remainder of the Jowett company was closed due to the rationalisation of the aircraft industry.

=== Crisis and closure ===
The purchase tax on new cars was reduced by 25 per cent on 15 April 1953 (from 66 2/3 per cent to 50 per cent), which triggered a surge in demand for new cars on the UK market. In the resulting scramble for production facilities, Ford bought Briggs, whose new Doncaster plant built the unitary construction bodies and fully trimmed them for Jowett Javelin cars and Bradford vans. In April 1953, the Ford Motor Company Limited purchased from the US shareholders majority control of Briggs Motor Bodies Limited, whose main factory was adjacent to the Ford plant at Dagenham. Remaining minority shareholders were bought out, and Ford quickly acquired full ownership of the Briggs business. The Briggs factory at Doncaster was surplus to Ford's requirements and it was sold to Fisher and Ludlow. Fisher and Ludlow itself was quickly swallowed up by the newly created British Motor Corporation.

At the beginning of July, the Chairman of Jowett Cars Limited, A.F. Jopling, who at the time was also a senior employee with Blackburn Aircraft, informed Jowett shareholders at their Annual General Meeting that difficulties had arisen over the future supply of car bodies. Negotiations were proceeding, but an interruption in delivery of completed vehicles appeared likely to occur in the closing months of that year. He also reported that exports for 1952 were almost 75 per cent down on 1951. On the home market, during the six-month run-up to tax changes in April 1953, the anticipated success of an organised campaign for a reduction in purchase tax had sharply reduced previously buoyant UK new car demand. Home market sales in the last quarter of 1952 were only 15 per cent of the sales in the three preceding quarters.

In mid-September the board advised shareholders that the forecast break in production was unavoidable, and that it might prove to be of considerable duration. Having regard to this possibility, negotiations extended to suitable alternative work which would keep the factory reasonably employed. It also advised that the difficulty in arranging supplies of new bodies would unfortunately postpone the production of the new range of commercial vehicles, and the estate car, which were fully tooled-up.

The business appeared to be running out of working capital and car production ceased.

In July 1954 it was announced that Jowett Cars Limited would sell its main factory at Idle to International Harvester, excluding plant and equipment needed for the service and spares departments.

A note was added by The Times that Jowett Cars had run into difficulties the previous year (1953), following the acquisition of the motor body suppliers Fisher and Ludlow by BMC, completed in September 1953. "It is now stated that since the company ceased manufacturing Javelin and Bradford vehicles it has not been found possible to keep the main factory operating at an economic level." However Jowett Cars Limited reported a (small) profit for the financial year.

At the 35th Annual General Meeting in August 1954, the chairman advised the profound regret of the board and all associated with the company, including the users of the some 65,000 vehicles which had been made since 1946, for their joint circumstances.

Ultimately shareholders received back rather more than the nominal value of their shares. That process was completed in mid-1955.

== Jowett 1930s gallery ==
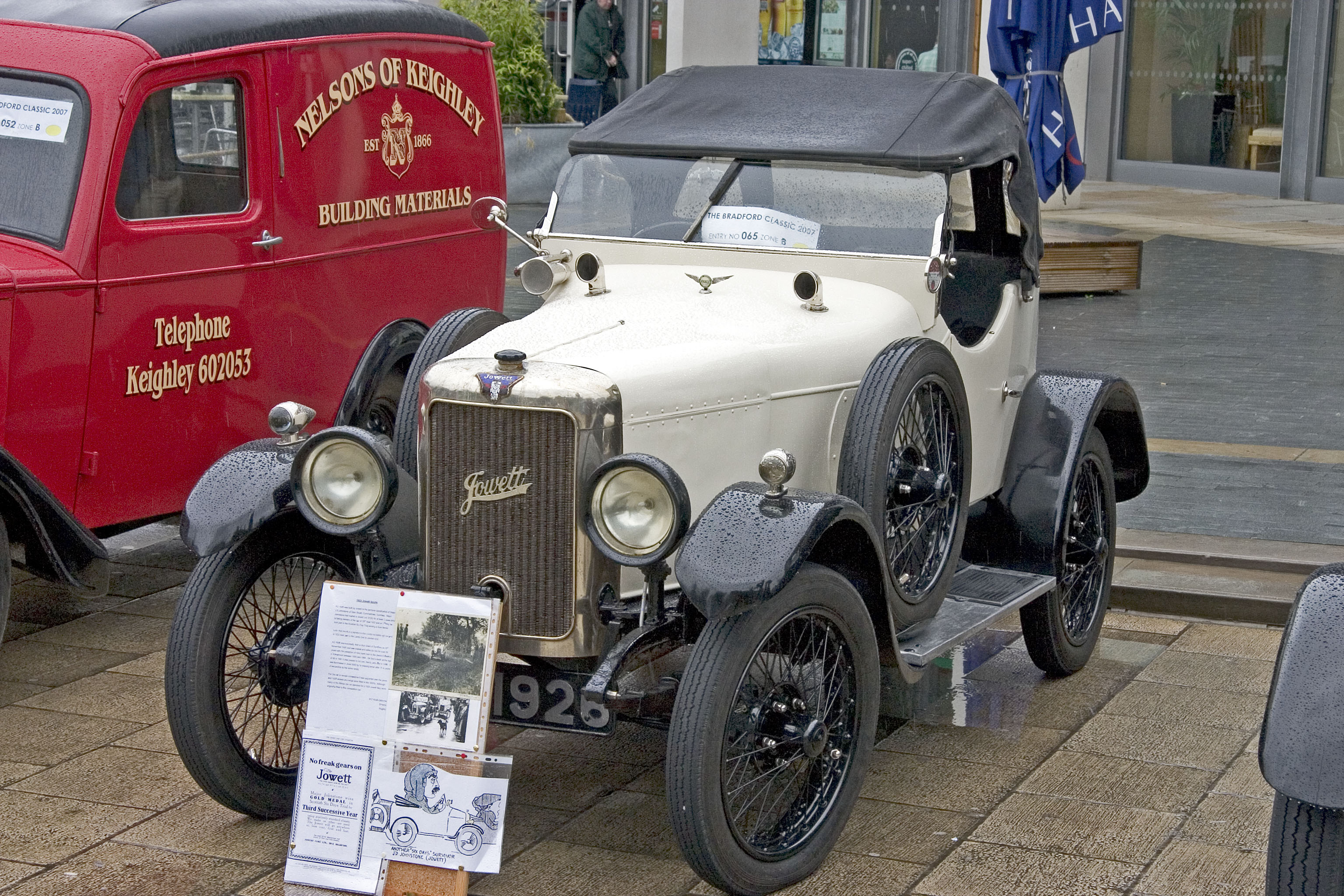
Jowett Sports 1923

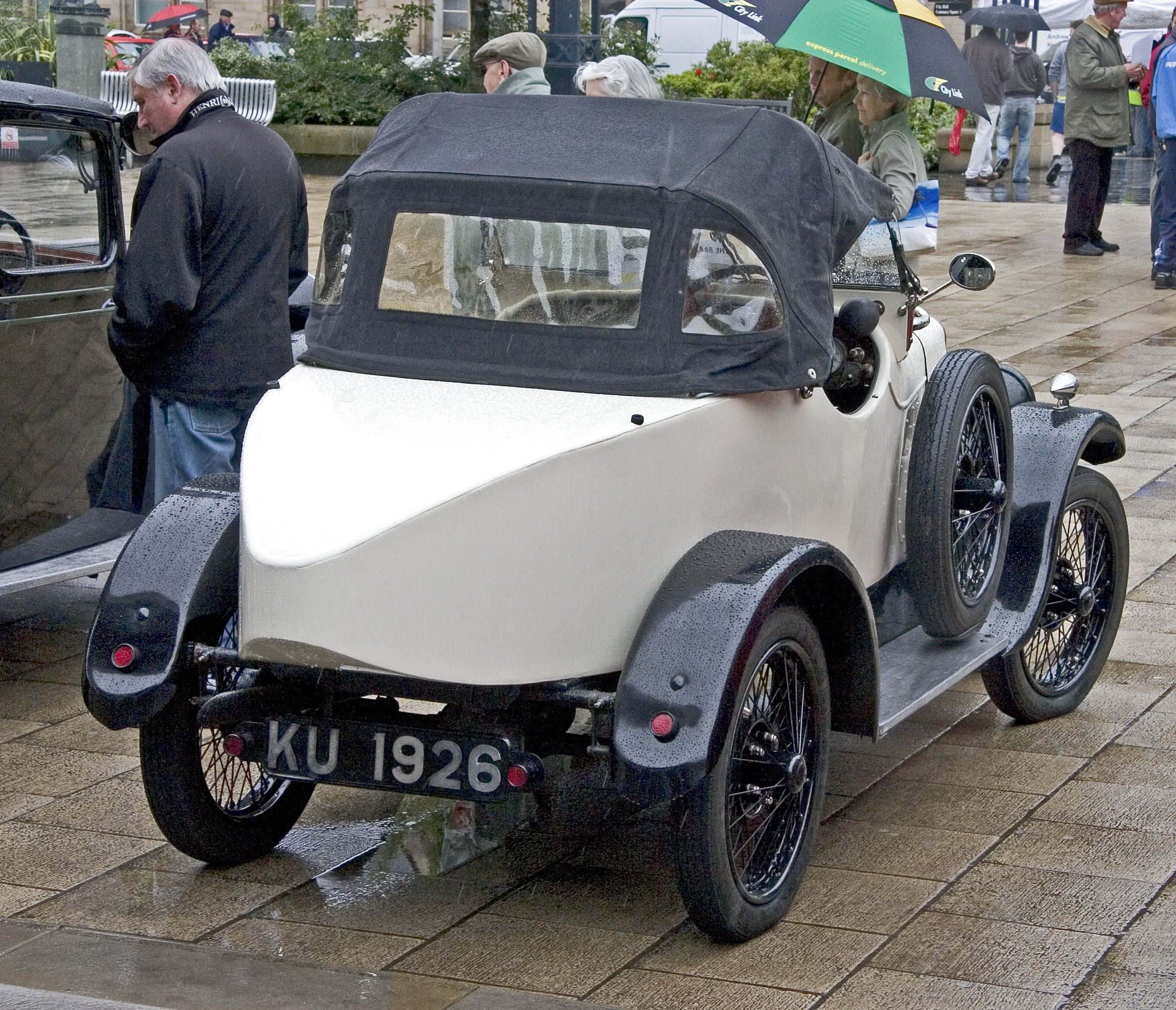
Rear of Jowett Sports

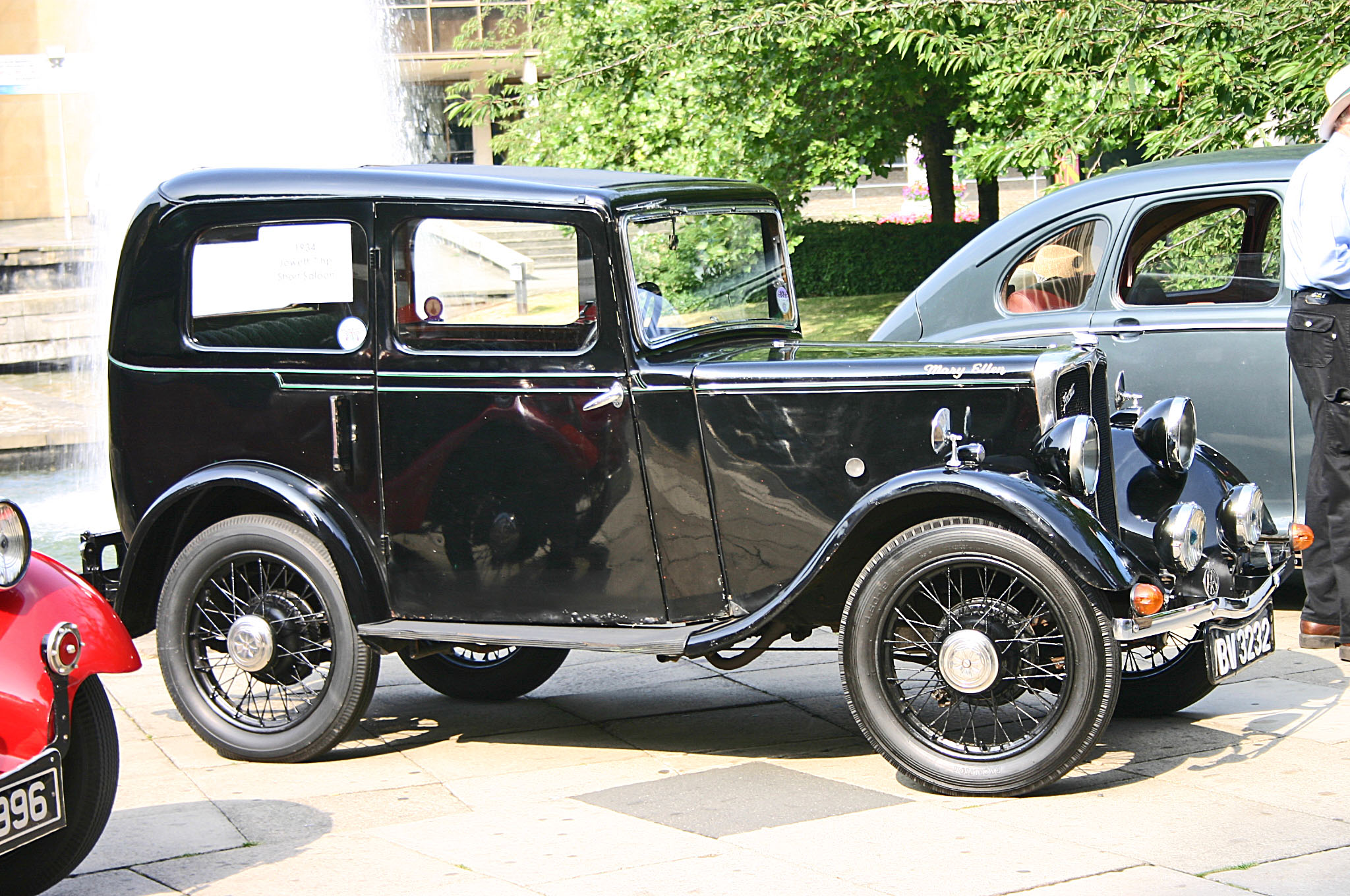
Jowett 7 hp 1930

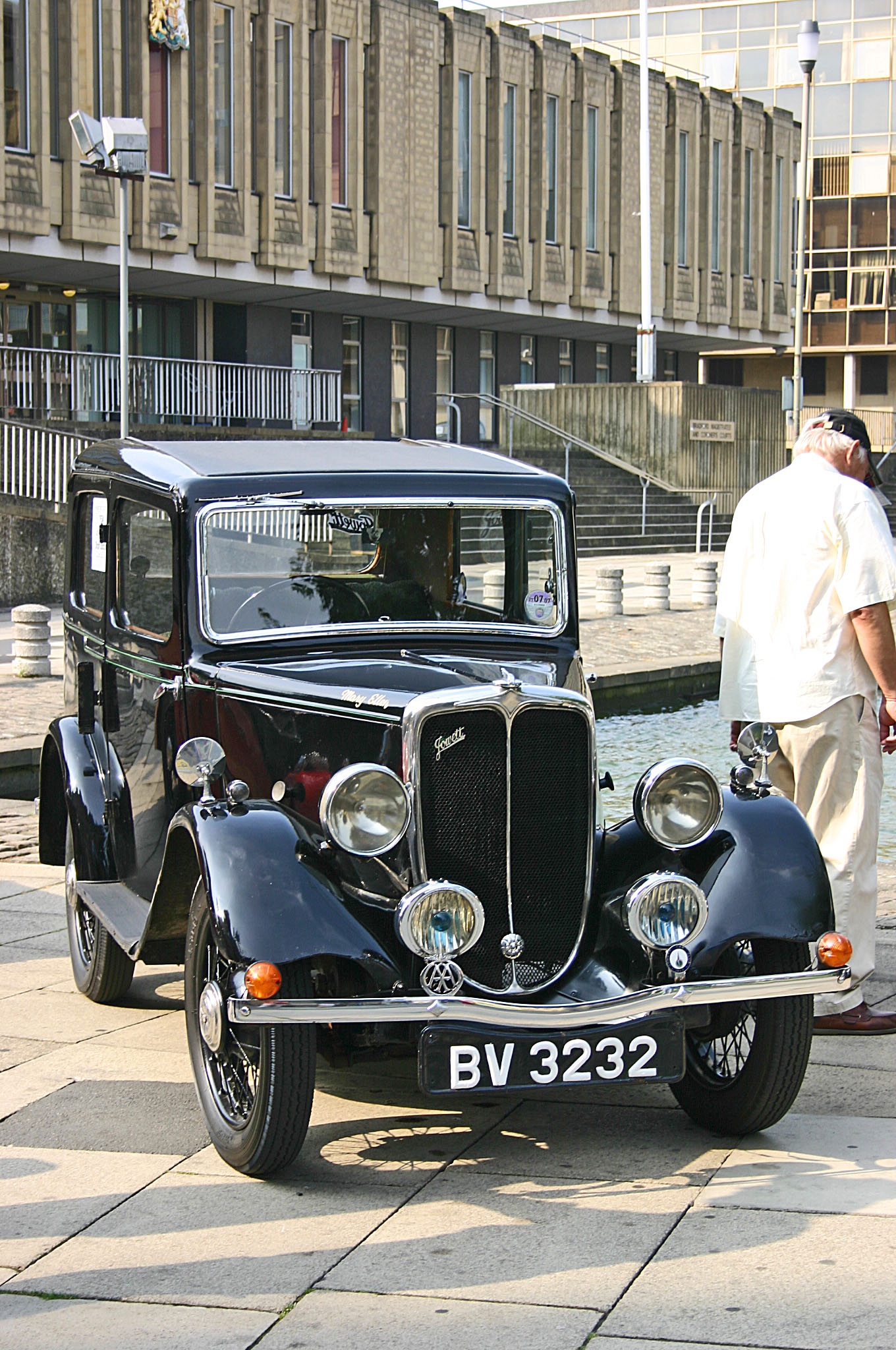
Jowett 7 hp

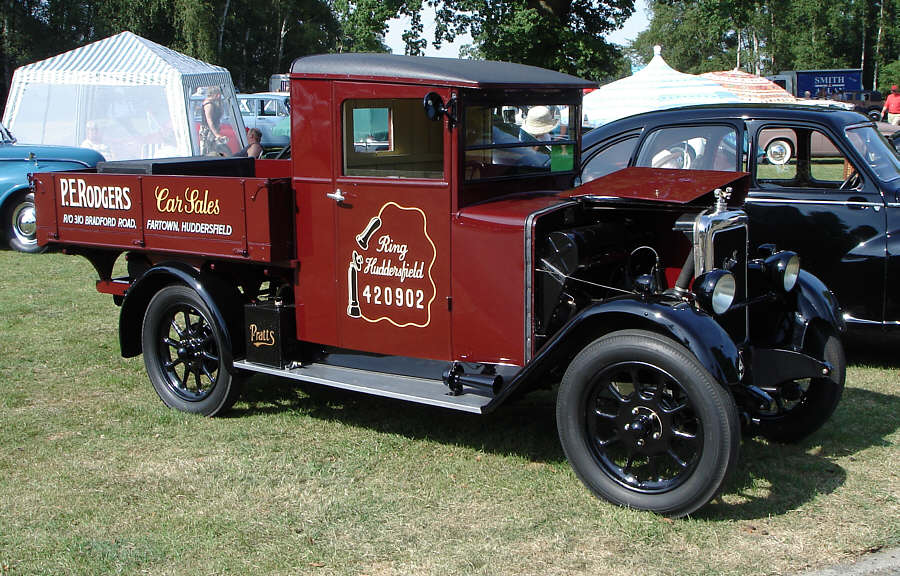
Jowett lorry 1930

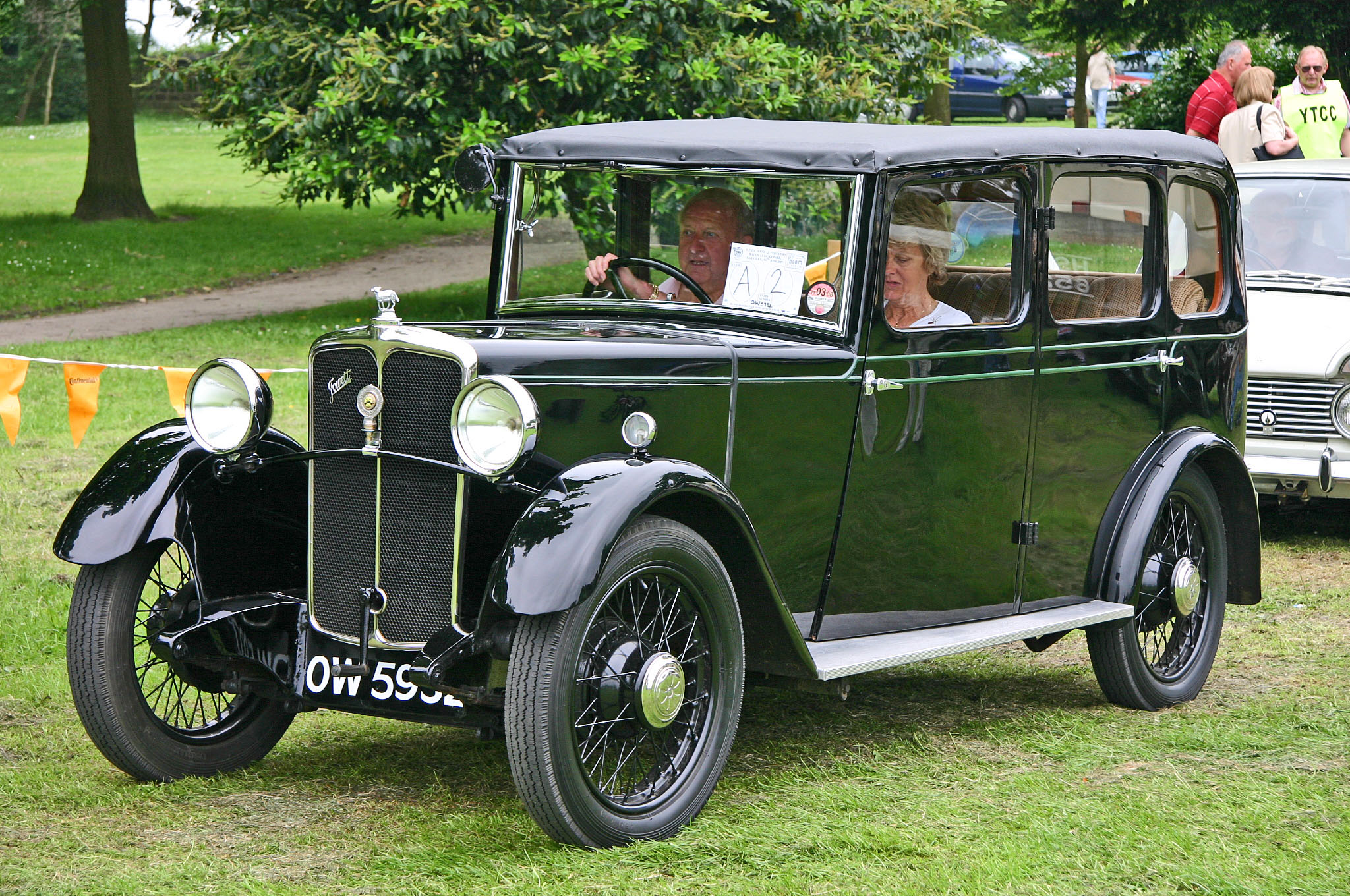
Jowett 7 hp Blackbird 1932

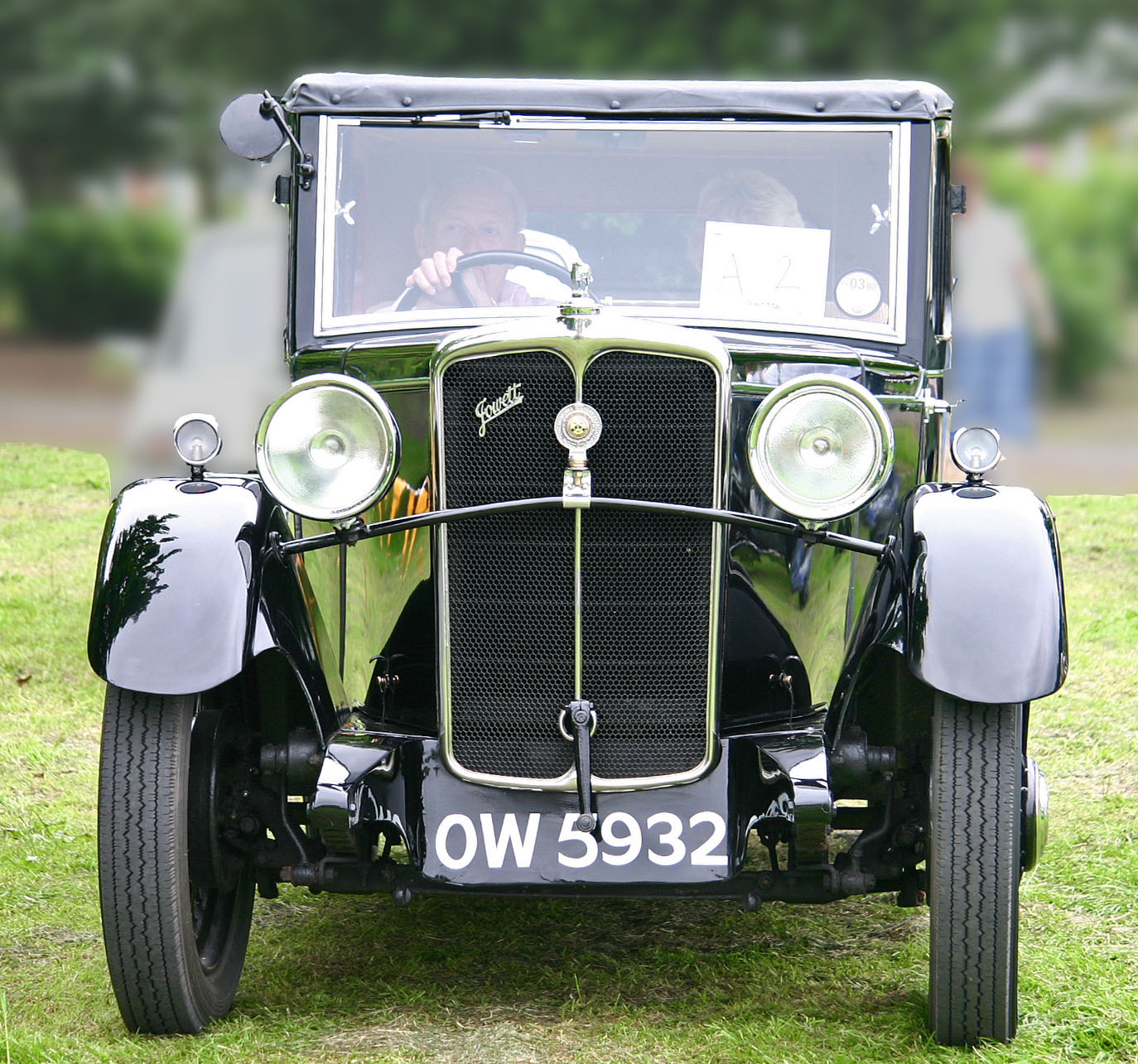
Jowett 7 hp Blackbird 1932

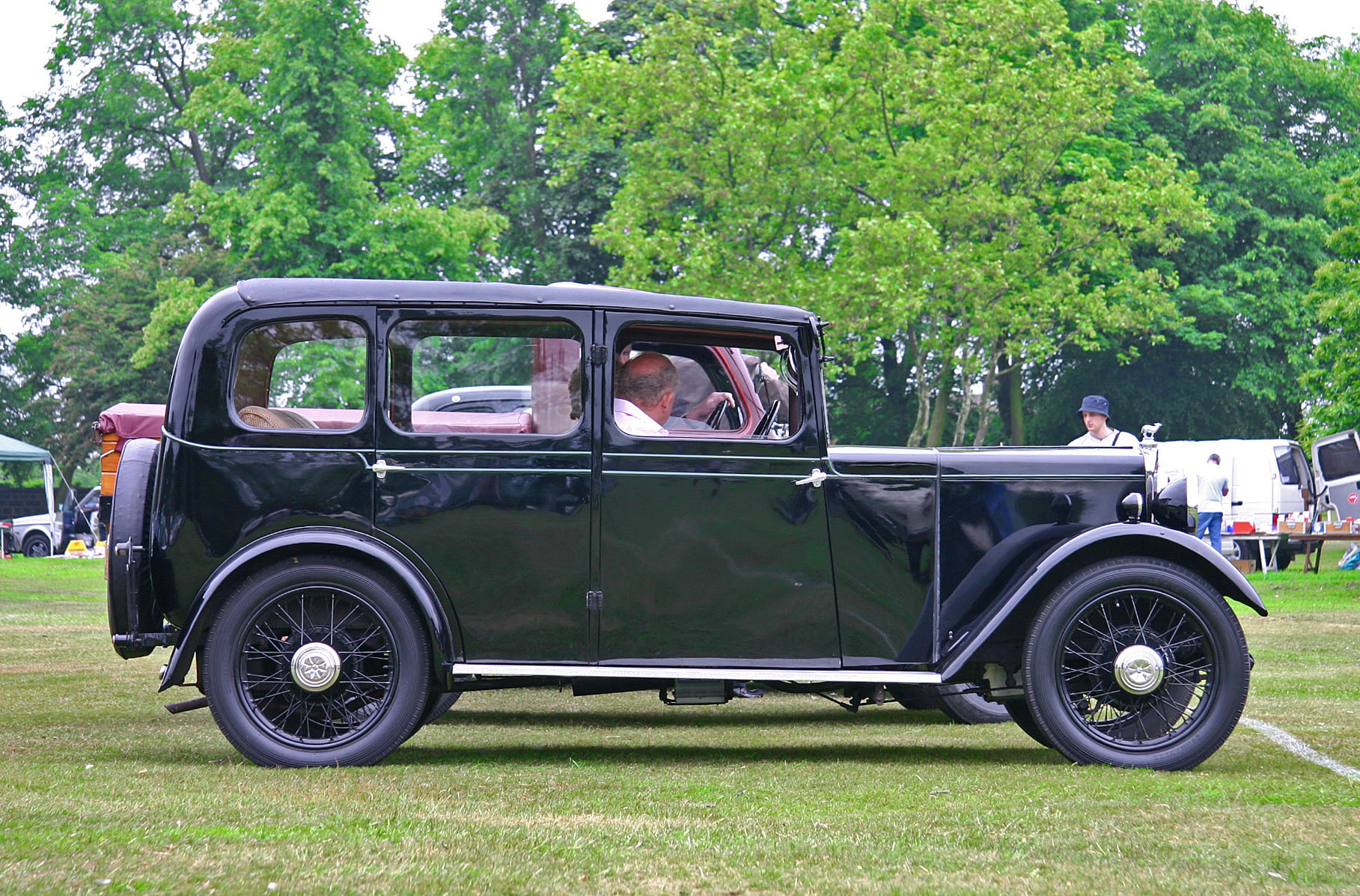
Jowett 7 hp Blackbird 1932

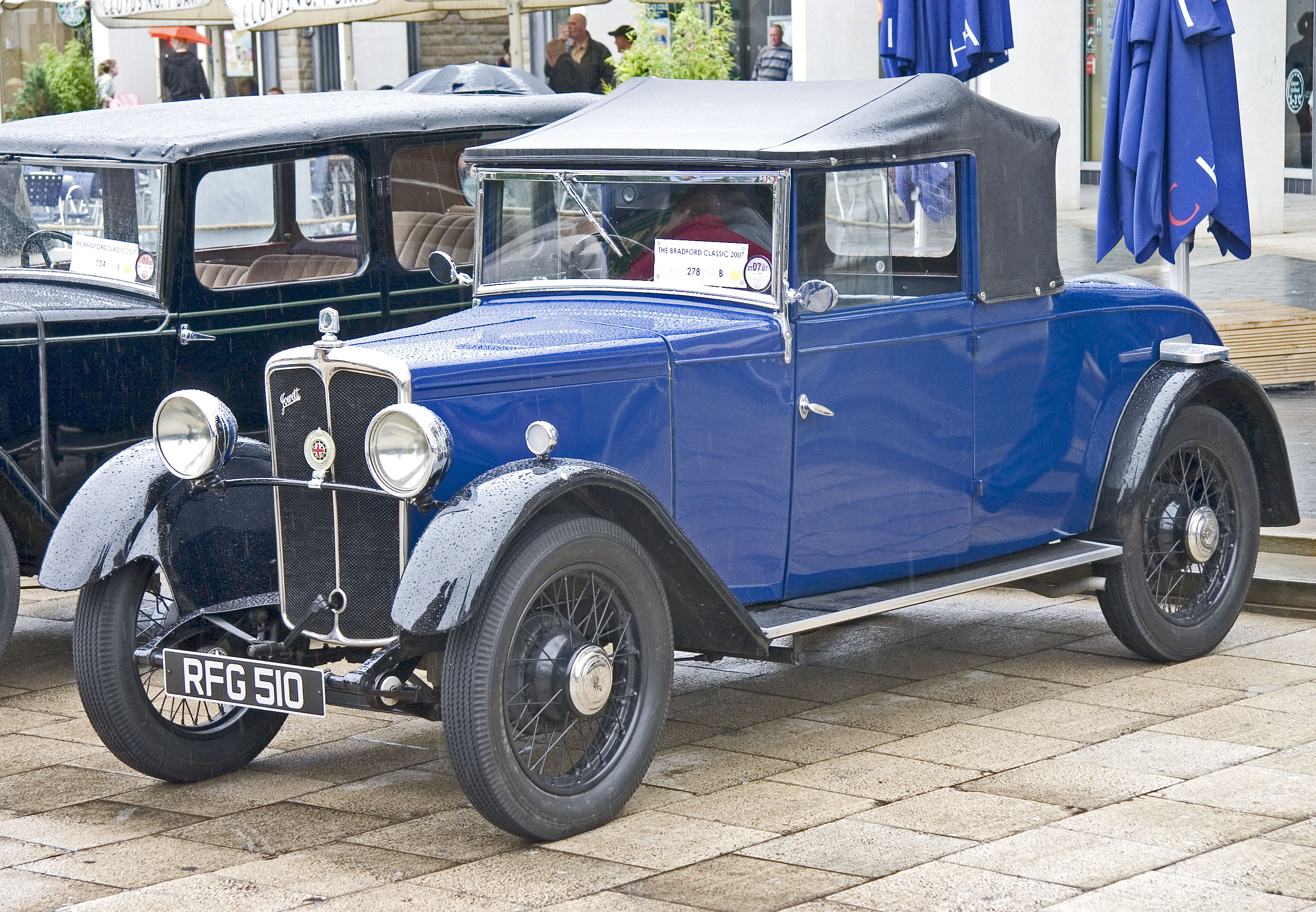
Jowett 7 hp Flying Fox 1933

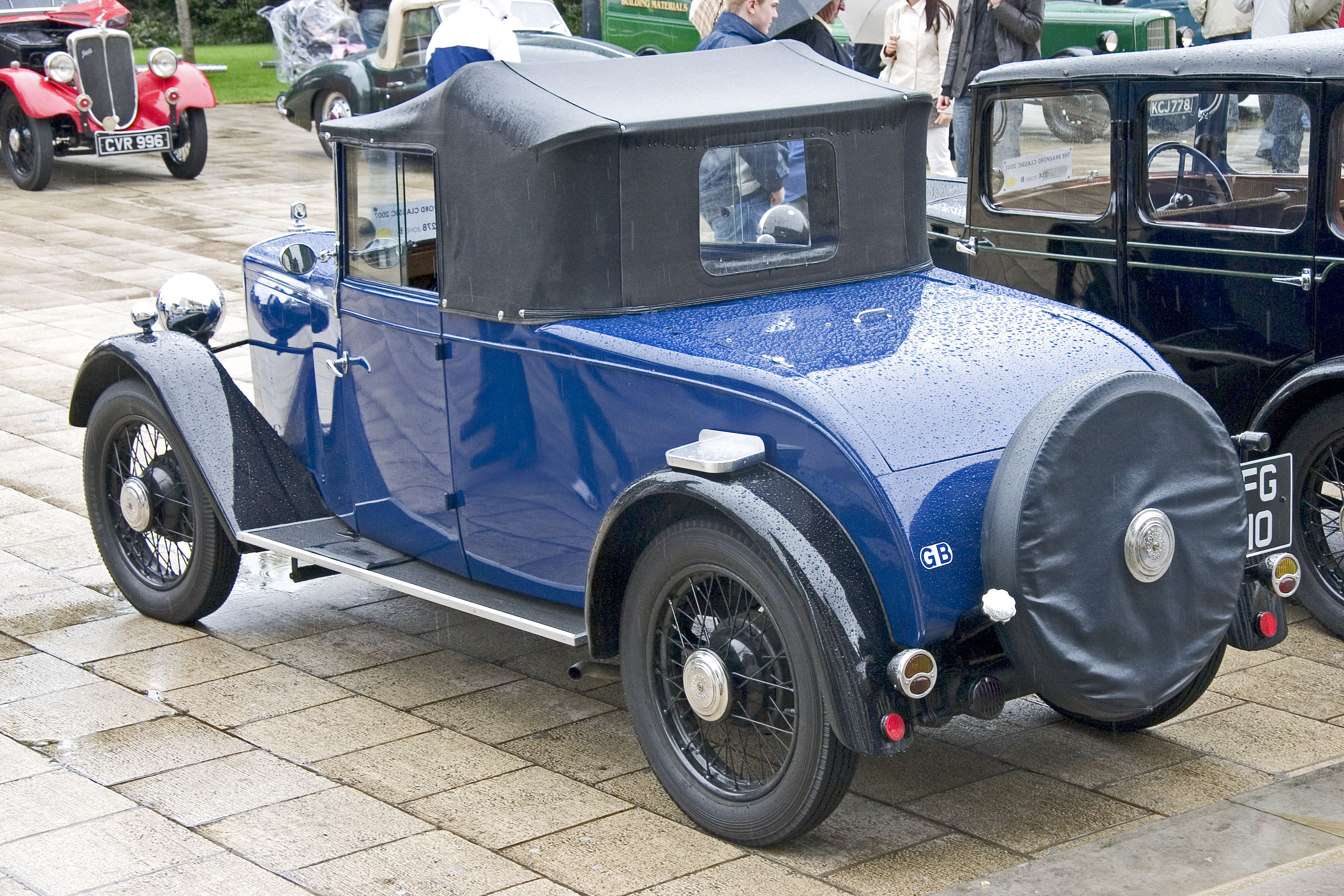
2 plus 2 Jowett 7 hp 1933

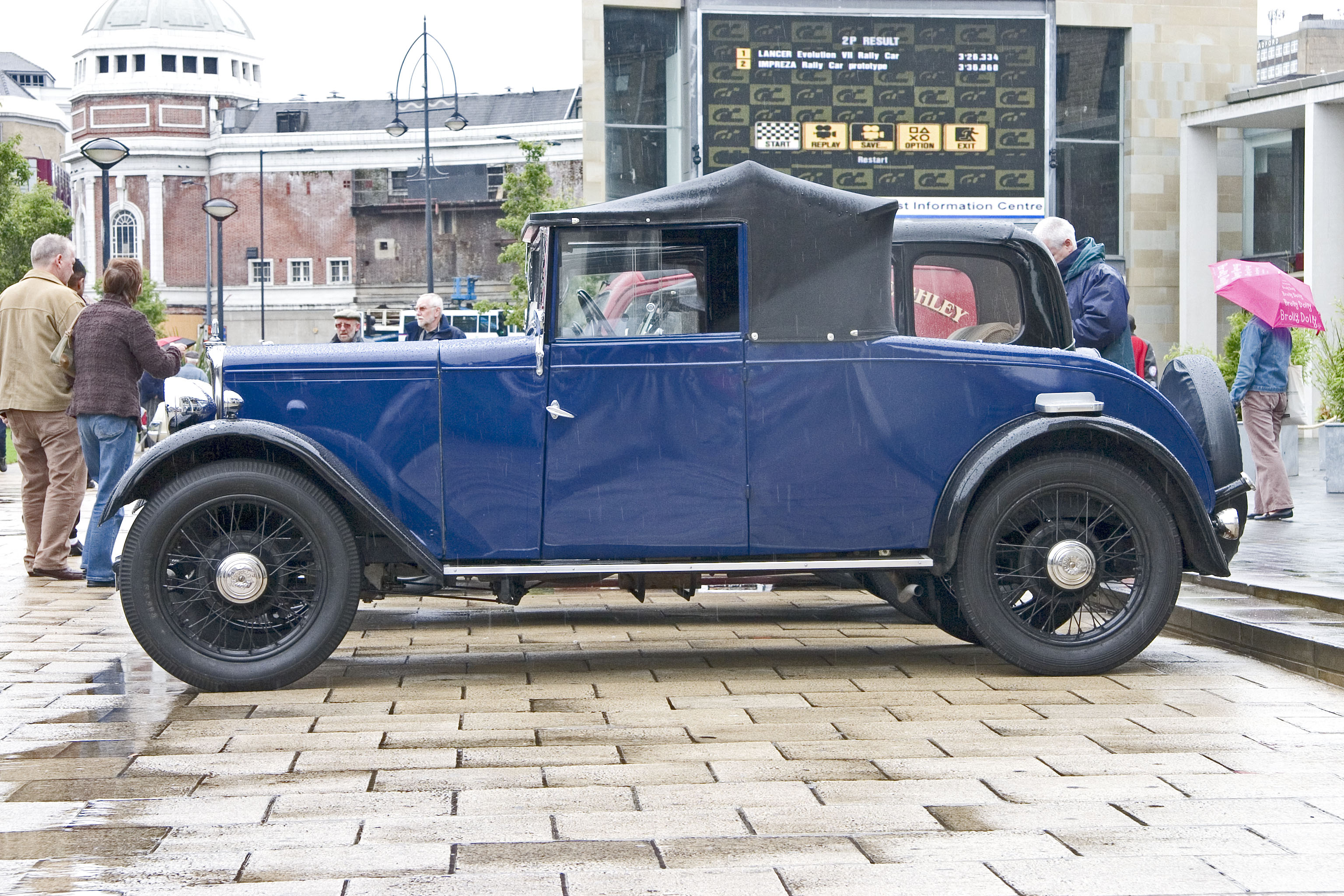
7 hp Flying Fox 2 plus 2 Jowett

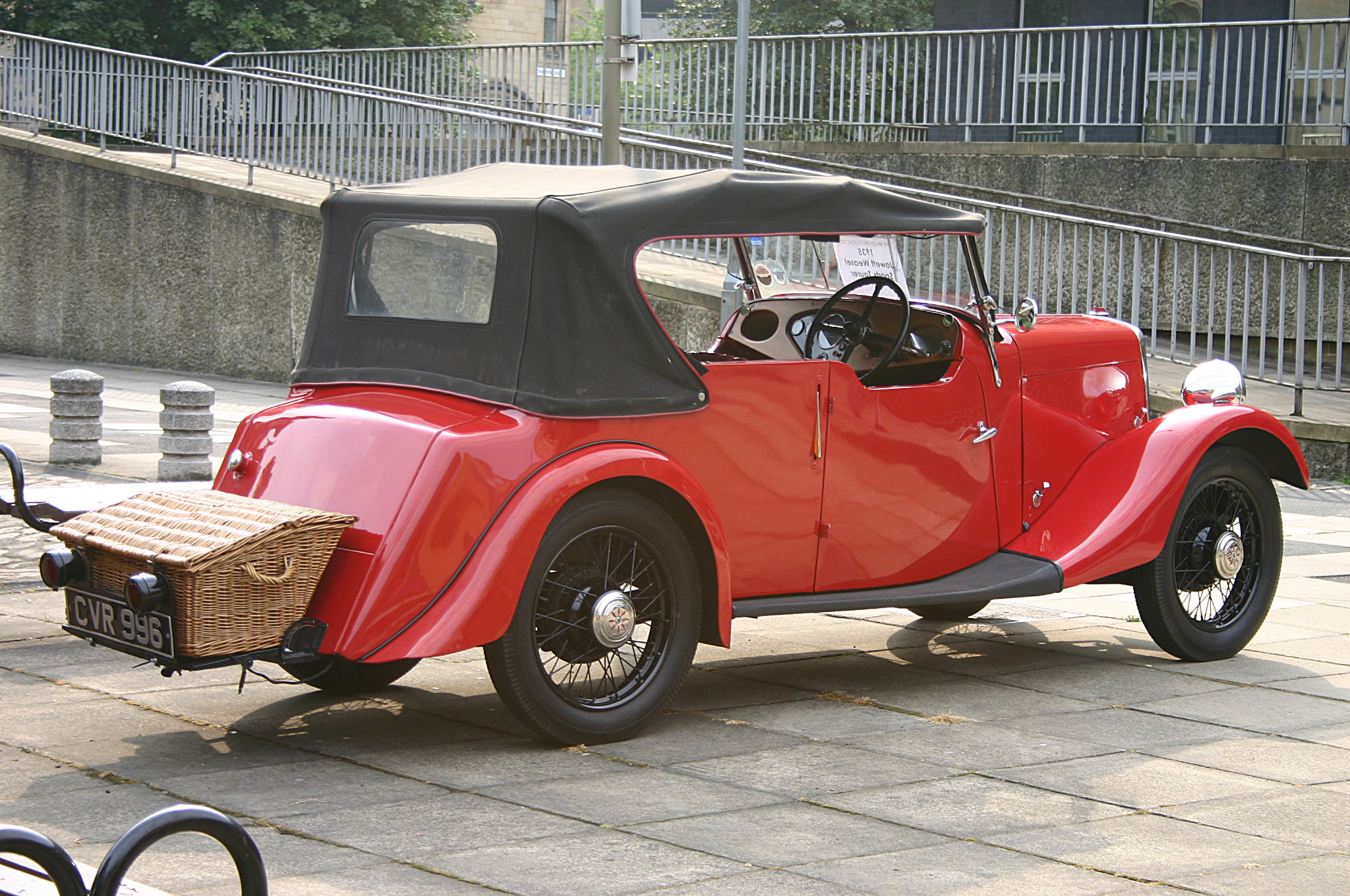
Jowett 7 hp Weasel 1935

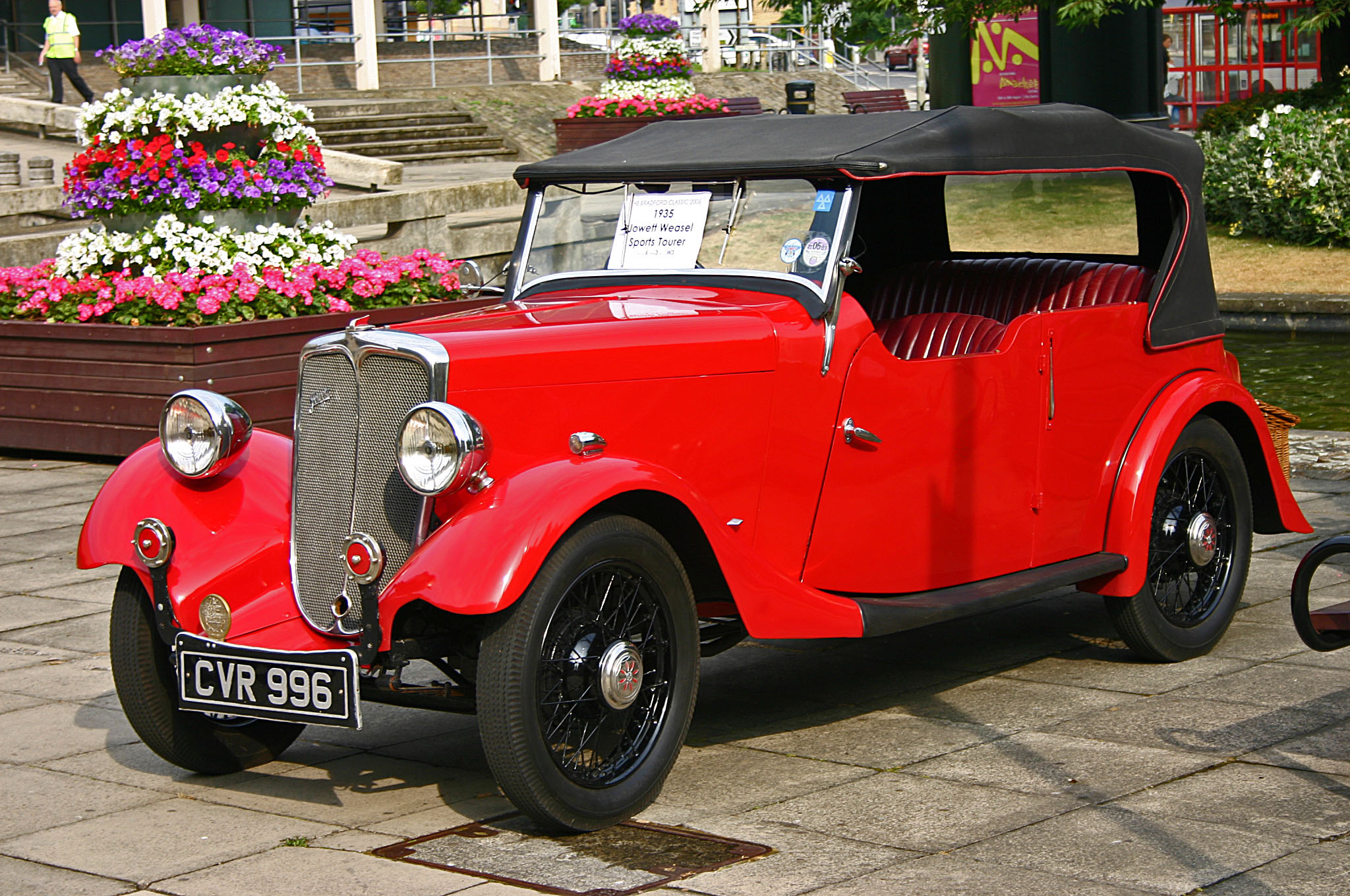
Jowett 7 hp Weasel 1935

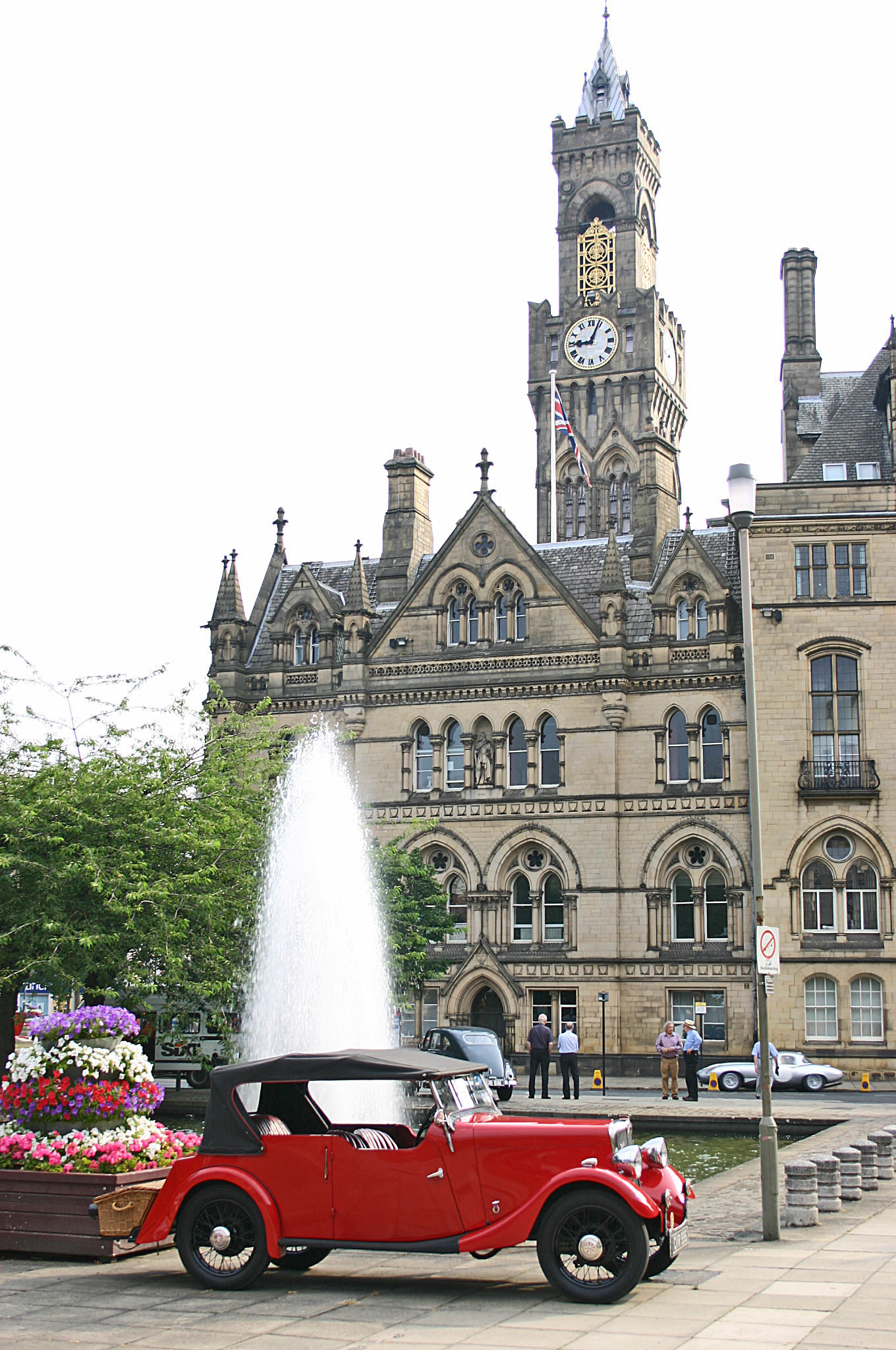
Jowett 7 hp Weasel 1935
by Bradford City Hall

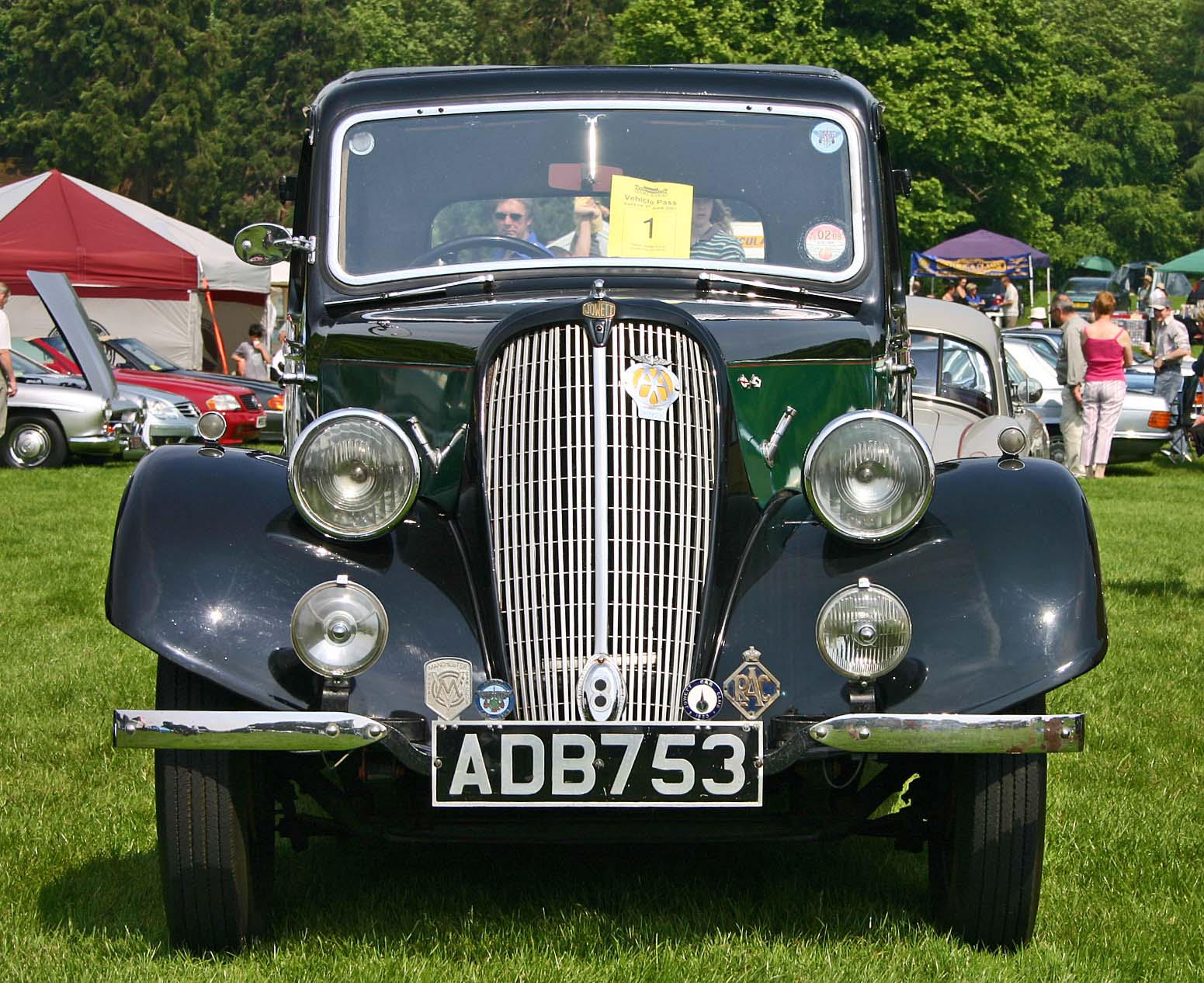
Jowett Eight

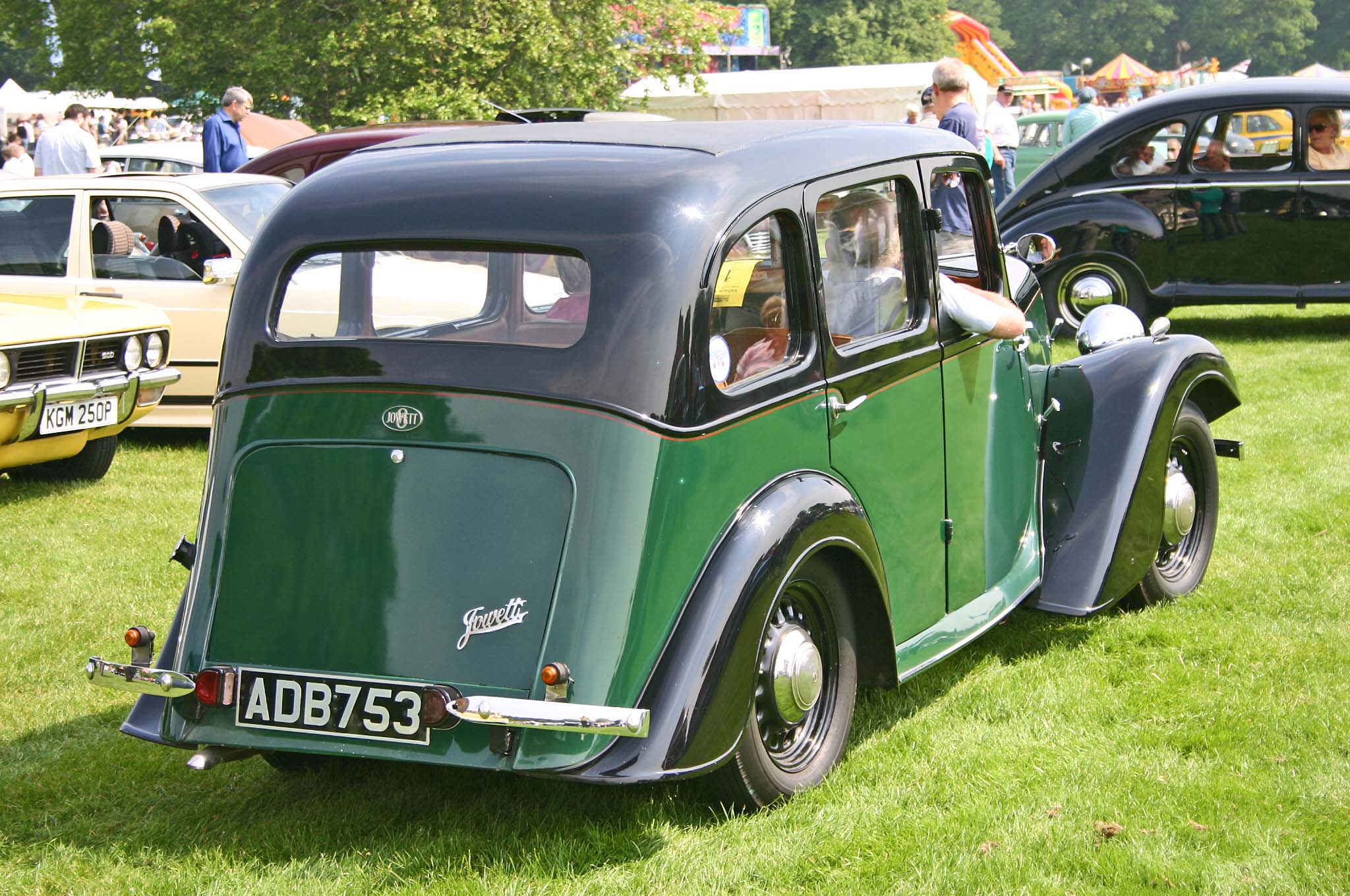
Jowett Eight

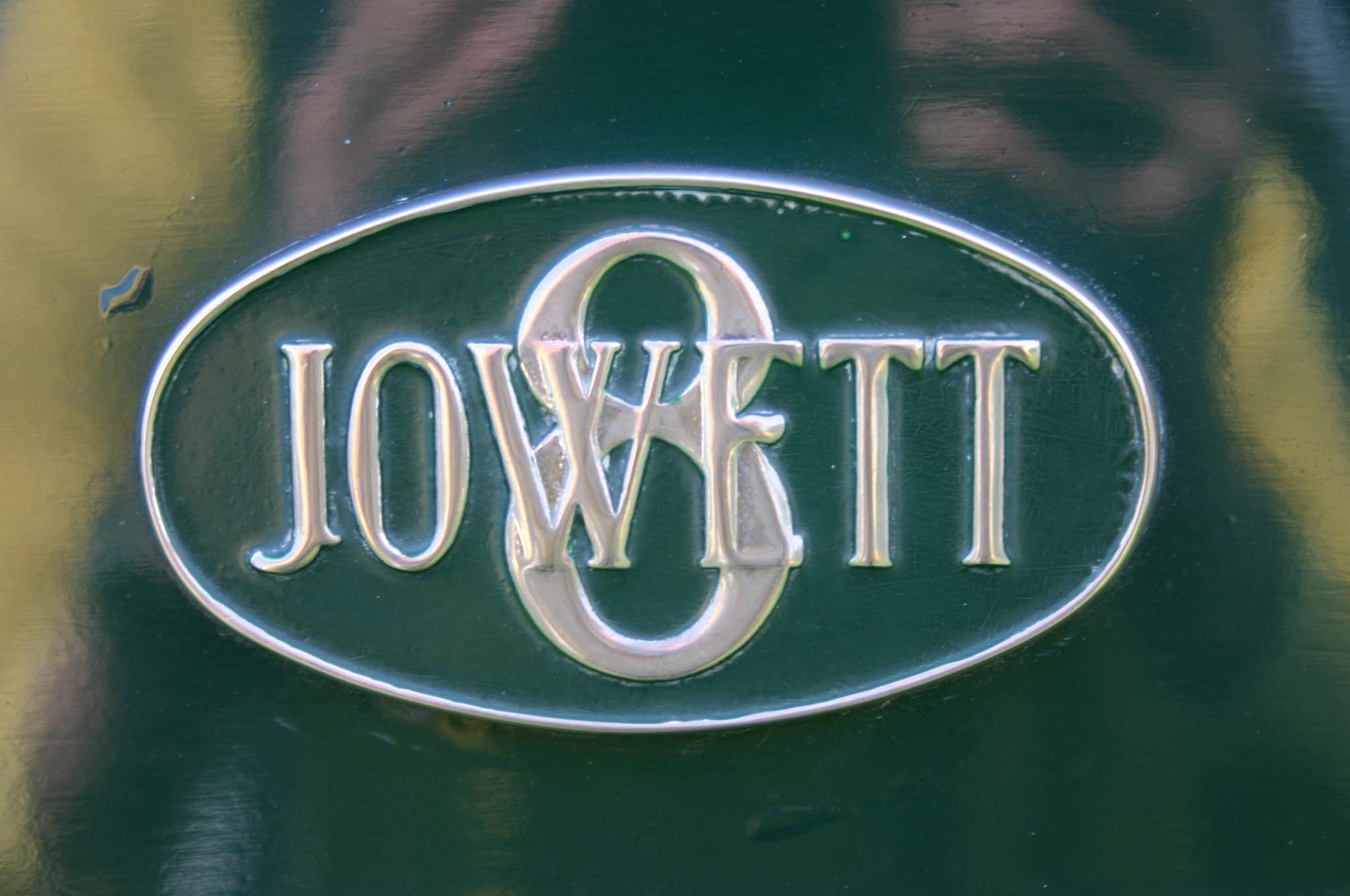
Jowett Eight badge

== Important models ==
Type	Engine	Production	Body styles	Year	Notes
Jowett 6 hp	816 cc side-valve flat twin water-cooled	48	2-seater	1906–1914	Three-speed gearbox. 831 cc from 1914
Jowett 7 hp	907 cc side-valve flat twin	11,444 (inc Long 7)	2-door fabric saloon, 2-door coachbuilt saloon	1919–1930	Three-speed gearbox. Four-wheel brakes from 1930. 84 in (2,100 mm) wheelbase
Jowett "Long" 7 hp	907 cc side-valve flat twin	11,444 (inc Short 7)	2-seater, sports tourer, 4-door fabric saloon, Kestrel coachbuilt saloon, Black Prince, Silverdale and Grey Knight de-luxe saloons, Simba tourer, Weasel sports tourer.	1930–36	102 in (2,600 mm) wheelbase. 12-volt electrics from 1933. Four-speed gearbox from 1934. Twin carburettors on the Weasel.
Jowett Ten	1166 cc side-valve flat four	1,881	saloon (Jupiter, Jason, Plover and Peregrine), van	1936–1940	Twin carburettors up to 1937.
Jowett Eight	946 cc side-valve flat twin	2,888	saloon	1937–1940	
Jowett Javelin	1486 cc overhead-valve flat four	23,307	saloon	1947–1953	Class win, 1949 Monte Carlo Rally. Class win, 1949 Spa 24-hours race. Outright win, 1953 International Tulip Rally. Class win, 1952 & 1953 RAC Rally
Jowett Jupiter	1486 cc overhead-valve flat four	900	convertible	1950–1954	Tubular semi-space frame, hydraulic brakes. Some supplied as chassis to independent coach builders such as Pininfarina, Ghia Suisse, E. D. Abbott Ltd, Harold Radford. Class-winner at 1950 24 Hours of Le Mans in its first race. Also, outright win at the 1951 Lisbon International Rally and class win at Le Mans in 1951. In 1952 Le Mans was class-won by the sports-racing variant Jupiter type R1.
Jowett Bradford	1005 cc side-valve flat twin	38,241	light truck, van and utility	1946–1953	Three-speed gearbox
Jowett R4	1486 cc overhead-valve flat four	3	sports	1953	Body fabric reinforced plastic. Never reached production. Top speed 100 mph (160 km/h)

== Clubs ==
There are some eight Jowett club regions in the UK, Australian and New Zealand groups, that exist to support Jowett. Members gather with their cars for sectional meetings once a year, for a National Rally. Members and their cars from the USA and Europe have attended.

== Famous Jowett Jupiter owners ==
- John Blashford-Snell – explorer
- Don Cockell – boxer
- Peter Craven – speedway ace
- Ernest Dudley – author of crime fiction
- Martin Fry – lead singer of ABC
- Red Skelton – comedian
- John Surtees – racing driver
- Peter Ustinov – actor and dramatist
- Budge Rogers – Bedford Rugby Captain and England player – 34 caps
- Bill Lock – father of comedian Trevor Lock: the name of Trevor's band, 'Jowett', was influenced by the car

== See also ==
- Bradford Industrial Museum, which has an extensive collection of Jowett vehicles.
- E. D. Abbott Ltd
- List of car manufacturers of the United Kingdom
