= Jowett Bradford =

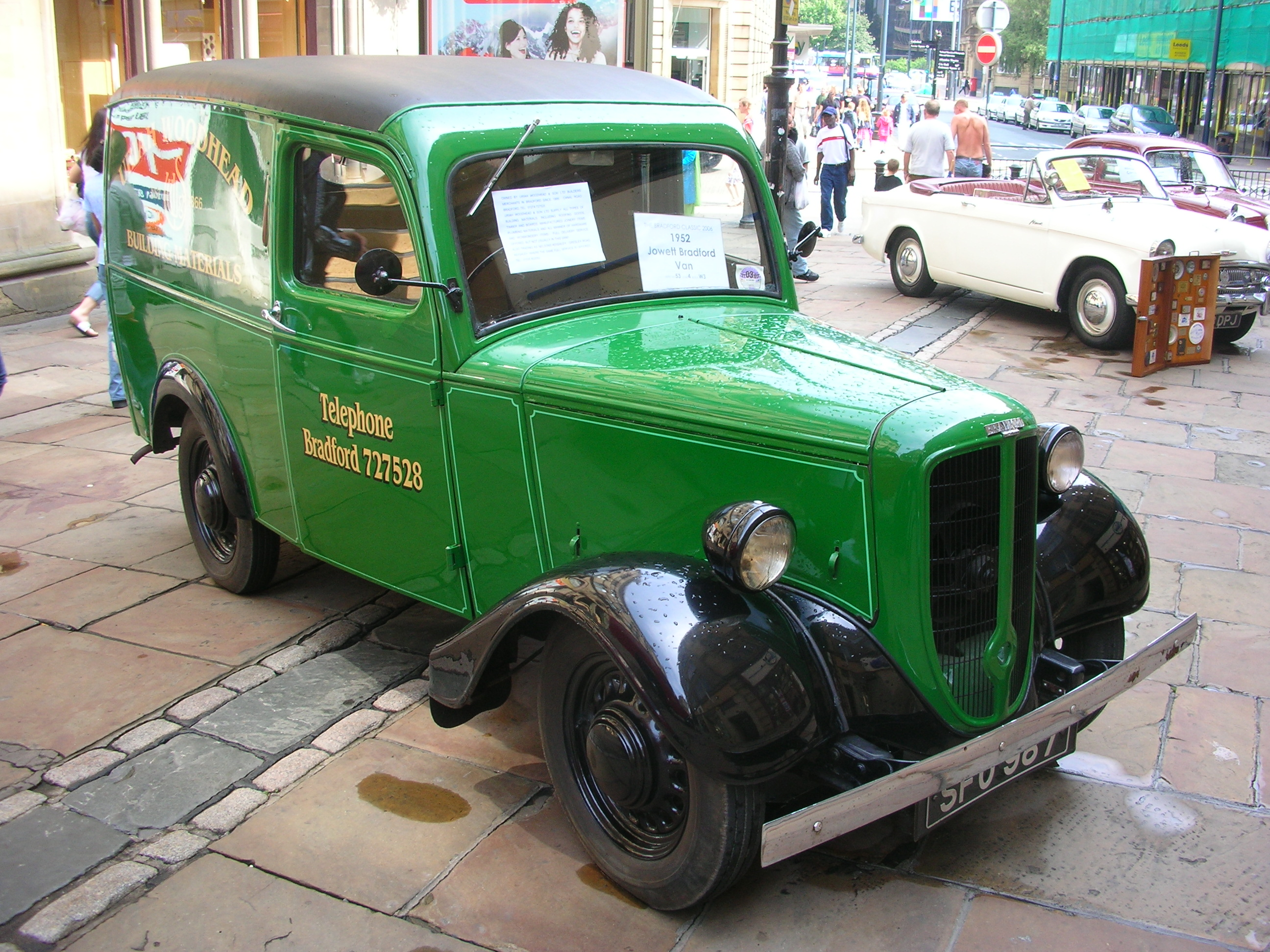

Overview
- Manufacturer: Jowett Cars Ltd
- Production: 1946–1953. 38,241 made

Body and chassis
- Body style: van, estate
- Layout: FR
- Related: Jowett 8

Powertrain
- Engine: Jowett side-valve flat twin, 1005 cc
- Transmission: 3-speed manual

Dimensions
- Wheelbase: 2,286 mm (90 in)
- Length: 3,658 mm (144 in)
- Width: 1,524 mm (60 in)
- Height: 1,753 mm (69 in)

The Jowett Bradford was a British light van produced from 1946 to 1953 by Jowett Cars Ltd of Idle, near Bradford, England. It was also available as an estate car from 1947 to 1953.

The vehicle was based on the pre-war Jowett Eight and was the first Jowett to be re-introduced after the Second World War. Although it was very basic, the Bradford's economy and availability appealed to the post-war market.

== Design features ==
The chassis featured half-elliptic leaf springs front and rear with beam axles. The front-mounted flat-twin engine produced 19 bhp (14 kW) and drove the rear wheels through a three-speed non-synchromesh gearbox. In 1950 the engine was updated to give 25 bhp (19 kW) and synchromesh was fitted to the top ratio. This improved the top speed to 53 mph (85 km/h). The 10 in (254 mm) drum brakes were operated mechanically using a Girling system.

== Body variants ==
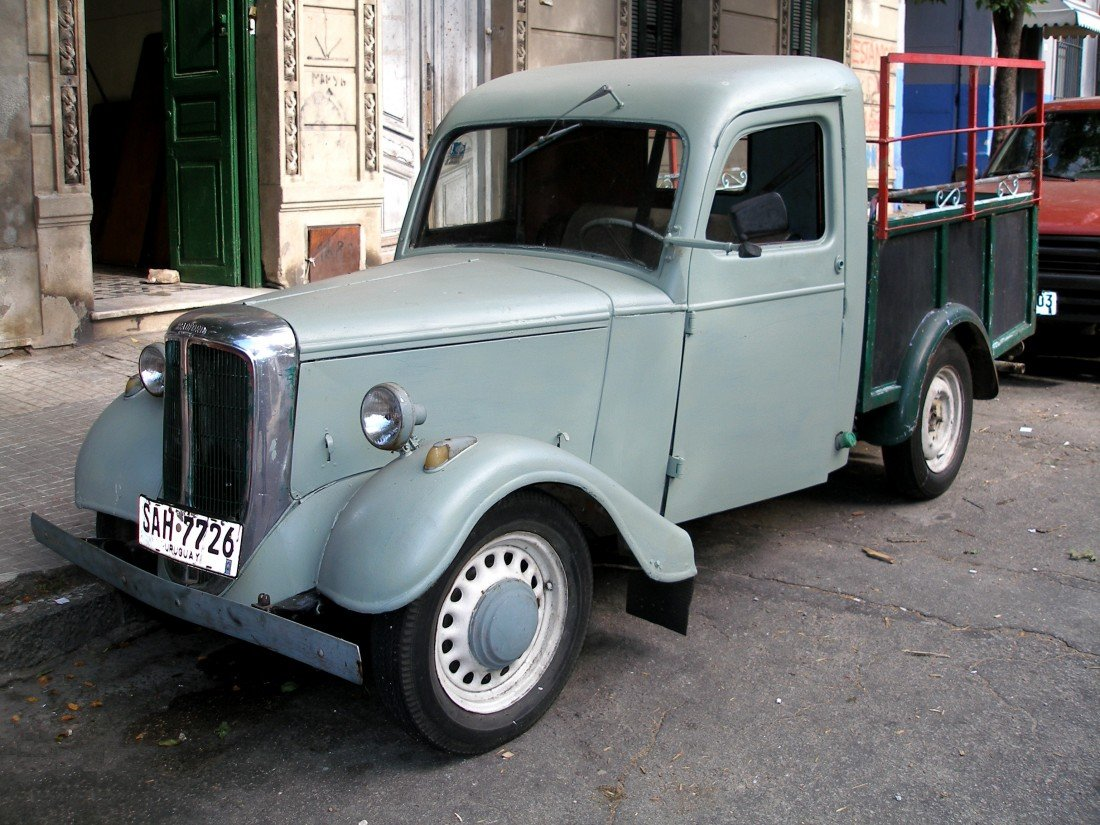
A Jowett Bradford pickup in Uruguay

Initially only a 10 cwt van version was made but in 1947 it was joined by an estate car, the Utility. This was little more than the van with side windows and rear seats. By 1951 the Utility was offered in two versions: Utility and Utility De Luxe, with the latter having better trim, including a rear bumper and side footsteps. Both utilities were also offered as a '4-light van', with windows but no rear seats, to avoid the high purchase tax on private cars. The Bradford was also manufactured as a light lorry, as would later be described as a pickup truck.

Driveaway-chassis and cab-chassis versions were made for outside coachbuilders, in which form it sold in large numbers at home and abroad.

== Performance ==
A Utility de-luxe tested by the British magazine The Motor in 1952 had a top speed of 53.4 mph (85.9 km/h) and could accelerate from 0–50 mph (80 km/h) in 47.6 seconds. A fuel consumption of 34.5 miles per imperial gallon (8.2 L/100 km; 28.7 mpg_{‑US}) was recorded. The test car cost £740 including taxes. The de-luxe specification, which included trafficators, dual windscreen wipers, running boards, a rear bumper and some chromium plating, added £38 to the total cost.

== Development ==
A saloon and a pickup with inlet-over-exhaust cylinder heads were being developed when Jowett stopped making cars and vans.

== Gallery ==
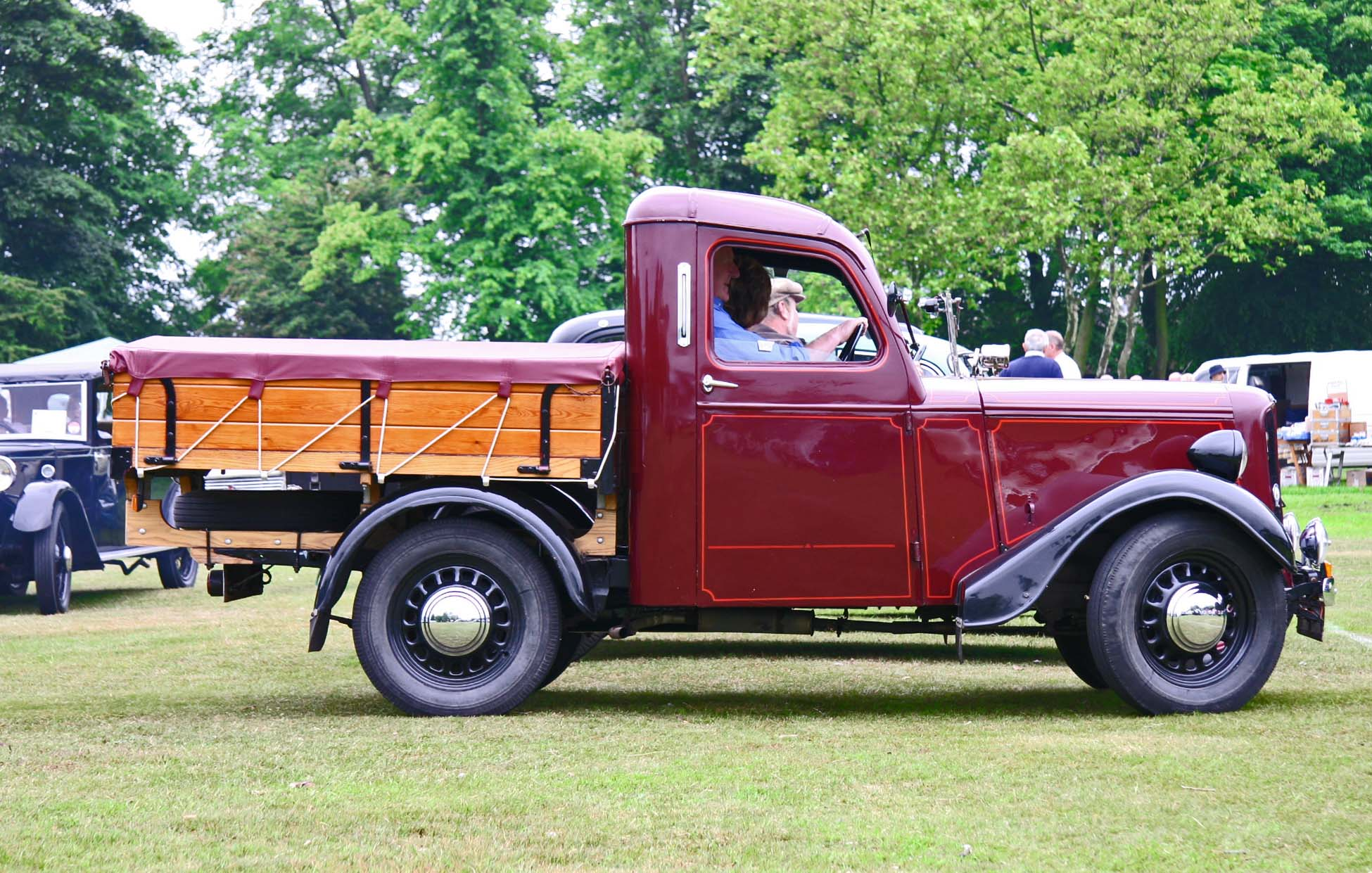
1951 10 cwt (½ ton) lorry

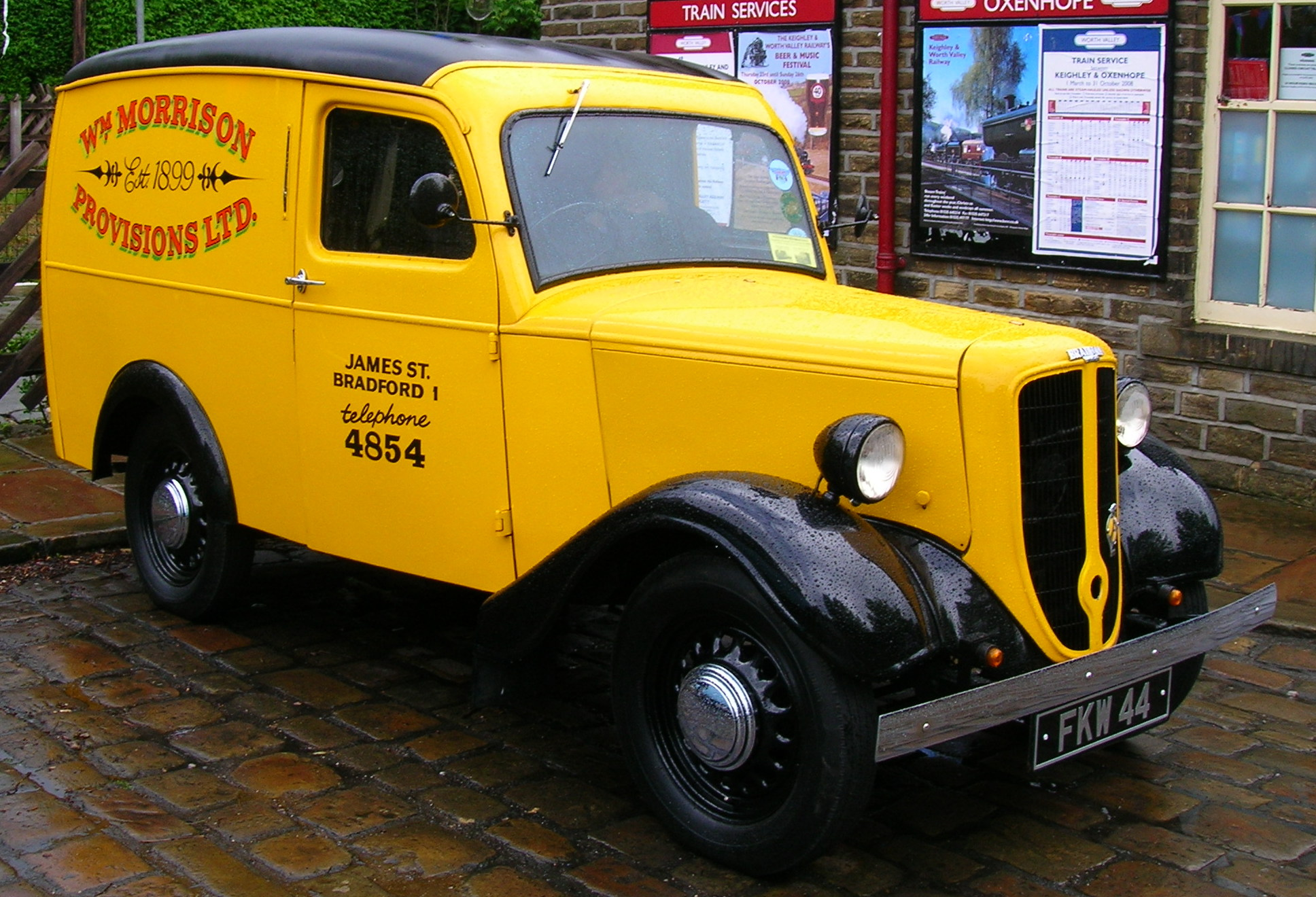
10 cwt (½ ton) van registered October 1948

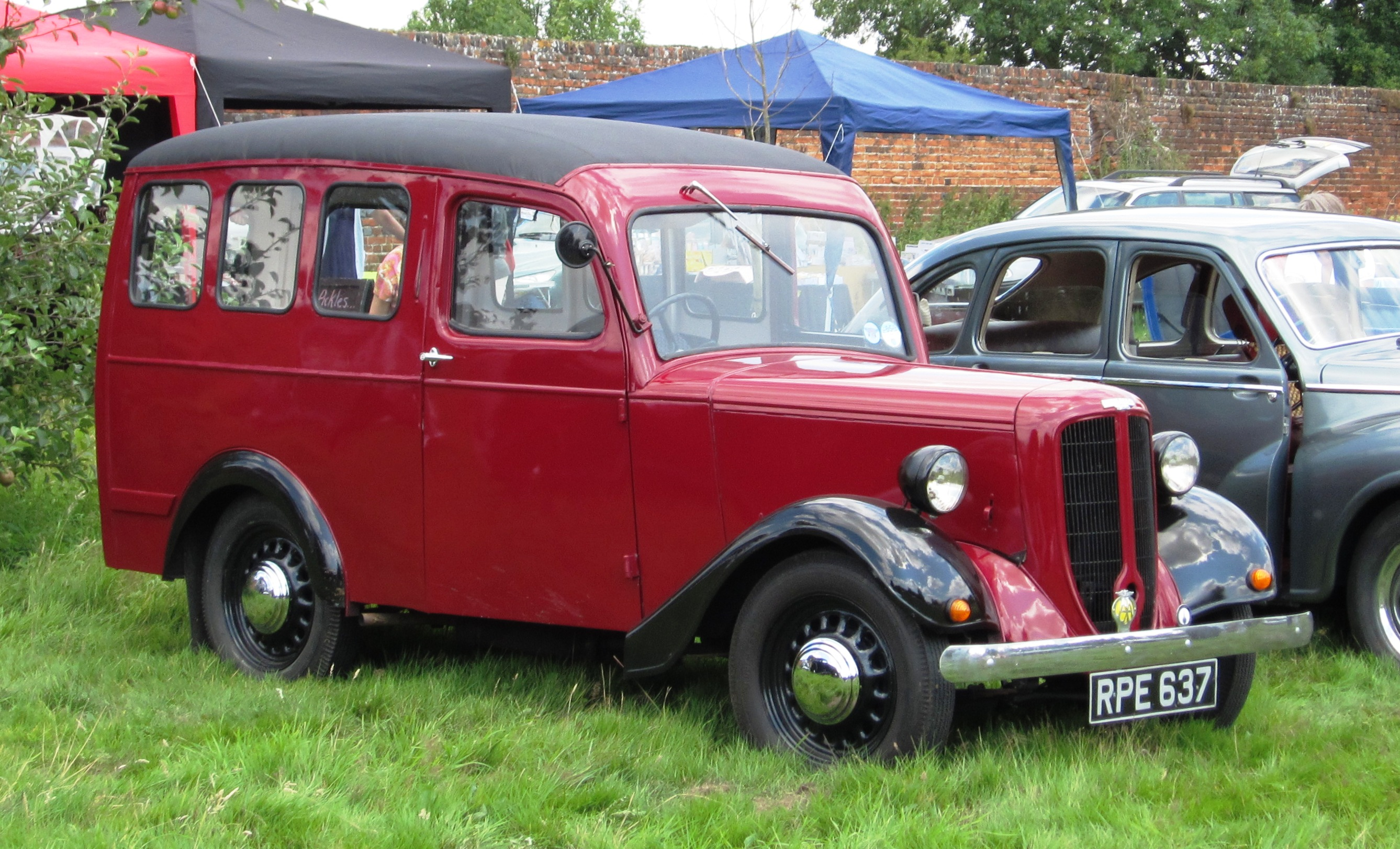
van to "station wagon" private conversion registered March 1952

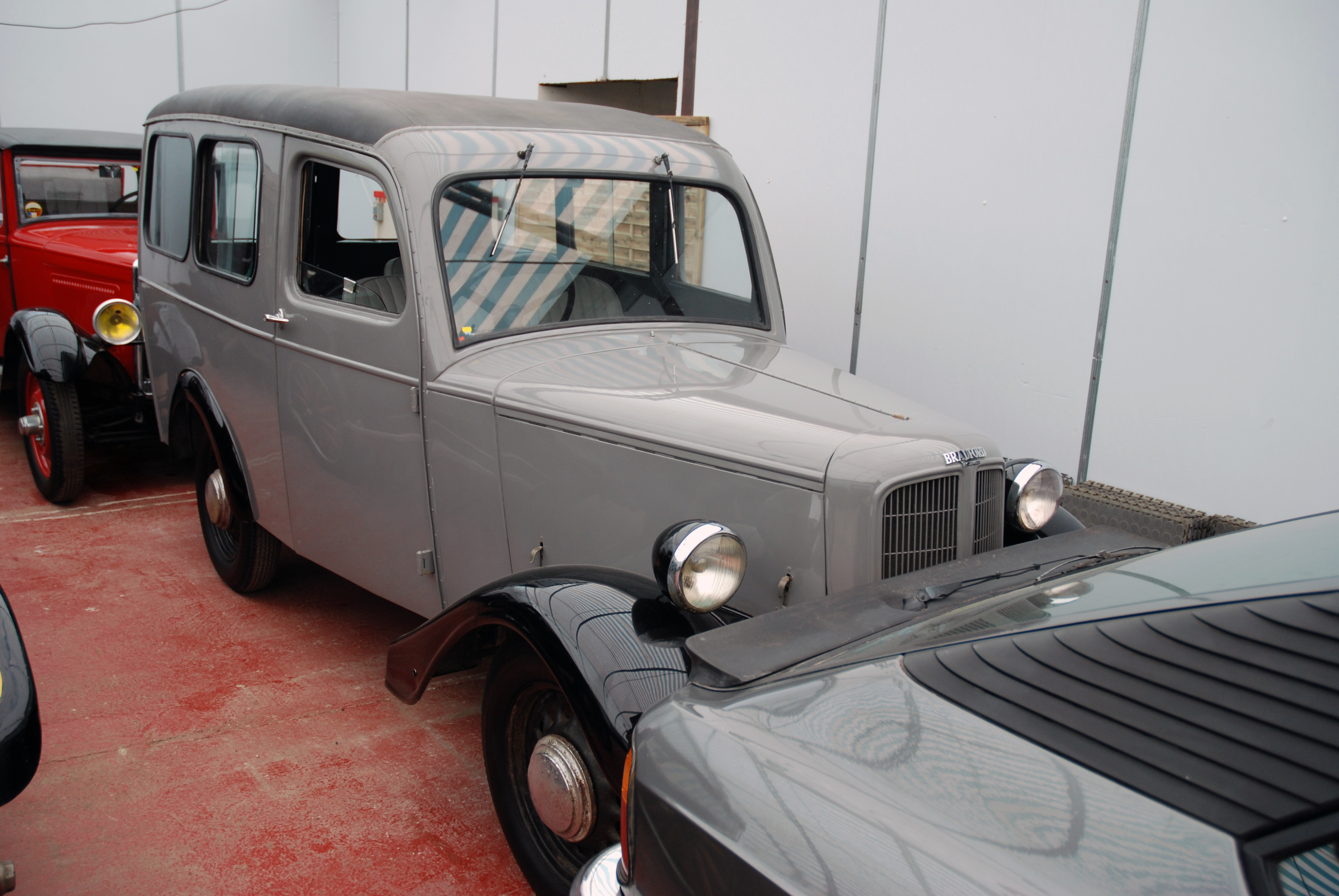
standard 6-light van or Utility Car either 2 or 4 seats registered March 1948 Stondon Museum

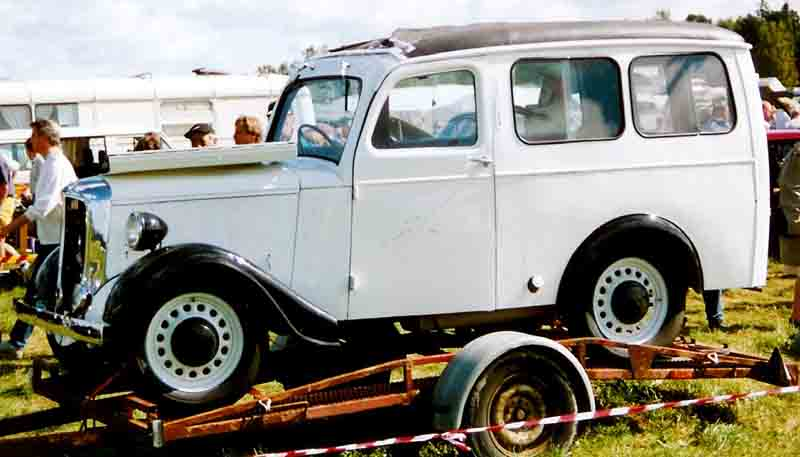
de luxe Utility Car with three rows of two seats and like the standard model 8 cwt springs

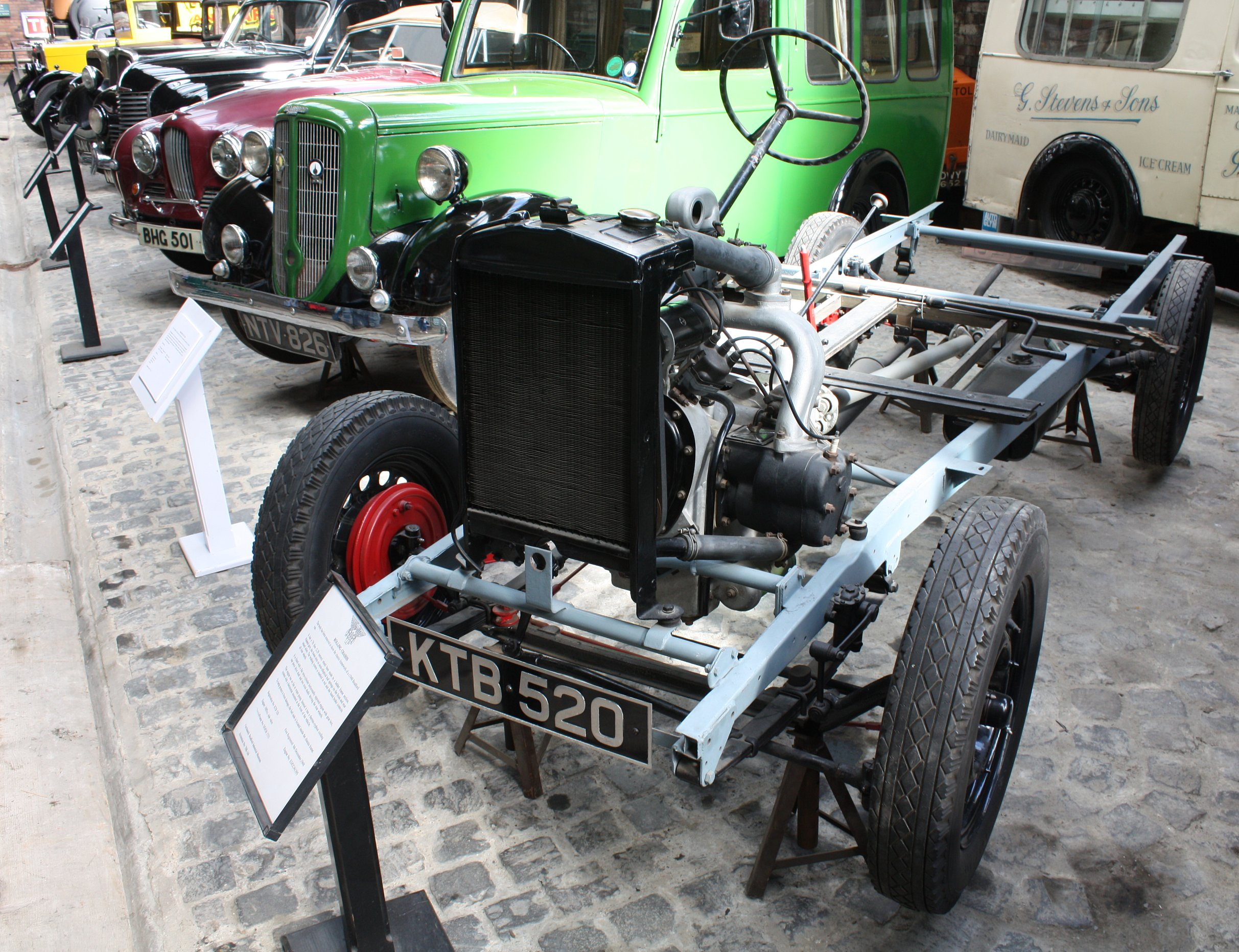
Rolling chassis of a 1948 van

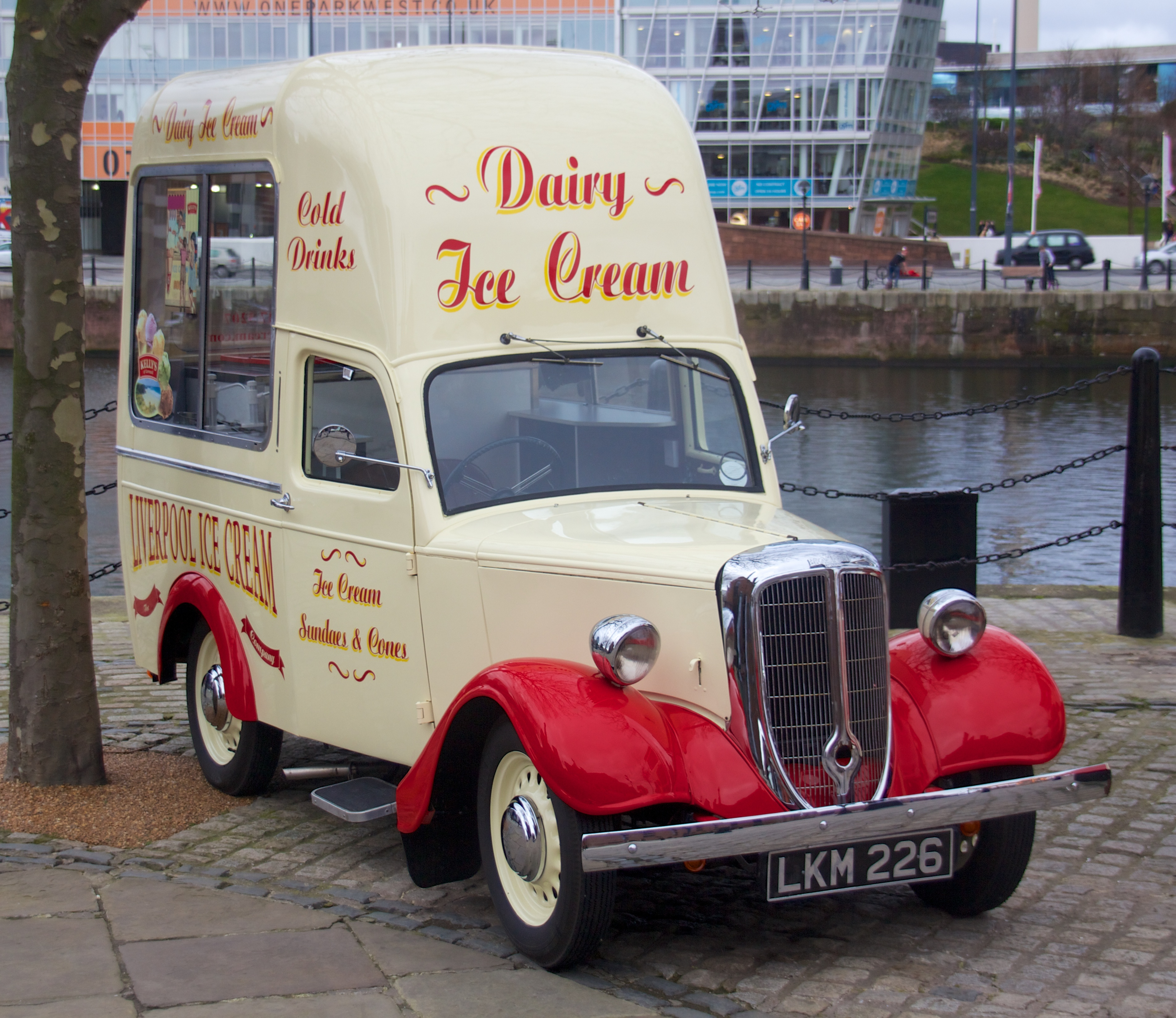
ice cream van in Liverpool

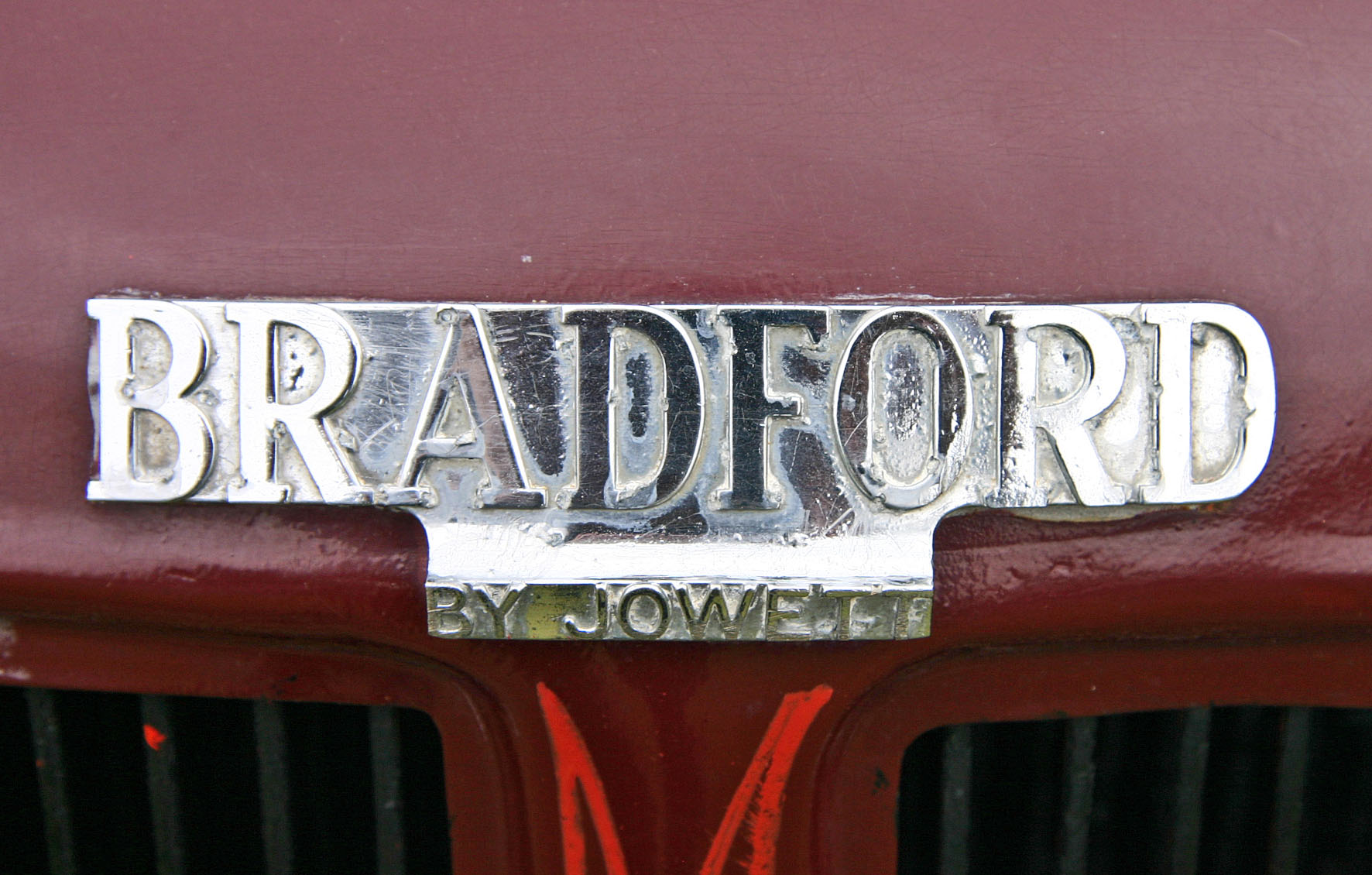
badge

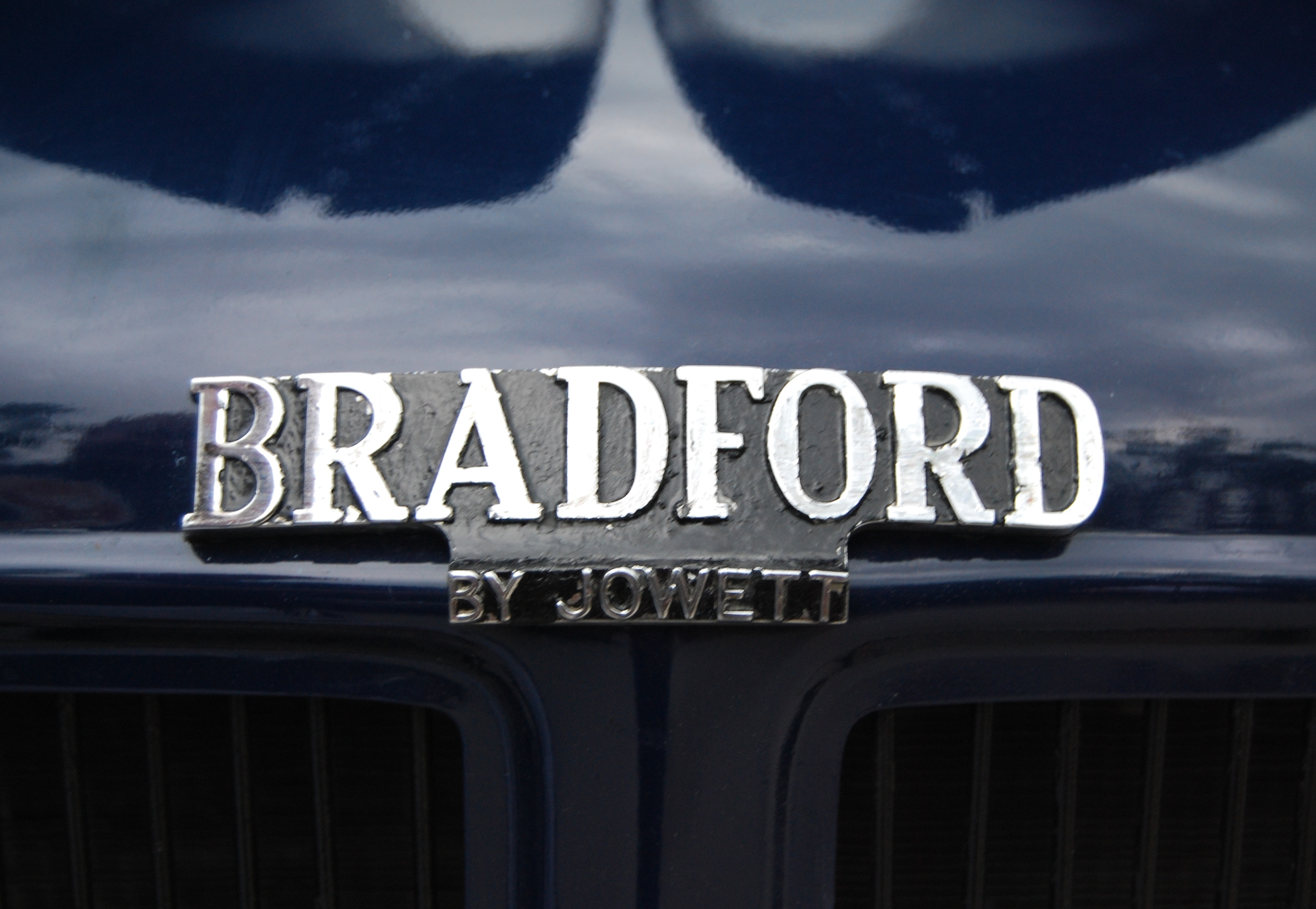
badge

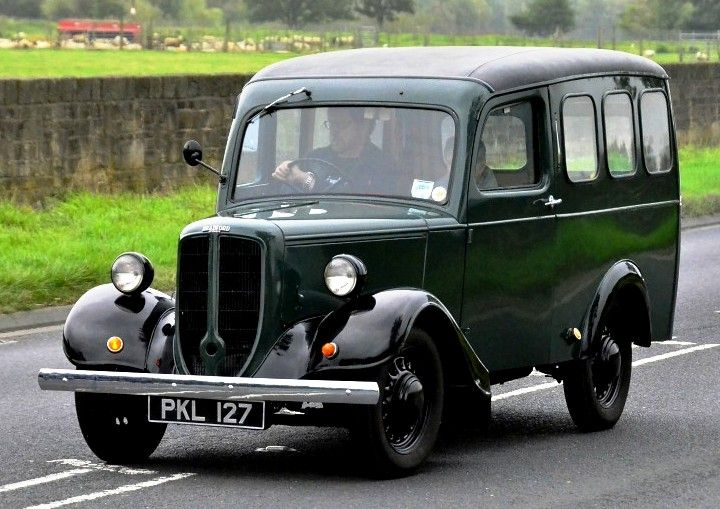
1952 Bradford By Jowett van
