= Bradford Industrial Museum =

Museum in Bradford, England

Coordinates: 53.8114°N 1.7208°W

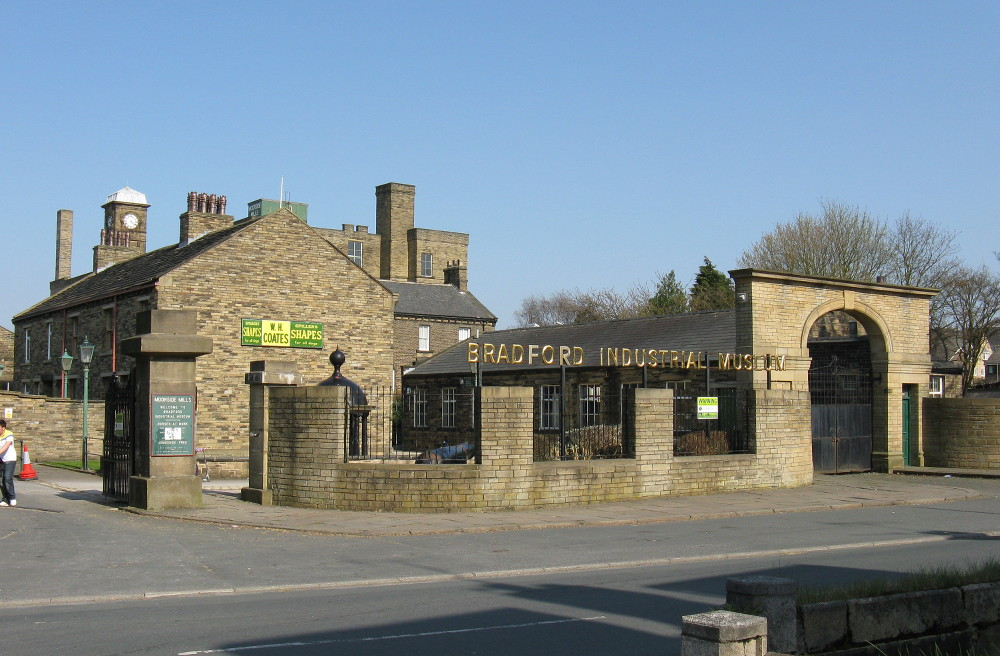
- Museum entrance on Moorside Road
- Established: 1974
- Location: Moorside Mills, Moorside Road, Eccleshill, Bradford BD2 3HP
- Type: Industrial museum, Mill museum, Textile museum,
- Public transit access: Bus and train: Bradford Interchange
- Website: Bradford Industrial Museum

Bradford Industrial Museum, established 1974 and located in Moorside Mills, Eccleshill, Bradford, United Kingdom, specializes in relics of local industry, especially printing and textile machinery, kept in working condition for regular demonstrations to the public. It is owned and operated by Bradford Council.

== History of the site ==
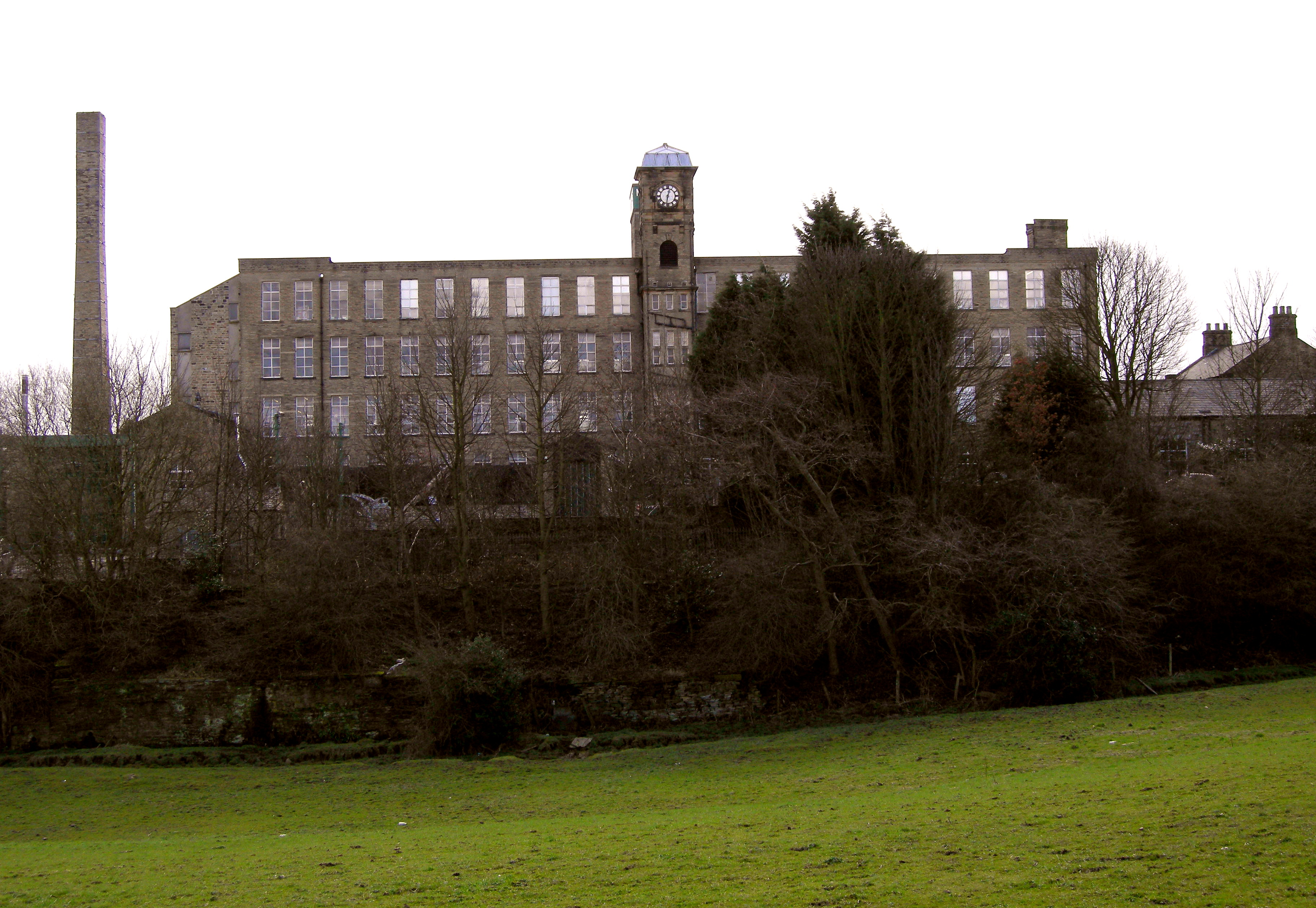
Bradford Industrial Museum from a quarter-mile away, showing size

Moorside Mills was a textile factory built by John Moore in 1875 for worsted spinning, which grew into a medium-sized factory employing around 100 people. The mill, which was originally steam powered, was converted to electricity in the early 20th century. It was bought by Clifford and Arnold Wilson in 1908 who installed a mill engine built by Cole, Marchent and Morley in 1910. The high demand for worsted used for military uniforms during the World War I saw numerous expansions to the factory, including the addition of two extra floors. A clock tower was erected as a war memorial in 1919.

In 1929, the mill was sold to W & J Whitehead, who ran the ring spinning machine which is still in the spinning gallery.

Bradford Council bought the mill in 1970, and it opened as a museum on 14 December 1974.

== Ground floor galleries ==
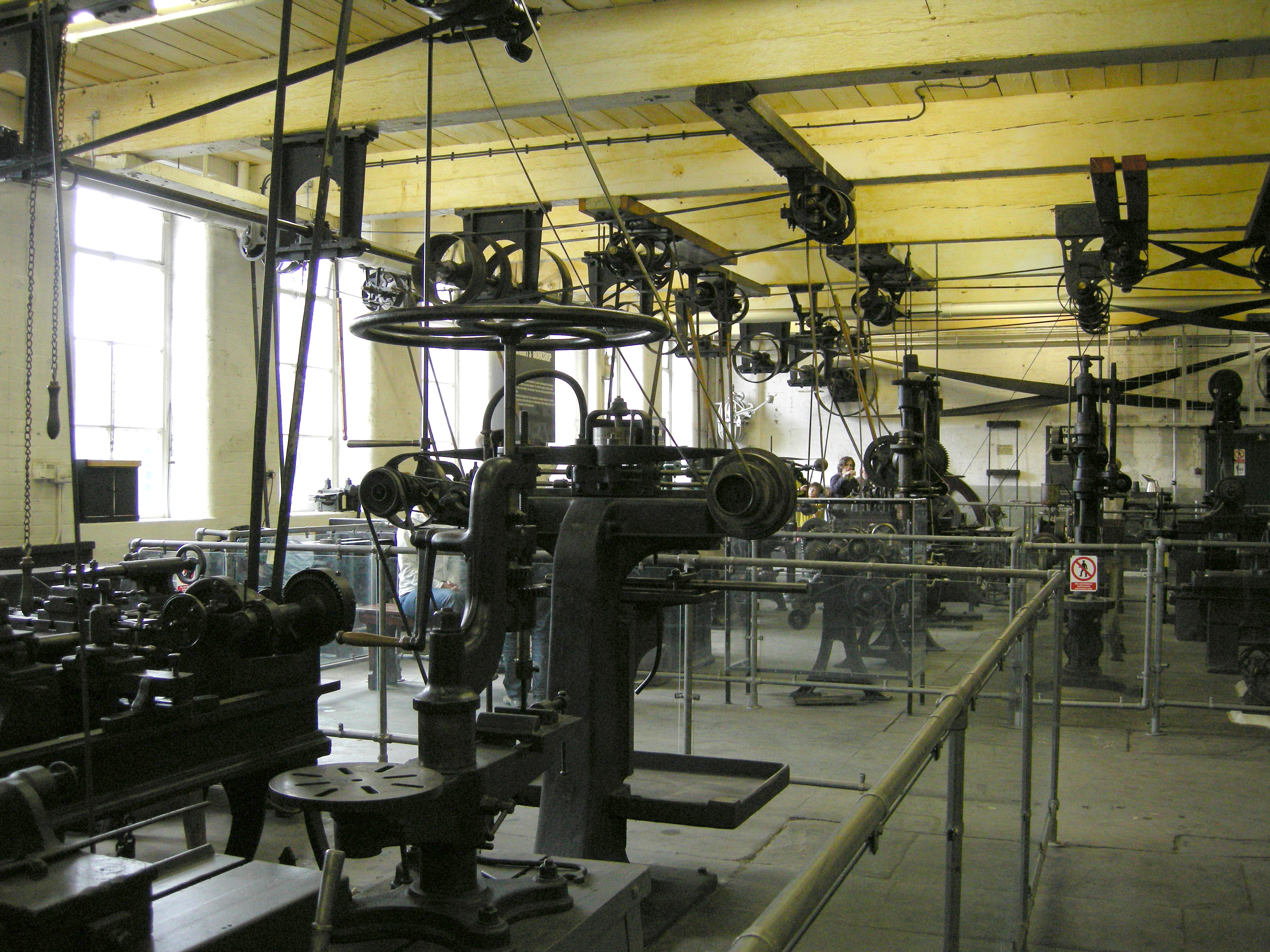
Motive power gallery

=== Motive power ===
This gallery displays machinery from the 19th century Industrial Revolution, including waterwheels, steam engines, oil engines and gas engines; plus an engineer's workshop display. The millstone is from Castlefields corn mill near Bingley; it is a bedstone carved from local millstone grit. A spindle passes through this and a similar upper runner stone; the grain enters via the spindle hole and is ground by the scissor-action of the grooves when the runner stone rotates against the bedstone. The grain is forced out at the outer edges as flour and then flows into a sack. The prime exhibit, a uniflow steam engine rescued from Linton mill and known as the Linton engine, was one of the last Bradford-made steam engines. There is a display explaining the history of steam power.

=== Transport ===
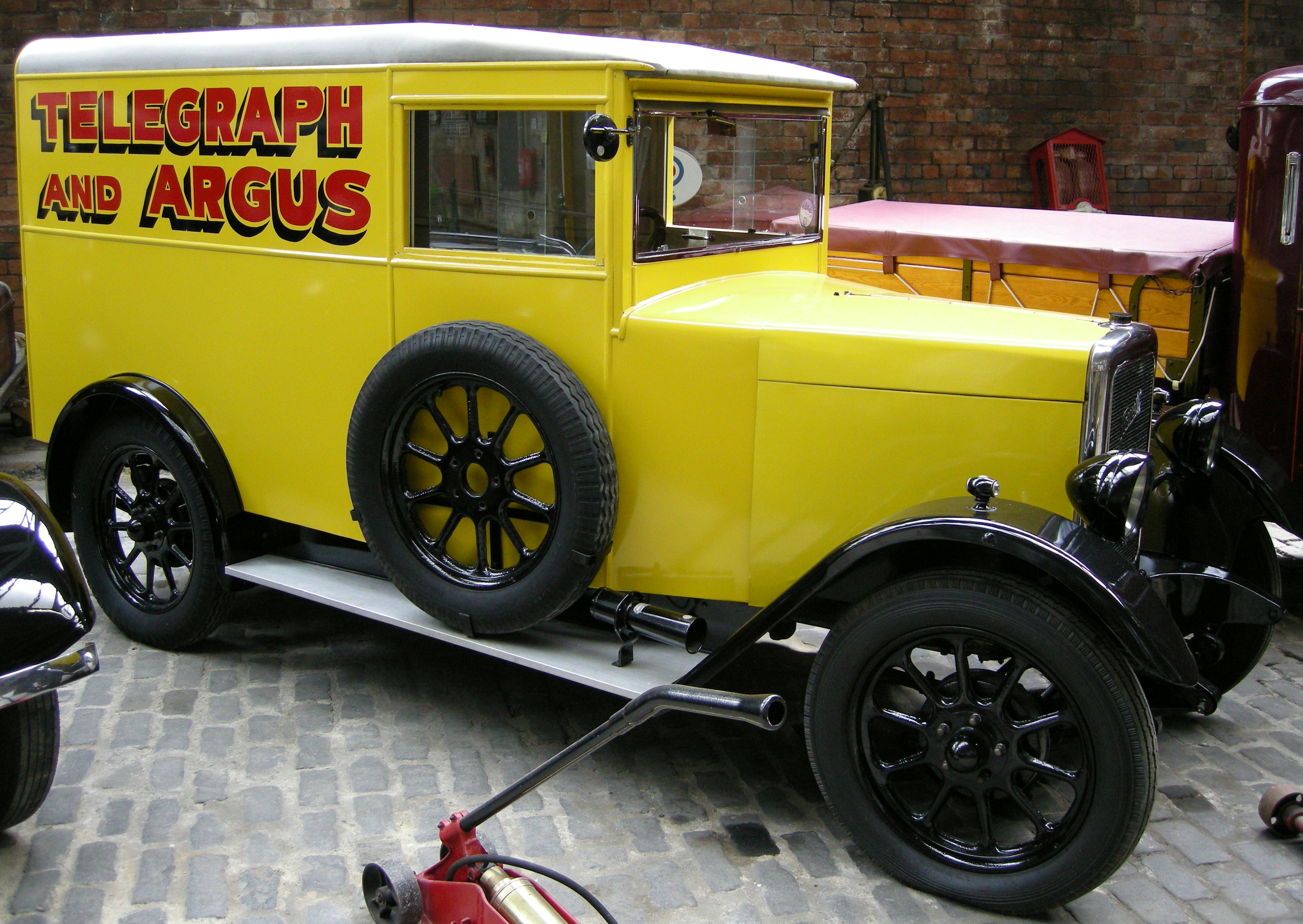
Vintage Jowett Bradford van in Bradford Telegraph and Argus livery

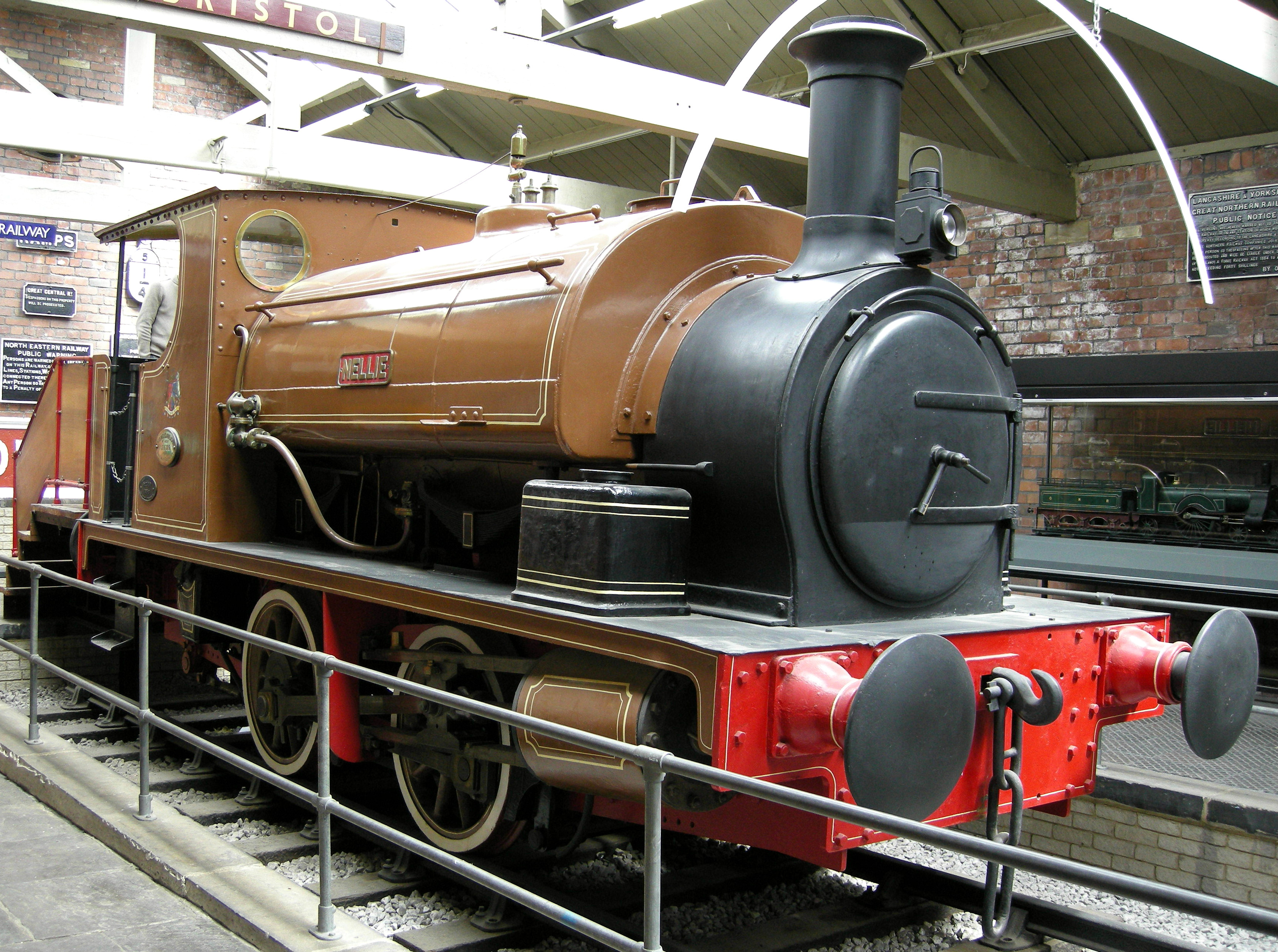
Hudswell Clarke steam locomotive 1435 Nellie, 1922

Most of the space in this gallery is taken up with several examples of cars and light commercial vans built by the Jowett company of Bradford, Scott motorbikes and Baines bicycles. (Note: Made in Idle, West Yorkshire by Baines, famous for producing the Baines Flying Gate.) There is a Wallis & Steevens Advance type Steam Roller no. 7986 that was built in 1928 and owned by Bradford City Council roads department and carries the council crest on the water tanks.

The biggest exhibit is a locomotive named Nellie, after Nellie Crane the vicar's wife. Nellie is an 0-4-0 saddle tank industrial locomotive 1435, one of two built by Hudswell Clarke in Leeds in 1922 for the Esholt sewage works. When the works were being built, she carried excavated material, and thereafter coal and construction material, then coal and other materials until 1970 when she was loaned to the Yorkshire Dales Railway Society at Skipton. Her size is c.23 × 8 × 11 ft, and she weighs 28 tons. The boiler works at 160psi, and she carries 700 gallons in the saddle water tank. The cylinders are 40-inch diameter 20-inch stroke operated by Stephenson's open link valve gear. A British Railways Crane Wagon is on display outside near the museum gates.

In the tram shed is the only tramcar left in Bradford, and a Bradford trolleybus. The first horse-drawn trams were introduced in 1882, followed by steam trams in 1883 and electric trams in 1898. Trolleybuses ran in Bradford from 1911 to 1972. There are various models of trams, including no. 237, built in Shipley in 1904, but shown as it was in 1912 with top deck extended and covered to accommodate 38 passengers. From 1904 to 1908 this tram travelled between Baildon bridge and Greengates. After that, it was transferred to the Great Horton system, then went between Saltaire and Undercliffe. However, its routes were limited as it was too tall to pass under the railway bridge at Eccleshill station.

=== Print ===
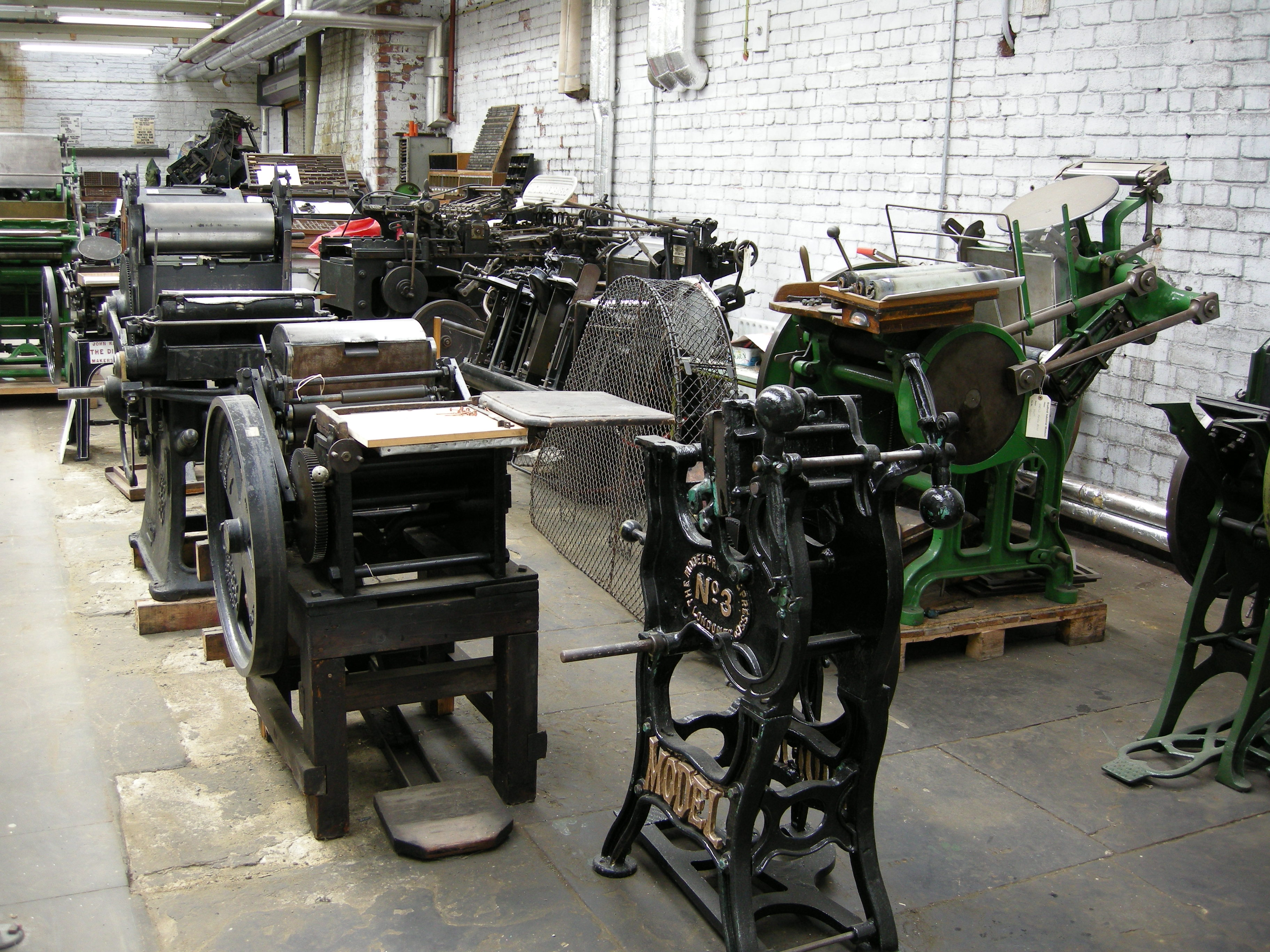
Printing equipment

Here are different types of old machines in working condition; plus printing equipment.

This gallery holds machinery from the last of the hot metal typesetting printshops as used in the newspaper industry. The monotype keyboard produces punched 31-level tape for casting on the monotype caster. The keyboard comprises seven QWERTY arrangements (Roman upper and lower case, bold upper and lower case, italic upper and lower case and small capitals). It is operated by compressed air and produces a wide paper tape that contains perforations that when transferred to the caster give full instructions for each character to be cast. The monotype system was widely used in the commercial printing sector. There is a "forme" (text lines produced on a Linotype typesetting machine) made up into the front page of the last edition of the Yorkshire Sports, 2 May 1981. The assembled forme is ready to be moulded and cast into a curved printing plate.

There is a display of lead glyphs for typesetting. These would be set into a forme so that the text read backwards and upside down, then inked and pressed against paper using a platen in a printing press. The display includes various kinds of printing presses, including a Wharfedale stop cylinder press.

== First floor textile galleries ==
In the 19th century, Bradford was famous for its worsted cloth, although life was hard for the workers. The displays show how a fleece was transformed through various stages into a suit.

=== Spinning gallery ===
==== Preparing ====
Preparing is the process used in place of carding for long wools and hairs which would break on the card and therefore greatly reduce the quality of the worsted yarn produced. The museum displays machinery used for this process. The maker-up or double-screw sheeting preparer is the first machine. This passes the fibre to and from delivery sheets via rollers and ends with a lap of wool from six to eight feet long. The single screw can preparer is the most important machine of these, as it is here that the laps of wool or hair taken from the preceding boxes are prepared into a continuous sliver. This process prepares the material for the combing machine.

==== Combing ====
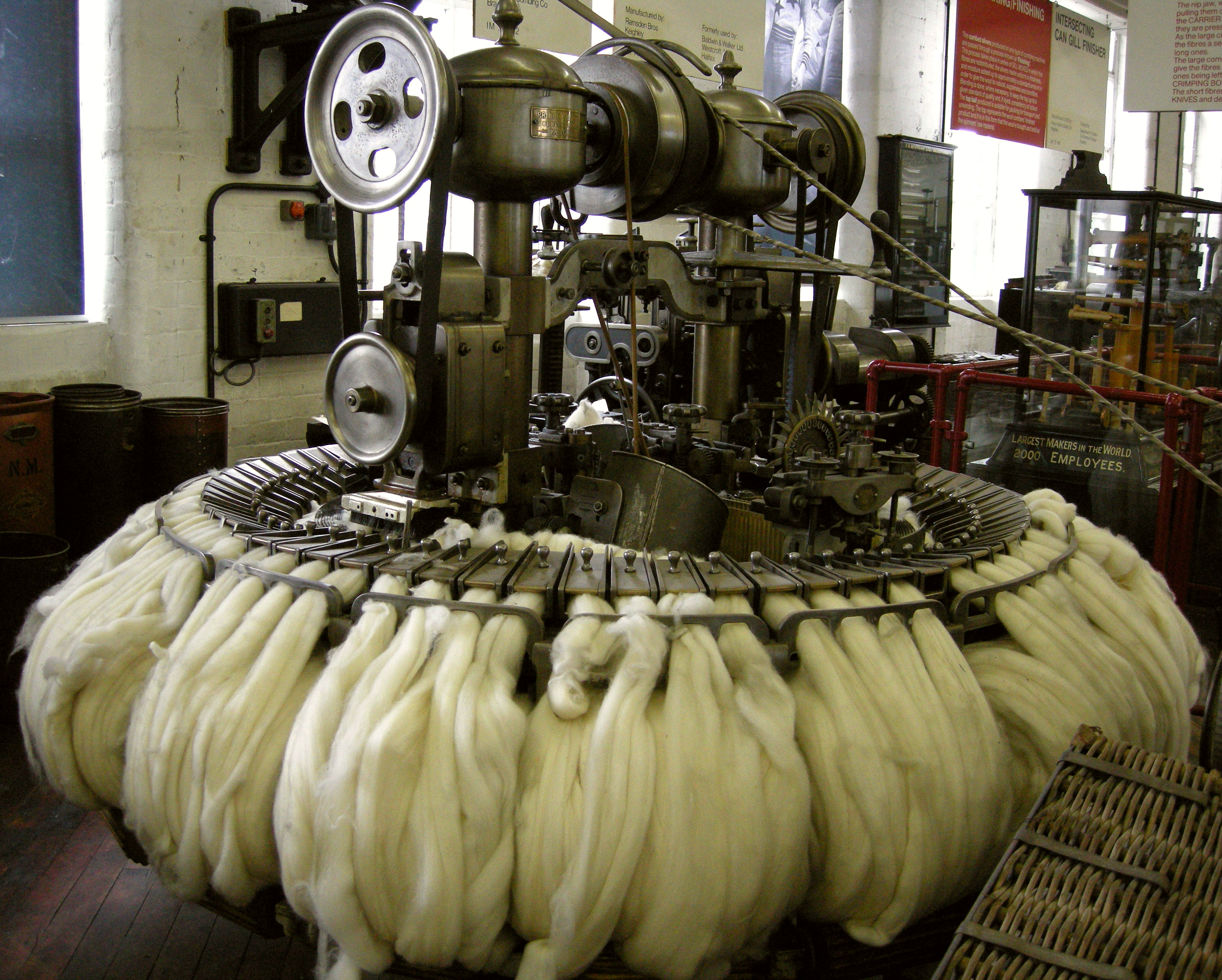
Noble comb

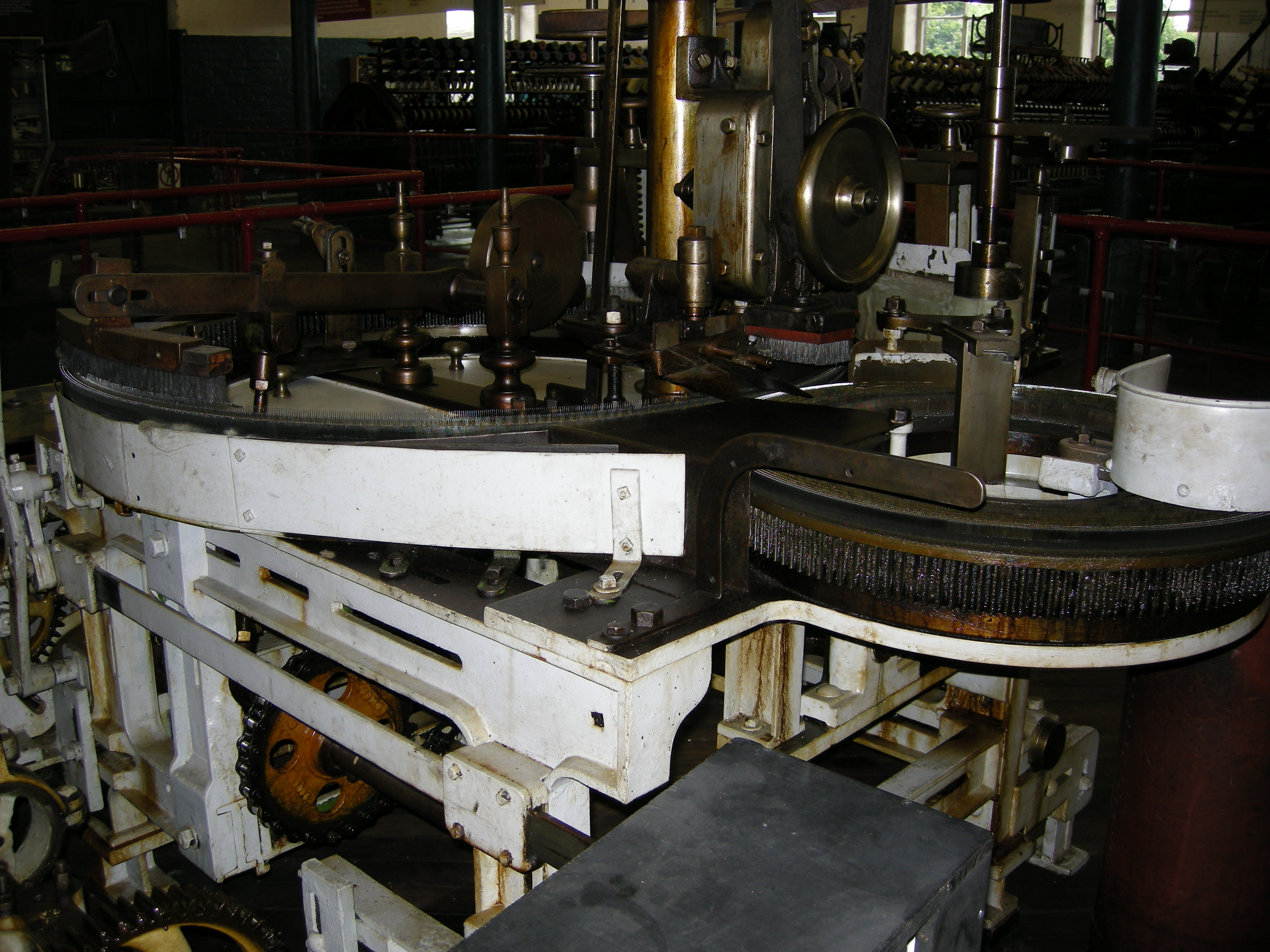
Lister comb

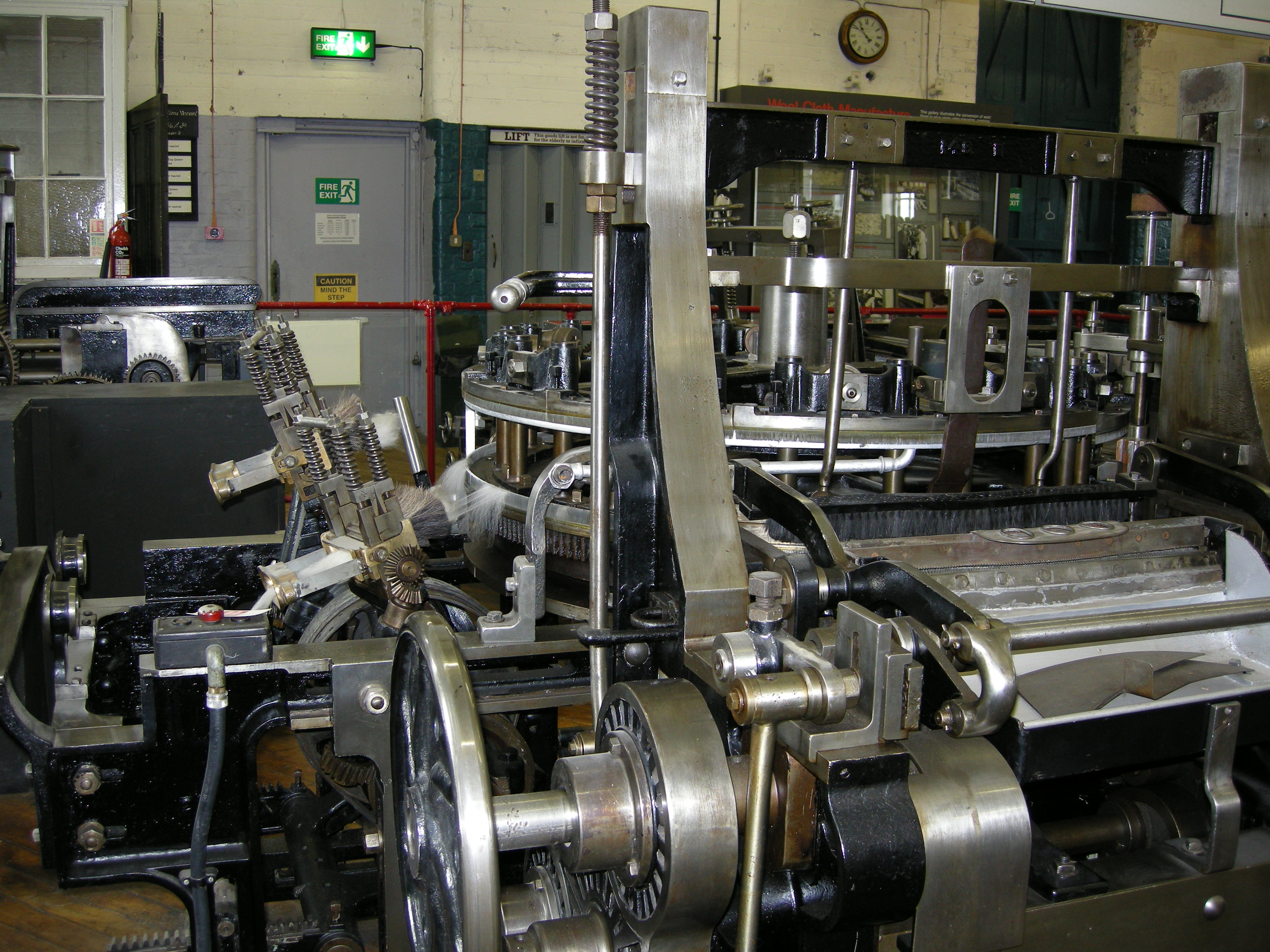
Holden comb, made in 1914

Combing straightens the fibres, isolates the long ones (tops) for spinning and discards the short ones (noil). There are various types of combing machines here, including the French comb, the Lister comb and the Holden comb. The Noble comb was the most popular as it would comb long, medium and fairly short staple wool, but the slivers needed special preparation in a punching machine beforehand.

In the French comb, the slivers of wool are fed forward by ratchet-operated rollers and a pinned feed grid, the leading end of the fibres being pushed beyond the nipper jaws which open and shut to receive and hold them, leaving a fringe of fibres protruding through which the pins of the revolving cylinder comb pass, removing the short fibres or noil and any impurities. The drawing-off rollers, mounted on a carriage, grip the fringe of fibres projecting it from the nipper jaws. The intersector comb then descends, piercing the fringe of fibres, the nipper jaws open and the fibres are given their second combing by the rotation and recession of the drawing-off rollers. The combed fibres are then conveyed into a can that is placed directly underneath.

The Lister comb is used when the best results were wanted from long fibred wools and hairs such as mohair, alpaca, long English, and crossbred wools. The slivers of wool or hair are fed into the machine, through rollers, and onto the pins of the fallers which disentangle and transport the fibres to the nip jaw. The nip jaw, with its swinging motion, pulls the fringe of fibres out from the faller pins which are partially combed as they are conveyed to the pins of the large combing circle. As the large circle rotates, the unique feature of the machine, the side circle comb gives the fibres a secondary combing to remove excessively long fibres. The large comb circle carries the remaining fibres to the drawing-off rollers which give the fibres their final combing by removing the long fibres from the circle pins, with the short ones being left behind. The long fibres or top pass through a revolving funnel to the crimping box and into a can directly underneath. The short fibres or noils are removed from the pins of the large comb circle by lifting knives, and deposited into a can ready for removal.

The Holden comb was suited for the combing of short staple wools. The slivers of wool are fed into the machine through the feed guides to the filing head rollers and transferred to the pins of the comb circle by the lashing action of the filling heads. As the comb circle rotates, the fallers of the square motion rise, giving the fibres their initial combing and removing any short fibres or noil and some long fibres termed robbings. The comb circle carries the remaining fibres to the drawing-off head where the fringe is penetrated by the pins of the intersecting or nacteur combs. Here the drawing-off rollers giving the fibres their final combing, removing the long fibres and leaving the short ones behind. The long fibres or top pass through a revolving funnel to the coiler mechanism and into a can directly underneath. The short fibres or noils remaining in the nacteur combs are transferred to the comb circle by a small comb and removed with the noil in the comb circle pins by brushes and lifting knives.

==== Drawing and finishing ====
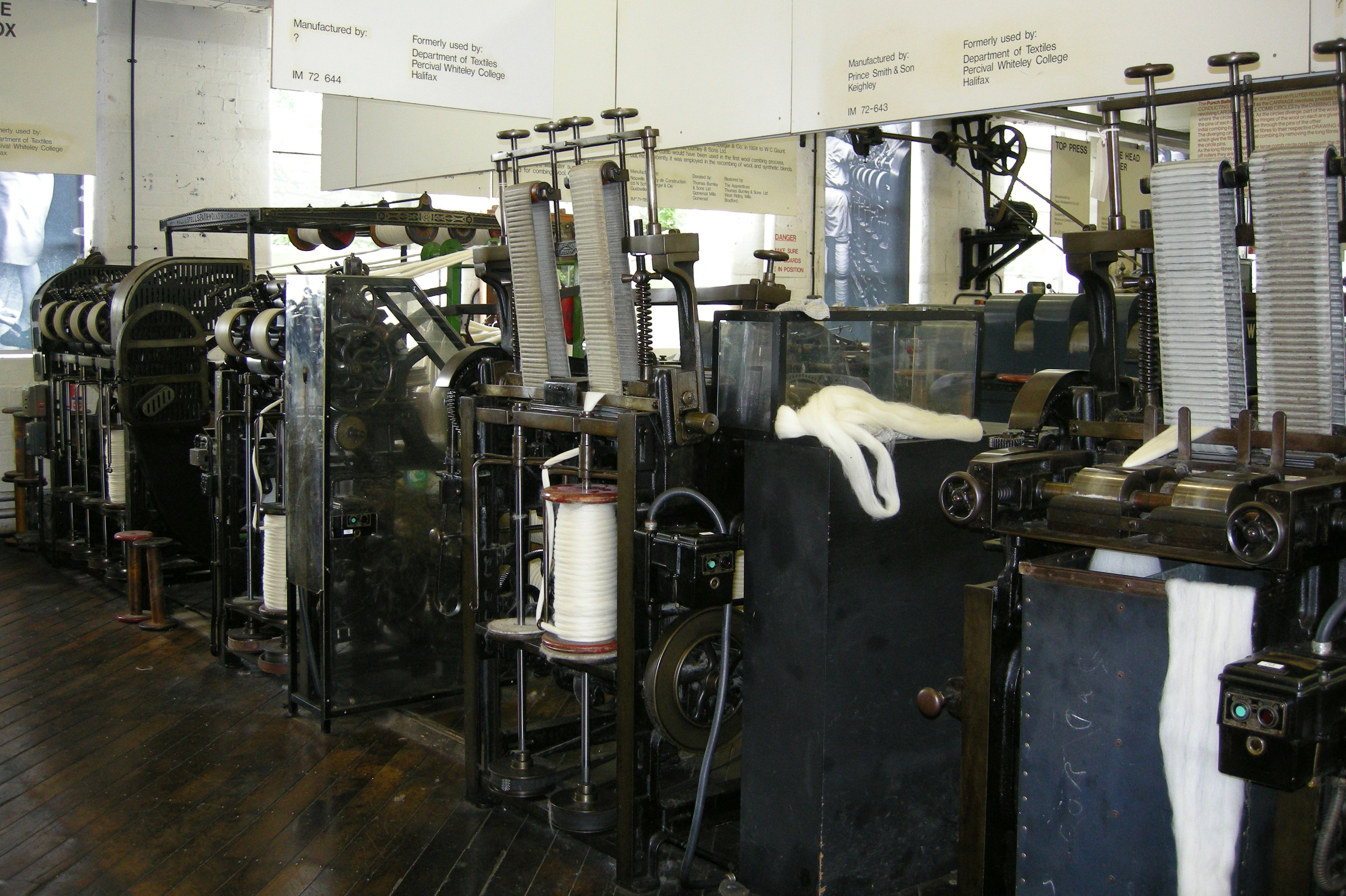
Gill boxes or drawing machines

The machines, known as boxes, in the drawing section, reduce the combed tops from thick slivers to thinner roving ready for spinning. This is done by drafting them between slow back rollers to faster front rollers, and controlling the fibres between these rollers. The first boxes where the ends are thickest are the double-head can gill box (where the wool ends up in a can) and the 2-spindle gill box (where the wool ends up twisted and on spindles). On these machines, the rollers are heavily fluted to control the sliver, and the front rollers are padded with leather to cushion the wool. Between the front and back rollers are fallers or bars that control the roving by holding it with fine pins. The roving is now called slubbing which needs twist for strength, and is dealt with by a second set of boxes: a 2-spindle draw-box, 4-spindle weigh box, 8-spindle finisher/reducer and 8-spindle rover. In these boxes, the principle of two sets of rollers with controlled fibre in between is the same, but the yarn is now twisted onto a bobbin via a flyer.

The combed slivers produced on any type of combing machine are passed through a process known as finishing. This process takes place in a series of gill boxes in which the fibres are redistributed, the slivers made uniform in thickness, and moisture added in order to give the wool its natural suppleness and condition. Blending is done where necessary to keep the top up to a given standard of quality and, if dyed, consistency of colour. The top ball produced is suitable for packing for transport and unwinding. The top represents the wool comber's finished product, and it is in this form that the wool is bought and sold as the spinner's raw material.

==== Spinning ====
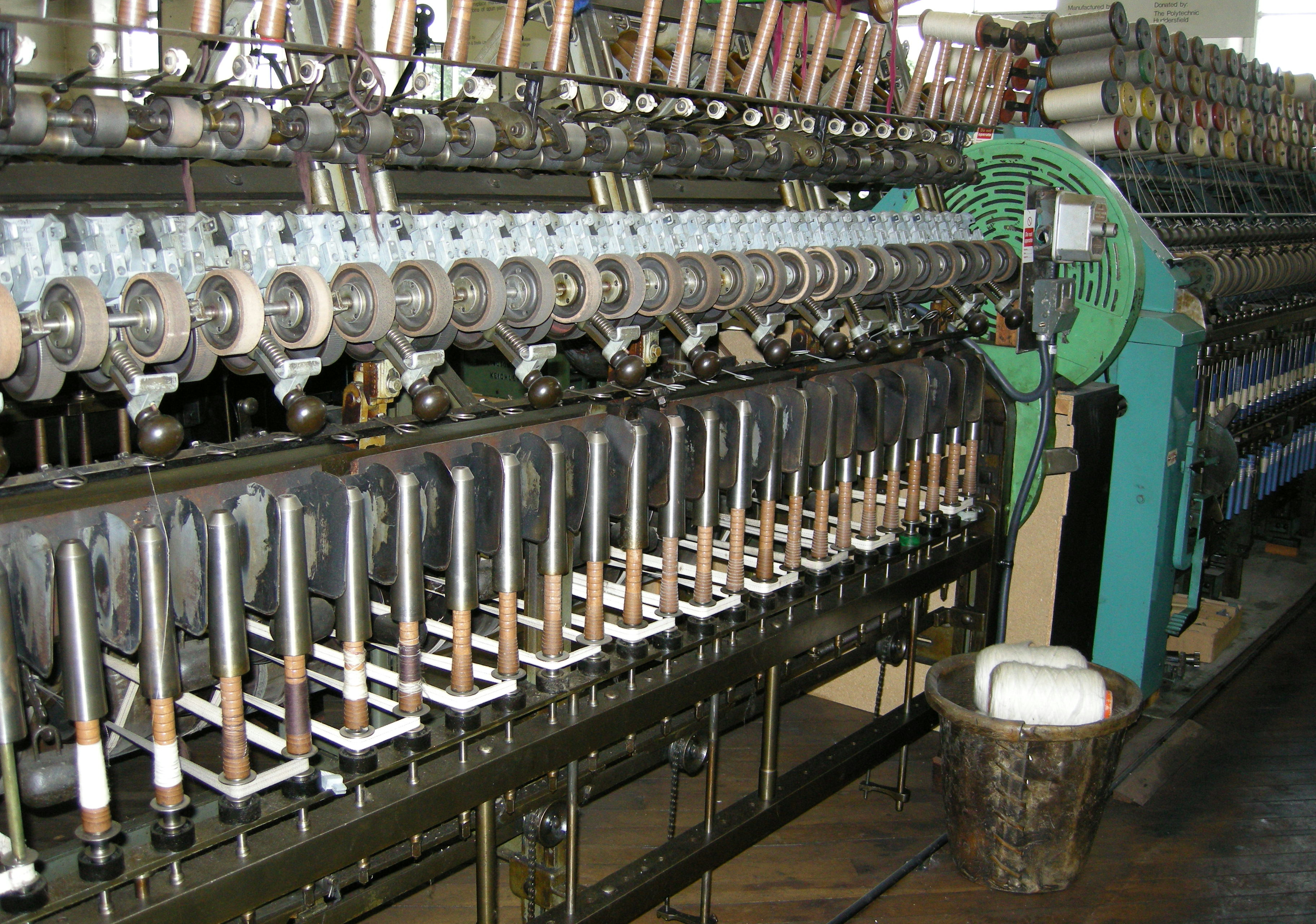
Spinning machines

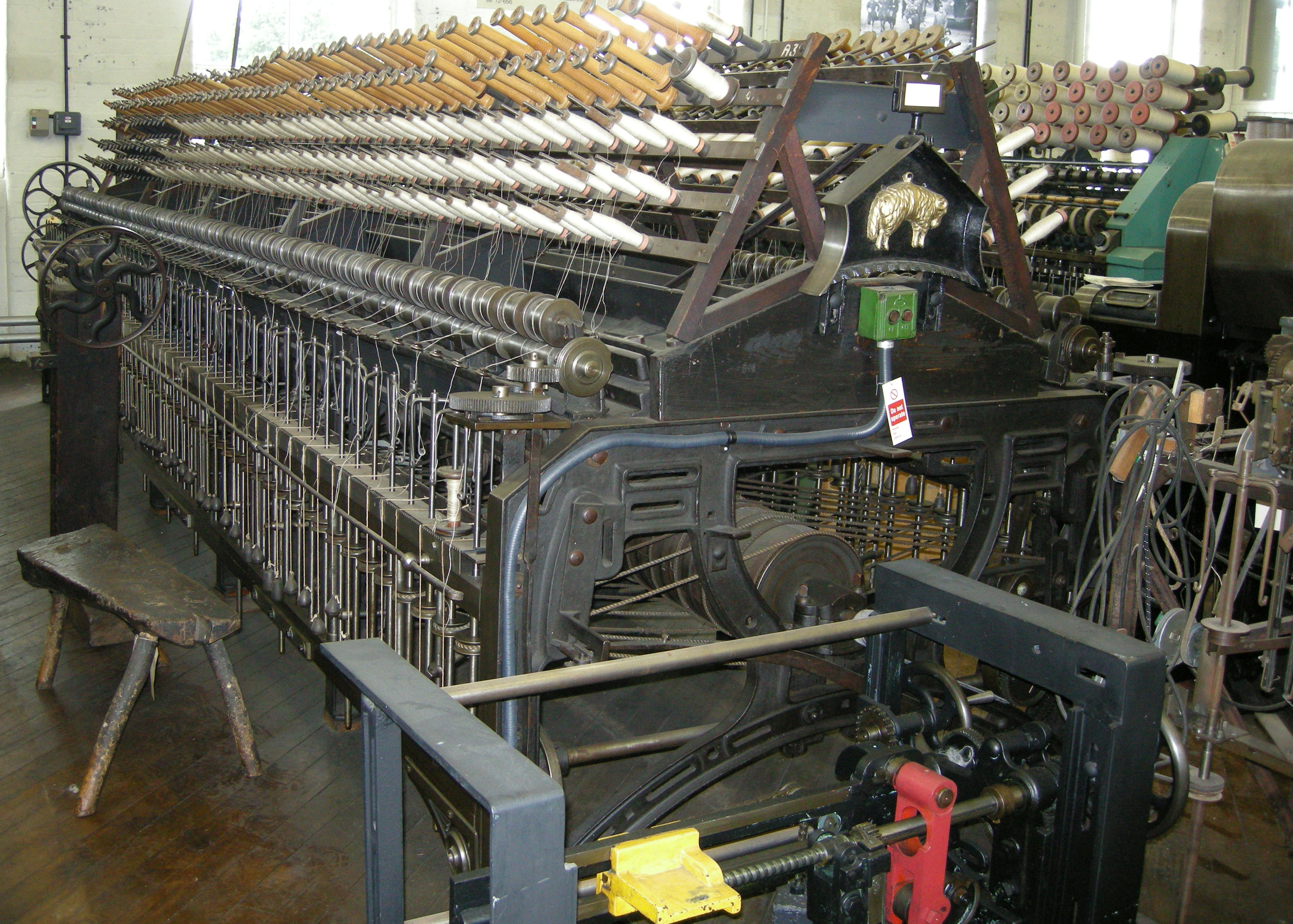
122-spindle flyer twister

Spinning is the final stage in converting wool to worsted yarns, the roving being drawn out to its final thickness and twist added for strength. There are three types of spinning machines or frames in common use in the United Kingdom, namely flyer, cap and ring. Another machine used for spinning worsted yarns is the worsted mule. All three types of machine or frame are similar in their method of drawing out or drafting the roving to make the required count or thickness but differ in the way in which twist is imparted and the yarn wound onto the bobbin. Drafting takes place between the back and front rollers. The front rollers revolve faster than the back ones, drawing out the roving to the fineness of yarn required. Between the rollers are carriers that support and help to control the fibres as they are being drafted.

Examples of flyers include a 120-spindle flyer spinner and a 122-spindle flyer twister. The flyer is the original type of mechanical spinning frame and is believed to be a direct development of the Saxony wheel used in hand spinning. It is suitable for producing thick smooth yarns from coarse quality wools and hairs, but is falling into disuse because of the low speed at which the spindles have to run. On the flyer spinner as the yarn leaves the front rollers it is guided through a porcelain ring to the top of a revolving spindle, around and down one of the arms of the flyer, and onto the bobbin. The bobbin is carried on a lifter plate and moves up and down the spindle. As the flyer revolves, imparting twist to the yarn, the bobbin which is free to rotate on the spindle is pulled round by the spun yarn. A felt or cloth washer is placed between the lifter plate and bobbin to retard the revolving bobbin and create adequate yarn tension for the flyer to wind the yarn evenly on the bobbin. When the bobbins are full they are removed and replaced by empty ones. This action is termed doffing and is done manually. Twisting is the process in which two or more single-spun yarns are united to produce a yarn of greater strength for use as warp threads in the weaving process and for normal knitting purposes. This is done by rollers delivering the yarns to a revolving spindle which twists or folds the single yarns around one another. The machines used are similar to spinning frames in their method of applying twist but differ in that they have only one set of delivery rollers instead of the usual complement of drafting rollers. This machine is an early example of a flyer-twisting frame. On the flyer twister, twist imparted to the yarn in a similar manner as on the flyer spinner. A weighted band, running in a groove at the base of the bobbin, retards the revolving bobbin creating enough tension for the flyer to wind the yarn evenly onto the bobbin. The machine is hand-doffed.

The introduction of the cap frame in c.1828 was a step forward in attaining higher production and finer yarn spinning. It is suitable for producing yarns made from botany and fine crossbred quality wool. Unlike the flyer frame where the spindle and flyer rotate, on the cap frame, the spindle is stationary and carries a steel cap. Moving up and down the spindle is a lifter plate that carries the spinning tube on which the bobbin fits. The revolving tube and bobbin impart twist to the yarn until it becomes strong enough to wind onto the bobbin. The speed of the bobbin causes the thread to balloon, and the air resistance to this balloon, combined with friction on the cap edge, is sufficient to give enough tension for winding on at the line of the cap edge as the bobbin moves up and down inside the cap. The 64-spindle cap spinner on display is hand-doffed. (Note: A doffer, often a child, was a remover of full bobbins.)

The museum also has a 24-spindle velox ring spinner which was a later development of the ring spinning frame. The passage of the yarn from the front rollers to the paper tube – used in place of a bobbin – is different from other types of spinning frames. When the yarn leaves the rollers it passes direct to the top of an elongated spindle and coils around it two or three times before forming a balloon to the ring traveller. This enables the twist to be imparted between the spindle top and roller nip, thus helping to produce a smoother yarn.

=== Weaving gallery ===
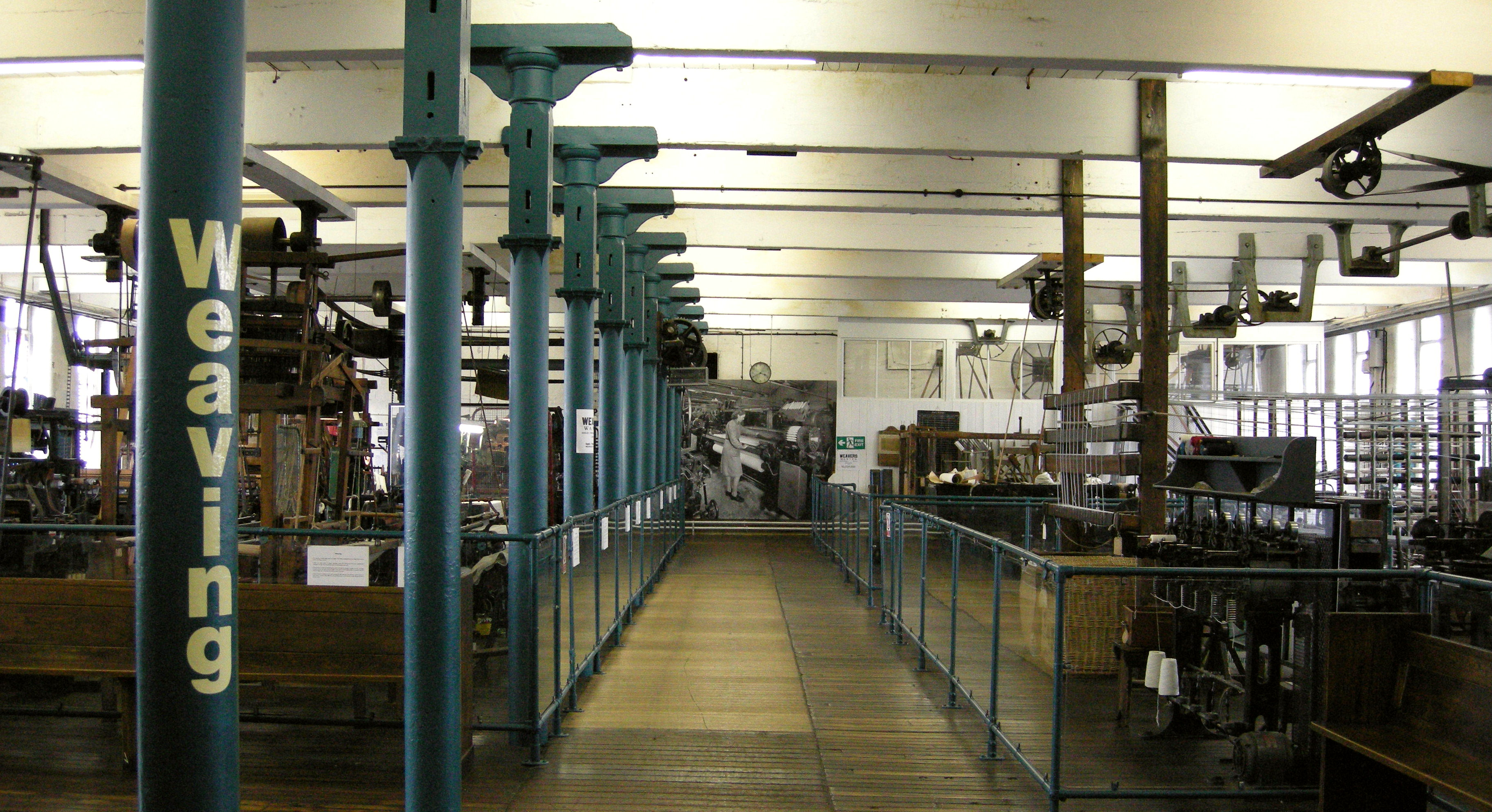
The weaving gallery

The era of Industrial Revolution weaving machinery gave rise to technological jargon in places such as Yorkshire with a strong local dialect. The resultant inscrutability of linguistic terms has given rise to such jokes as the one from Monty Python's "Trouble at Mill" sketch: One on't cross beams gone owt askew on treadle. This nonsense may have been written so on the script as a joke, but what Graham Chapman could have said correctly in dialect is, "One o't crossbeams 'as gone out o' skew on't treadle", meaning "One of the crossbeams has gone askew on the treadle". The treadle was a rocking pedal, powered by the worker's foot. The treadle in turn powered a reciprocating beam, and the power from that was transferred to the machinery. On a loom, these reciprocating beams were called lams, and were connected with the treadles by strings which were also connected with jacks to work the yelds. In big factories, power could be transferred from one large drive wheel to another across a wide room via a reciprocating beam, called in that situation a crossbeam. (Note: I.e. not a joist (the normal meaning of "crossbeam")) Out of skew is a dialect expression meaning in incorrect position. Whether a foot-driven treadle could power a mighty crossbeam is a moot point, and may be a joke in itself, but the explanation of the above phrase and its humour is tightly connected with the mechanism of the weaving machinery described below.

==== Domestic looms ====
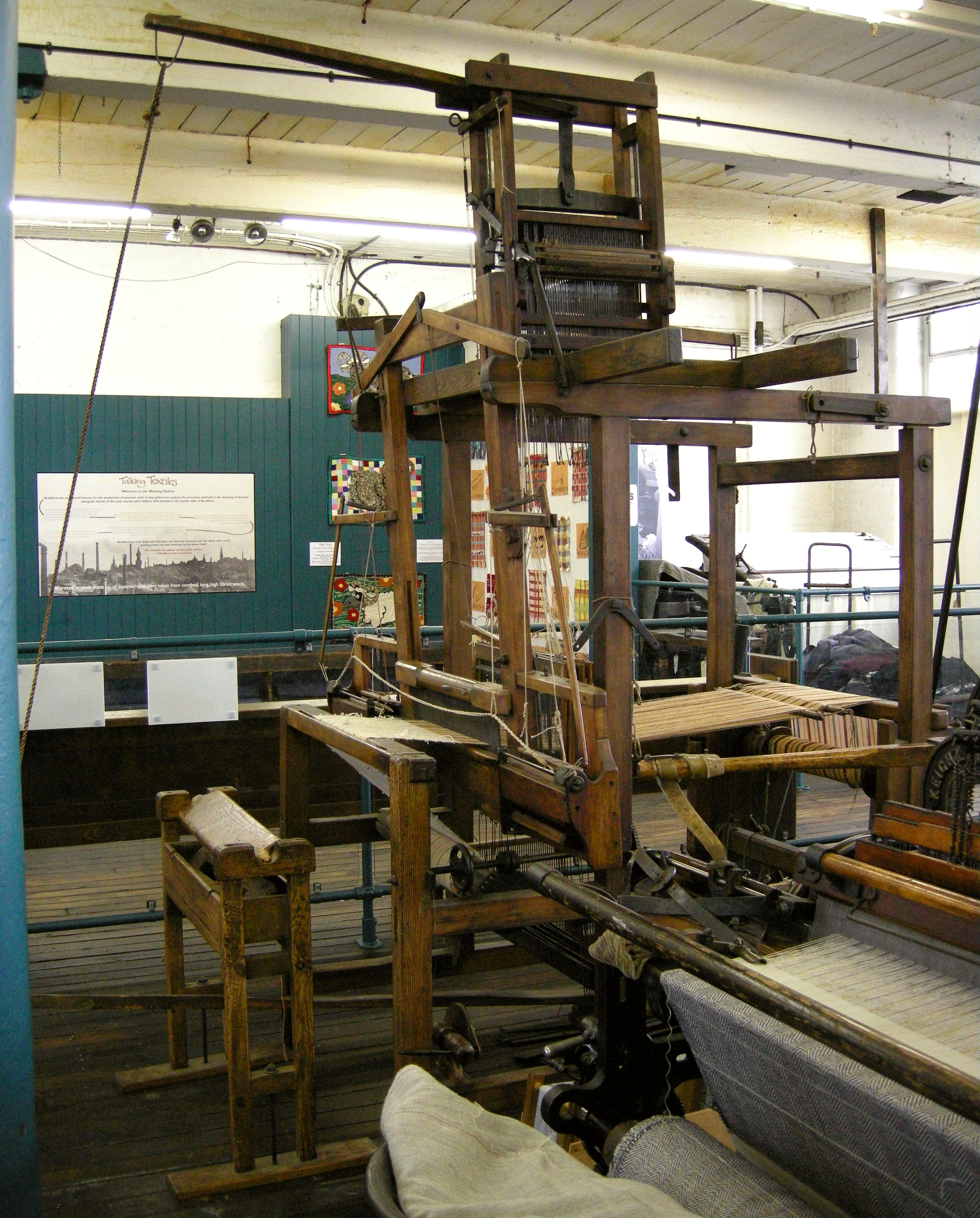
Hand loom with witch

The hand loom with the witch is typical of many that were used in the mills by cloth designers to develop new fabric designs and patterns. They are still used in the textile departments of universities and colleges for training students in weaving and the designing of fabrics. The shafts are lifted by a witch, an early form of dobby, with weights underneath to pull the shafts down, and can work up to 50 shafts to produce very complicated patterns. The weft is put in by hand using the flying shuttle method invented in 1733 by John Kay, and up to four colours can be woven in the weft using Robert Kay's (son of John Kay) 1760 invention of the multiple shuttle box. On this simple-to-operate loom, the designer is able to explore the application of new design ideas before beginning production trials on a wider loom. Many of the designs for woven fabrics made today were developed and created long ago on similar narrow-width pattern looms.

The handloom with jacquard is a wooden hand loom typical of the many thousands of looms that were used in the domestic cottage industry throughout the British Isles. They were gradually replaced by all-metal looms (see the Hattersley domestic loom) and new methods of working practice, such as the factory system, during the Industrial Revolution. The loom has a four-shuttle drop box to weave up to four colours of weft and has John Kay's flying shuttle method of inserting the weft. Most of the handlooms used in the home were ordinary shaft looms. These do not require roof space and would be weaving standard cloths, unlike this loom which is fitted with a 360 hook de Vogue jacquard and can weave very complex fabrics.

The plain Hattersley Domestic Loom was specially developed for cottage or home use and designed to replace the wooden handloom; the Domestic is similar in construction to a power loom. It was introduced in c.1900 and the makers claimed that a speed of 160 picks per minute could be easily attained with from 2 to 8 shafts weaving a variety of fabrics. Because foot pedals, or treadles, operate the loom it is still classed as a handloom, but it is much easier and faster to weave as all the motions of the loom are connected via crankshaft and gear wheels. Because the loom is designed to use only one shuttle when weaving, giving a solid colour in the weft, it is termed a plain loom. The cast metal chair, manufactured along with the loom, can be raised or lowered to suit, and the seat rocks forward and back as the weaver treadles the loom.

==== Power looms ====
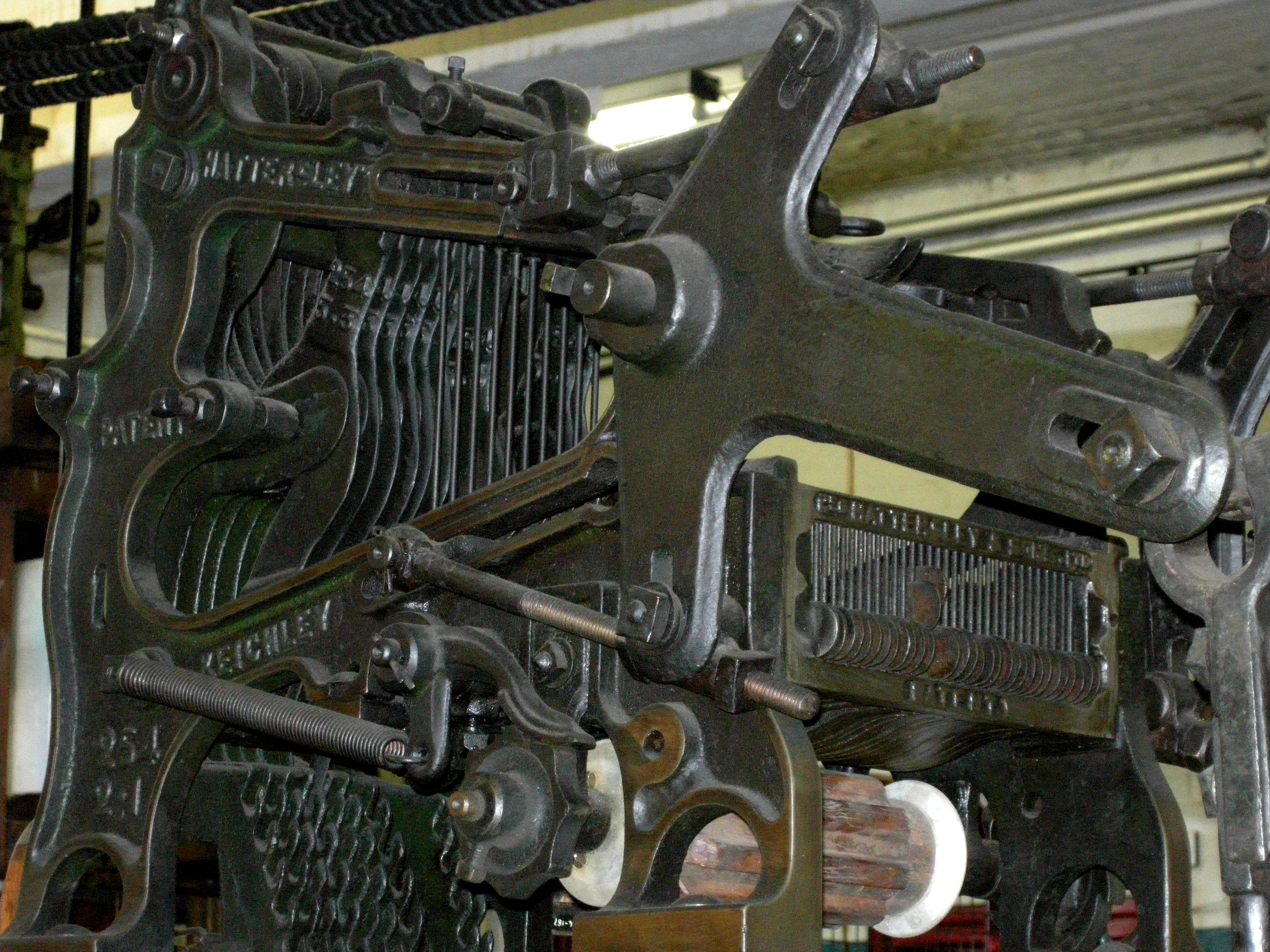
Hattersley 6 × 1 revolving skip box

The Hattersley 6 × 1 revolving skip box: this dress goods loom, used for the weaving of suiting fabrics, etc., is fitted with a negative V or angle dobby, a development of the original invented by Hattersley's in 1867. Known throughout the textile industry as the Keighley dobby, it has since been copied, modified, and manufactured in a variety of different forms. Hattersley also invented, in 1868, the skip box: a development of the circular or revolving box. This allowed the shuttle box to bypass or skip the next compartment along and pick out the shuttle of the following one.

The Dobcross H.K. box loom was manufactured in c.1950 by Hutchinson, Hollingworth & Co. Ltd of Dobcross, Oldham. This loom was claimed by its makers to be one of the most widely used power looms in the woollen and worsted industries. It was used, with minor adaptations, for weaving goods as varied as light tropical suiting, costume cloths, overcoatings, army and police uniform cloths, and heavy blankets. The main feature of this loom is the dobby (located top right of the loom with the hand wheel) which is known as the Knowles, American, or positive wheel dobby. This device lifts and lowers the wooden shafts through which the warp ends are threaded, separating the warp threads to produce the shed. The loom has four rising or drop boxes at each side, which can be moved independently and can weave up to seven shuttles, each with a different colour.

The Sowden worsted coating loom: as in all mechanical devices, there is a drive to improve efficiency, and this loom has several patent innovations. For example, the 28-shaft negative square dobby is similar in construction to Hattersley's Keighley dobby. However, to allow the shuttle more time to pass through the shed the dobby has special curved slots that allow the shafts to dwell or remain open for longer. In addition, the pattern chain or lags controlling the shafts can be set to control all 28 shafts, or set to operate the first sixteen shafts to weave the cloth and the remaining twelve shafts to produce a name list or selvedge. The word "selvedge" is derived from self-edge, the edge of the cloth where the weft is turned back as it returns through the shed. The selvedge would often have a brand name or the country of origin woven into it. On the left side of the loom is the patent four-shuttle drop box motion incorporating a foot pedal. This is part of an escape mechanism in case the shuttle becomes trapped.

== Outside ==
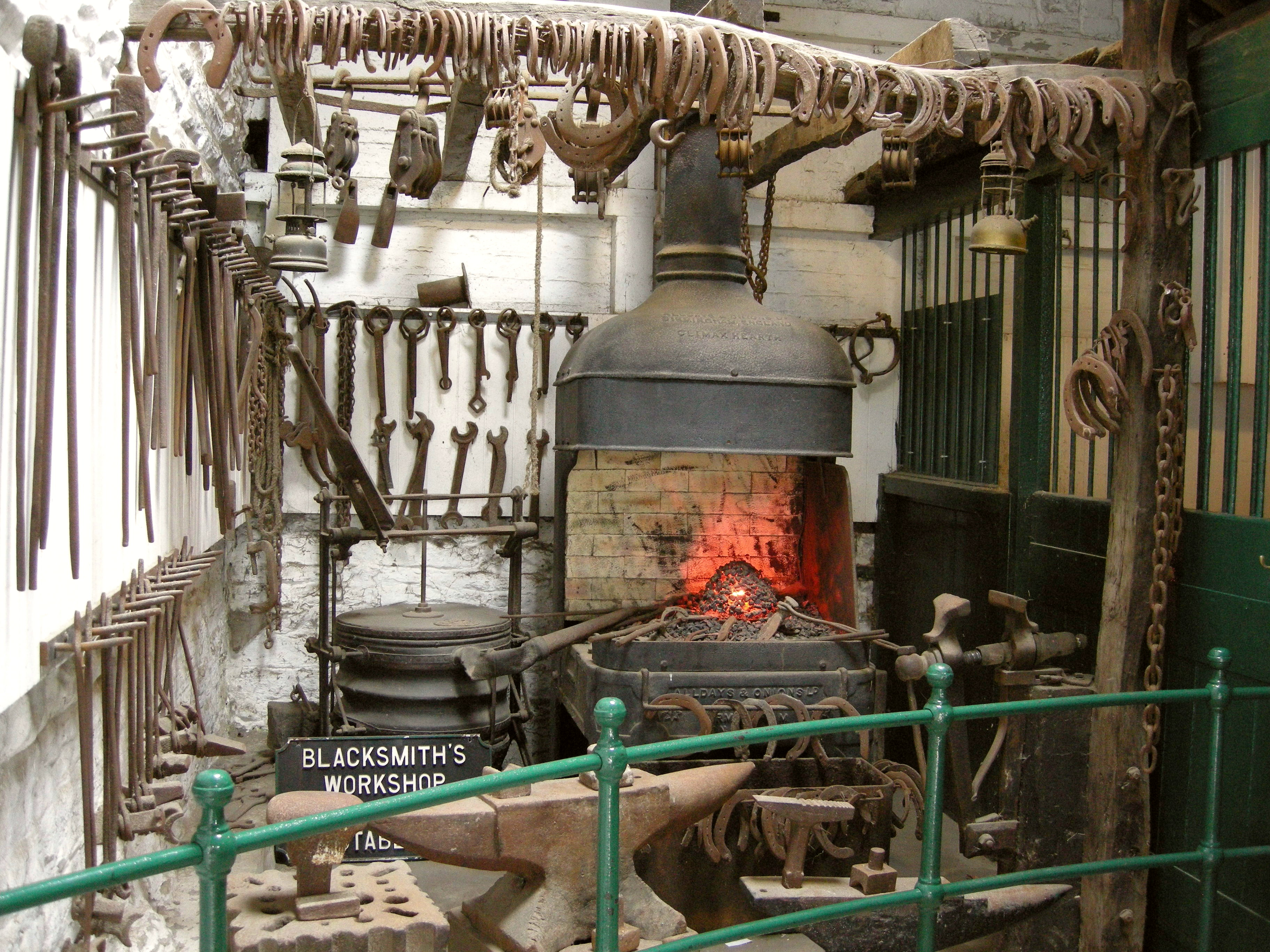
Blacksmith's workshop display

The mill's first owner, John Moore, lived at Moorside House with his family until 1887, followed by the later owners of Moorside Mills. The house interior is now a museum display, furnished as if the 19th century mill-owners were still living there. Gaythorne Row is a row of Victorian back-to-backs. It was rebuilt here in 1986 and is now furnished as for mill workers of the 1870s, 1940s, and 1970s.

The mill's former canteen block is now a Horse Emporium, where displays are arranged on the theme of horse power. Among other exhibits there is a heavy-duty British Railways dray, a decorative chaff cutter, and a horse fodder measure. There is a saddler-at-work display, plus horse brasses, horseshoes, and other harness. In a stable there is a blacksmith's workshop and farriery display, complete with many horseshoes, anvils, and metalworking tools.

=== Stables ===
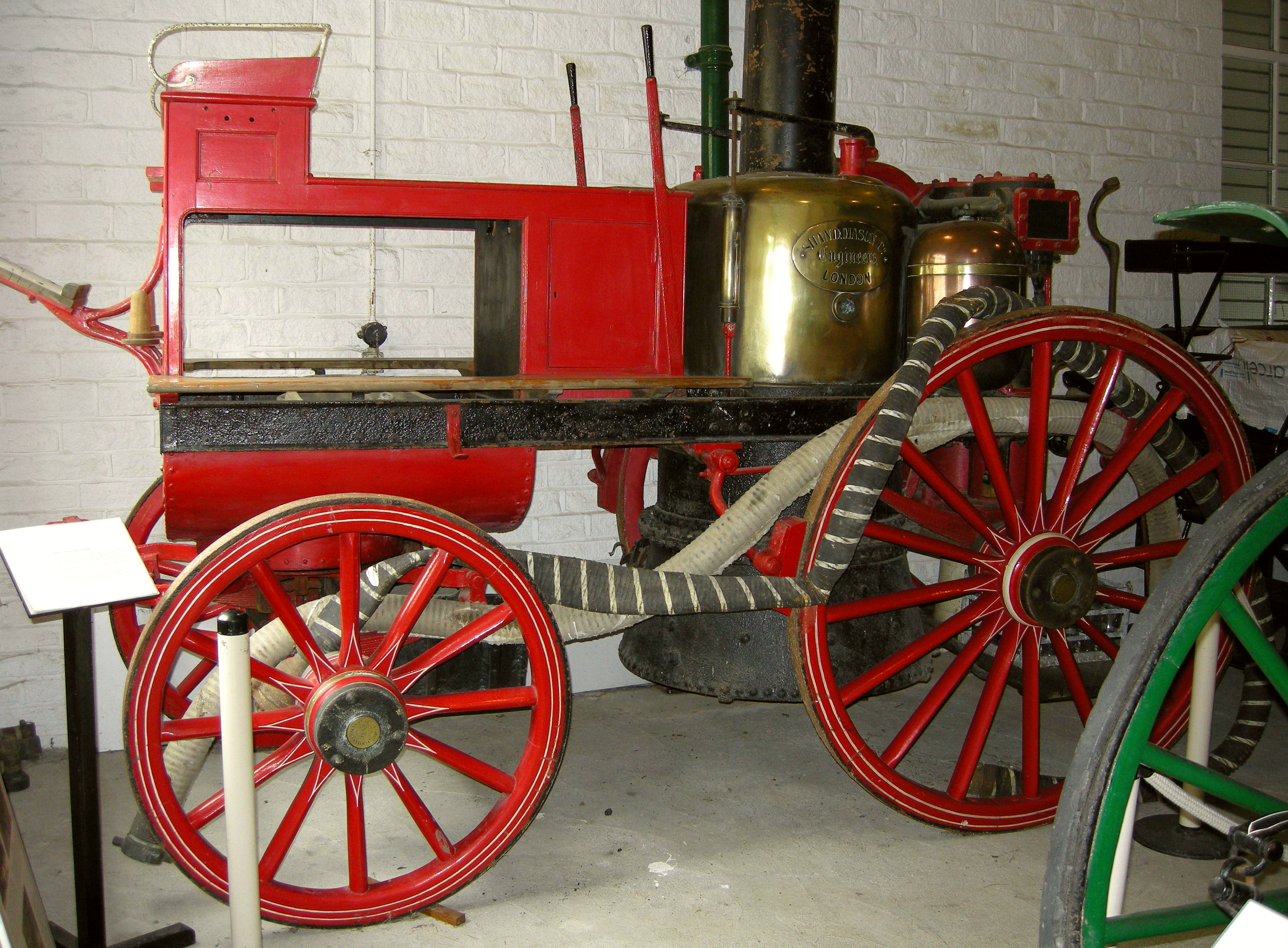
Shand-mason steam fire pump

This building was a 1918 motor car garage. The museum kept dray horses in the stables until 2011. At one end it contains restored horse-drawn vehicles. There is a reproduction of an 1890 garden seat omnibus, with wooden, slatted seats on top, like garden seats. These vehicles have not been used in the UK since 1931. This reproduction has hydraulic disc brakes for safety. There is a brougham, a 19th-century gentleman's light one-horse carriage. This design is said to have been named after Lord Chancellor Brougham in the early 19th century. There is also a steamer, or Shand Mason steam fire pump of c.1880. A team of horses pulled it, and steam powered it, at 250 gallons per minute. Firemen could get it ready in 7 minutes. It was successful enough for the manufacturers to export it worldwide – for example to the Warsaw Fire Guard – but it was expensive in coal and horses, and was superseded by motor pumps in c.1900.

== Temporary exhibitions and events ==
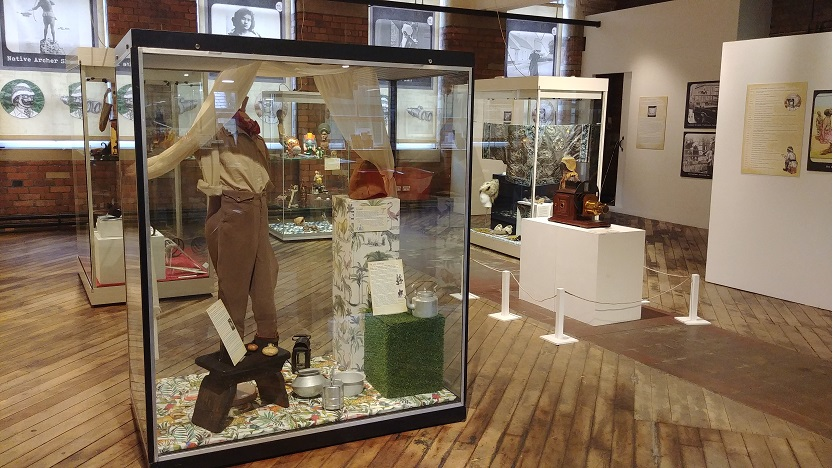
Temporary Exhibition Space

There are living history events, family activity days, and a yearly Victorian-style Christmas craft market. There are regular temporary exhibitions; in 2003, for example, there was a motorcycle exhibition, and in 2009 there was a rag-rug display. There are educational workshops for school and other groups, including Victorian classroom, World War II classroom and washday sessions.

In 1973 the museum held the first solo exhibition of the work of Edna Lumb, noted for her depiction of industrial life, especially equipment such as engines, pylons, quarries, and wheels. A retrospective of her work was held in 1991, shortly before her death.

From 7 December 2013 to 16 November 2014, the museum held an exhibition titled "A Masonic Experience". Organised Freemasonry began with the formation of the Grand Lodge of England in 1717 and a social fraternity grew out of operative Masonic guilds. This community exhibition will include a replica of a Masonic Lodge, a funnel fragment from a Falklands warship, and a colourful display of Masonic aprons, banners, glassware, and ceramics.

One of the exhibition's centrepieces was a sumptuous robe worn by Sarastro in The Royal Opera House London's production of Mozart's The Magic Flute. Mozart became a Freemason in 1784 and several of his works, including The Magic Flute, are believed to have Masonic aspects.

As of March 2025 the museum exhibited artefacts from Fountains Café, a business which was established in 1968 and had existed in the Oastler Centre for 55 years, but closed in 2023. The exhibition included original retro furniture, signage and artwork, which were "painstakingly cleaned and restored" as nostalgia items. The café was used as a backdrop in the TV series The Great Train Robbery (2013) with Jim Broadbent, and in scenes in Funny Cow (2017), featuring actors Alun Armstrong and Maxine Peake.

== See also ==
- Bradford District Museums & Galleries
