= ISO 2 =

ISO standard

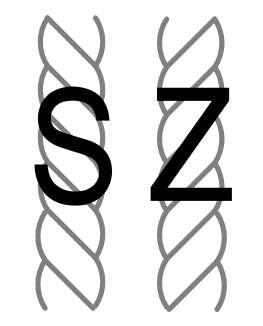
S-twist and Z-twist

ISO 2 is an international standard for direction of twist designation for yarns, complex yarns, slivers, slubbings, rovings, cordage, and related products.

The standard uses capital letters S and Z to indicate the direction of twist, as suggested by the direction of slant of the central portions of these two letters. The handedness of the twist is the direction of the twists as they progress away from an observer. Thus Z-twist is said to be right-handed, and S-twist to be left-handed. The convention of using these two letters to unambiguously designate twist direction was already used in the cordage industry by 1957.

Preceded by ISO 1	Lists of ISOs; ISO 2	Succeeded by ISO 3
