= Metre =

SI unit of length

metre
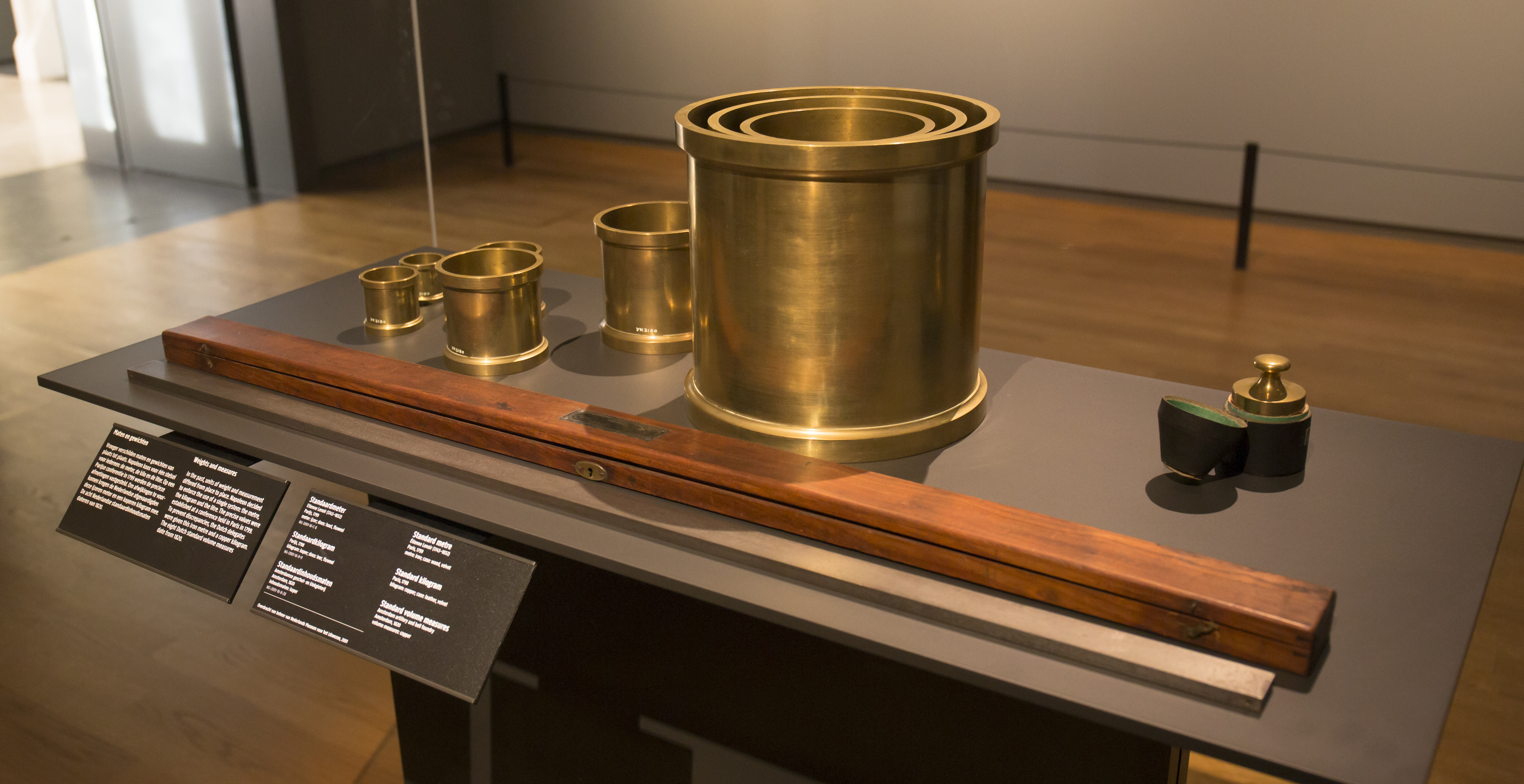
- Replicas of historical metric standards, including a copy of the Mètre des Archives

General information
- Unit system: SI
- Unit of: length
- Symbol: m

Conversions
1 m in ...	... is equal to ...
- Imperial/US units: ≈ 1.0936 yd; ≈ 3.2808 ft; ≈ 39.37 in
- Nautical units: ≈ 0.00053996 nmi

The metre (or meter in US spelling; symbol: m) is the base unit of length in the International System of Units (SI). Since 2019, the metre has been defined as the length of the path travelled by light in vacuum during a time interval of 1/299792458 of a second, where the second is defined by a hyperfine transition frequency of caesium.

The metre was originally proposed to be the length of a seconds pendulum (the length at which a pendulum will swing once every second), but this length was discovered to depend on local gravity. In 1791 the French National Assembly declared the metre would be one ten-millionth of the distance from the equator to the North Pole along a great circle through Paris, setting 10000 km as that quarter of the Earth's polar circumference.

In 1799, the metre was redefined in terms of a prototype metre bar. The bar used was changed in 1889, and in 1960 the metre was redefined in terms of a certain number of wavelengths of a certain emission line of krypton-86. The current definition was adopted in 1983 and modified slightly in 2002 to clarify that the metre is a measure of proper length. From 1983 until 2019, the metre was formally defined as the length of the path travelled by light in vacuum in 1/299792458 of a second. After the 2019 revision of the SI, this definition was rephrased to include the definition of a second in terms of the caesium frequency Δν_{Cs}.

== Etymology and spelling ==
The etymological roots of metre can be traced to the Greek verb μετρέω (metreo) ([I] measure, count or compare) and noun μέτρον (metron) (a measure), which were used for physical measurement, for poetic metre and by extension for moderation or avoiding extremism (as in "be measured in your response"). This range of uses is also found in Latin (metior, mensura), French (mètre, mesure), English (meter for measuring instruments, but metre or meter in poetry) and other languages. The Greek word is derived from the Proto-Indo-European root *meh₁- 'to measure'.

Metre is the standard spelling of the metric unit for length in all English-speaking nations except the United States and the Philippines, which use meter. In English, the use of the word metre (for the French unit mètre) began at least as early as 1790.

== History of definition ==
During the French Revolution, the traditional units of measure were to be replaced by consistent measures based on natural phenomena. As a base unit of length, scientists had favoured the seconds pendulum (a pendulum with a half-period of one second) one century earlier, but this was rejected as it had been discovered that this length varied from place to place with local gravity. The mètre was introduced, defined as one ten-millionth of the shortest distance from the North Pole to the equator passing through Paris, assuming an Earth flattening of 1/334.

Following the arc measurement of Delambre and Méchain, the historical French official standard of the metre was made available in the form of the Mètre des Archives, a platinum bar held in Paris. It was originally also planned to dematerialise the definition of the metre by counting the number of swings of a one-metre-long pendulum during a day at a latitude of 45°. However, dematerialising the definition of units of length by means of the pendulum would prove less reliable than artefacts.

During the mid-19th century, following the American Revolution and the decolonisation of the Americas, the metre gained adoption in the Americas, particularly in scientific usage, and it was officially established as an international measurement unit by the Metre Convention of 1875 at the beginning of the Second Industrial Revolution.

The Mètre des Archives and its copies such as the Committee Meter were replaced from 1889 by a new standard metre made of platinum-iridium, and 29 bars calibrated against it were distributed to different nations. This improved standardisation involved the development of specialised measuring equipment and the definition of a reproducible temperature scale.

Progress in science finally allowed the definition of the metre to be dematerialised; thus in 1960 a new definition based on a specific number of wavelengths of light from a specific transition in krypton-86 allowed the standard to be universally available by measurement. In 1983 this was updated to a length defined in terms of the speed of light; this definition was reworded in 2019:

The metre, symbol m, is the SI unit of length. It is defined by taking the fixed numerical value of the speed of light in vacuum c to be 299792458 when expressed in the unit m⋅s^{−1}, where the second is defined in terms of the caesium frequency Δν_{Cs}.

Where older traditional length measures are still used, they are now defined in terms of the metre – for example the yard has since 1959 officially been defined as exactly 0.9144 metre.

== SI prefixed forms of metre ==
SI prefixes can be used to denote decimal multiples and submultiples of the metre, as shown in the table below. Long distances are usually expressed in km, astronomical units (149,597,871 km), light-years (63,000 au; 9.5 trillion km), or parsecs (210,000 au; 31 trillion km), rather than in Mm or larger multiples. "30 cm", "30 m", and "300 m" are more common than "3 dm", "3 dam", and "3 hm", respectively.

The terms micron and millimicron have been used instead of micrometre (μm) and nanometre (nm), respectively, but this practice is discouraged.

SI multiples of metre (m)
Submultiples			Multiples		
Value	SI symbol	Name	Value	SI symbol	Name
10^{−1} m	dm	decimetre	10^{1} m	dam	decametre
10^{−2} m	cm	centimetre	10^{2} m	hm	hectometre
10^{−3} m	mm	millimetre	10^{3} m	km	kilometre
10^{−6} m	μm	micrometre	10^{6} m	Mm	megametre
10^{−9} m	nm	nanometre	10^{9} m	Gm	gigametre
10^{−12} m	pm	picometre	10^{12} m	Tm	terametre
10^{−15} m	fm	femtometre	10^{15} m	Pm	petametre
10^{−18} m	am	attometre	10^{18} m	Em	exametre
10^{−21} m	zm	zeptometre	10^{21} m	Zm	zettametre
10^{−24} m	ym	yoctometre	10^{24} m	Ym	yottametre
10^{−27} m	rm	rontometre	10^{27} m	Rm	ronnametre
10^{−30} m	qm	quectometre	10^{30} m	Qm	quettametre

== Equivalents in other units ==
Metric unit expressed in non-SI units				Non-SI unit expressed in metric units			
1 metre	≈	1.0936	yard	1 yard	=	0.9144	metre
1 metre	≈	39.370	inches	1 inch	=	0.0254	metre
1 centimetre	≈	0.39370	inch	1 inch	=	2.54	centimetres
1 millimetre	≈	0.039370	inch	1 inch	=	25.4	millimetres
1 metre	=	10^{10}	ångström	1 ångström	=	10^{−10}	metre
1 nanometre	=	10	ångström	1 ångström	=	100	picometres

Within this table, "inch" and "yard" mean "international inch" and "international yard" respectively, though approximate conversions in the left column hold for both international and survey units.

"≈" means "is approximately equal to";
"=" means "is exactly equal to".

One metre is exactly equivalent to (5 000)/127 inches and to (1 250)/(1 143) yards.

A simple mnemonic to assist with conversion is "three 3s": 1 metre is nearly equivalent to 3 feet 3 3/8 inches. This gives an overestimate of 0.125 mm.

The ancient Egyptian cubit was about 0.5 m (surviving rods are 523–529 mm). Scottish and English definitions of the ell (2 cubits) were 941 mm (0.941 m) and 1143 mm (1.143 m) respectively. The ancient Parisian toise (fathom) was slightly shorter than 2 m and was standardised at exactly 2 m in the mesures usuelles system, such that 1 m was exactly 1/2 toise. The Russian verst was 1.0668 km. The Swedish mil was 10.688 km, but was changed to 10 km when Sweden converted to metric units.

== See also ==
- ISO 1 – standard reference temperature for length measurements
- Metric prefix
- Metrication
