= ISO 1 =

ISO standard temperature, 20°C

ISO 1 is an international standard set by the International Organization for Standardization that specifies the standard reference temperature for geometrical product specification and verification. The temperature is fixed at 20 degrees Celsius (°C), which exactly equals both 293.15 kelvin (K) and 68 degrees Fahrenheit (°F).

Due to thermal expansion, precision length measurements need to be made at (or converted to) a defined temperature. ISO 1 helps in comparing measurements by defining such a reference temperature. The reference temperature of 20 °C was adopted by the International Committee for Weights and Measures on 15 April 1931, and this temperature was used in ISO recommendation number 1 in 1951. It soon replaced worldwide other reference temperatures for length measurements that manufacturers of precision equipment had used, including 0 °C, 62 °F, and 25 °C. Among the reasons for choosing 20 °C was that this was a comfortable and practical workshop temperature and that it resulted in an integer value on both the Celsius and Fahrenheit scales.

It was the first ISO standard, issued originally as ISO/R 1, an ISO Recommendation.

== See also ==
- Metre
- International Organization for Standardization

Preceded by —	Lists of ISOs; ISO 1	Succeeded by ISO 2
