= Sliver (textiles) =

Bundle or web of fiber used to spin yarn

A sliver (/ˈslaɪvər/) is a long bundle of fibre that is generally used to spin yarn. A sliver is created by carding or combing the fibre, which is then drawn into long strips where the fibre is parallel. When sliver is drawn further and given a slight twist, it becomes roving.

Worsted textiles differ from woolen textiles in that, after carding, they are subjected to gilling, a process to make sure the sliver has a more uniform linear weight, and lubricants are added.

== See also ==
- ISO 2
