= Worsted =

Fabrics manufactured from worsted yarns

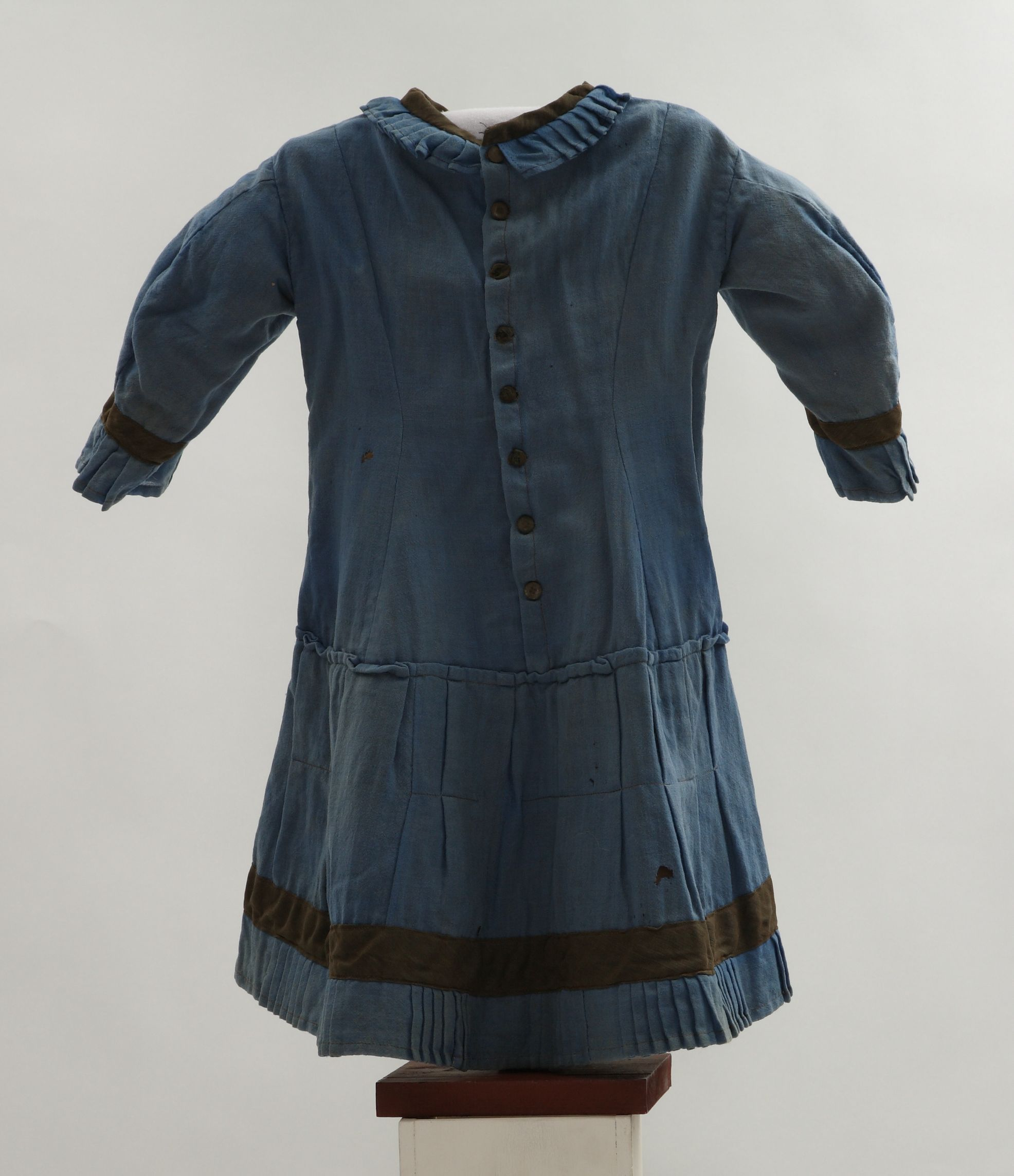
A blue worsted wool girl's dress from the United States, made in approximately 1878, from the collection of Conner Prairie

Worsted (/ˈwɜːrstɪd/ or /ˈwʊstɪd/) is a high-quality type of wool yarn, the fabric made from this yarn, and a yarn weight category. The name derives from Worstead (from Old English Wurðestede, "enclosure place"), a village in the English county of Norfolk. That village, together with North Walsham and Aylsham, formed a manufacturing centre for yarn and cloth in the 12th century, when pasture enclosure and liming rendered the East Anglian soil too rich for the older agrarian sheep breeds. In the same period, many weavers from the County of Flanders moved to Norfolk. "Worsted" yarns/fabrics are distinct from woollens (though both are made from sheep's wool): the former is considered stronger, finer, smoother, and harder than the latter.

Worsted was made from the long-staple pasture wool from sheep breeds such as Teeswaters, Old Leicester Longwool and Romney Marsh. Pasture wool was not carded; instead it was washed, gilled and combed (using heated long-tooth metal combs), oiled and finally spun. When woven, worsteds were scoured but not fulled.

Both worsted and woolen spun wool are used for knitted fabrics. Worsted wool fabric is typically used in the making of tailored garments such as suits. In tropical-weight worsteds, the use of tightly spun, straightened wool combined with a looser weave permits air to flow through the fabric. Worsted is also used for carpets, clothing, hosiery, gloves and baize.

== Manufacture ==
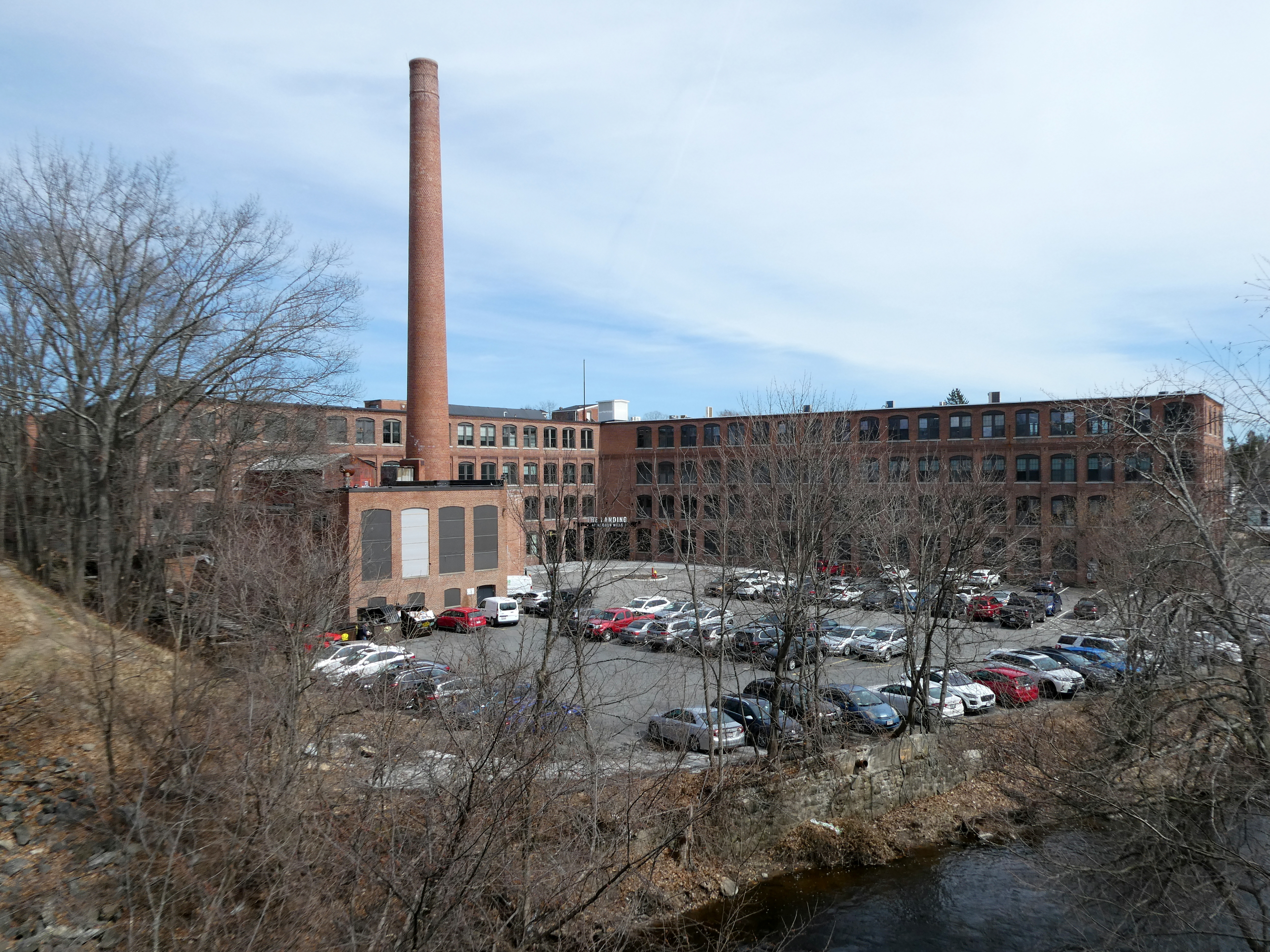
A former worsted mill in Hudson, Massachusetts

Worsted cloth, archaically also known as stuff, is lightweight and has a coarse texture. The weave is usually twill or plain. Twilled fabrics such as whipcord, gabardine and serge are often made from worsted yarn. Worsted fabric made from wool has a natural recovery, meaning that it is resilient and quickly returns to its natural shape, but non-glossy worsted will shine with use or abrasion.

=== Worsted and woollens ===
Though both made of wool, worsted and woollens undergo different manufacturing steps resulting in significantly different cloths. In worsteds, which undergo more spinning steps, the natural crimp of the wool fiber is removed in the process of spinning the yarn while it is retained in woolens, and woollens are produced with short-staple yarns while worsted cloths need longer staple length. When woven, the yarns in worsted cloth lie parallel. Woollen materials are soft and bulky with fuzzy surfaces, while worsted is smoother. There are different terms in use for describing the softness of textile materials. The wool trade term for it is handle, with good handling cloth being soft to the touch, while poor handling suggests the material's harsh hand feel.

== Technique and preparation ==
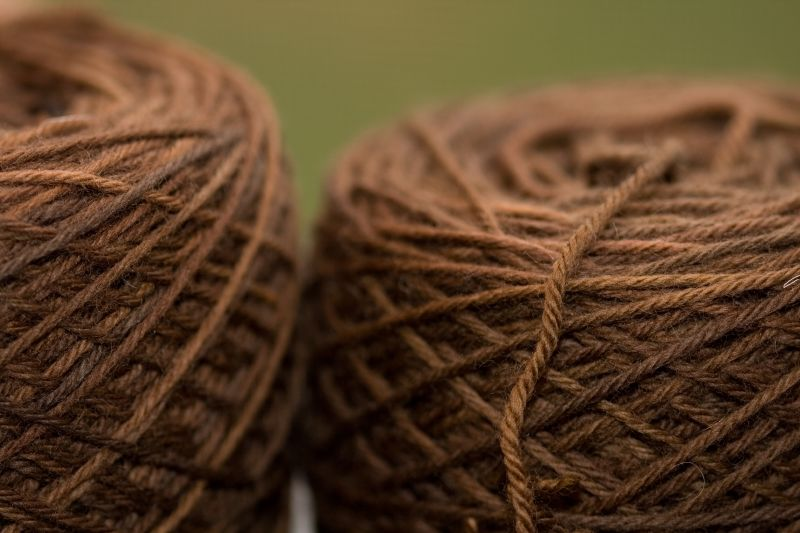
Worsted yarn made from Merino wool

The essential feature of worsted yarn is straight, parallel fibres. Originally, long, fine staple wool was spun to create worsted yarn; today, other long fibres are also used.

Many spinners differentiate between worsted preparation and worsted spinning. Worsted preparation refers to the way the fibre is prepared before spinning, using ginning machines which force the fibre staples to lie parallel to each other. Once these fibres have been made into a top, they are then combed to remove the short fibres. The long fibres are combined in subsequent gilling machines to again make the fibres parallel. This produces overlapping untwisted strands called slivers. Worsted spinning refers to using a worsted technique, which produces a smooth yarn in which the fibres lie parallel.

Roving and wool top are often used to spin worsted yarn. Many hand spinners buy their fibre in roving or top form. Top and roving are ropelike in appearance, in that they can be thick and long. While some mills put a slight twist in the rovings they make, it is not enough twist to be a yarn. The fibres in top and rovings all lie parallel to one another along the length, which makes top ideal for spinning worsted yarns.

Worsted-spun yarns, used to create worsted fabric, are spun from fibres that have been combed, to ensure that the fibres all run the same direction, butt-end (for wool, the end that was cut in shearing the sheep) to tip, and remain parallel. A short draw is used in spinning worsted fibres (as opposed to a long draw).

In short draw spinning, spun from combed roving, sliver or wool top, the spinners keep their hands very close to each other. The fibres are held fanned out in one hand while the other hand pulls a small number from the mass. The twist is kept between the second hand and the wheel—there is never any twist between the two hands.

== Weight ==
According to the Craft Yarn Council, the term "Worsted Weight", also "Afghan", "Aran", or simply "Medium", refers to a particular weight of yarn that produces a gauge of 16–20 stitches per 4 inches of stockinette, and is best knitted with 4.5mm to 5.5mm needles (US size 7–9).

The term worsted, in relation to textile yarn weight, is defined as the number of hanks of yarn, each with a length of 560 yards, that weigh one pound.

Super numbers represent the fineness of the worsted wool fiber used in the fabric. The higher the number, such as Super 100s, 120s, or 150s, the finer the wool thread is. The actual number is calculated by the maximum number of hanks of wool that can be spun into one pound of wool. For example, if you can spin 100 hanks each 560 yards long, the resulting wool is classified as Super 100s. Generally, the higher the super number, the lighter the weight of the fabric.

== Automation ==
Before the introduction of automatic machinery, there was little difficulty in attaining a straight fibre, as long wool was always used, and the sliver was made up by hand, using combs. The introduction of Richard Arkwright's water frame in 1771, and the later introduction of cap and mule spinning machines, required perfectly prepared slivers. Many manufactories used one or more preparatory combing machines (called gill-boxes) before further processing, to ensure straight fibres and to distribute the lubricant evenly.
