= Edna Lumb =

British artist

- at Covent Garden by Jennifer Beeston
- Born: 14 August 1931; Leeds, England
- Died: 28 April 1992 (aged 60)
- Occupations: artist and teacher
- Known for: realist paintings and prints of industrial landscapes and machinery
- Notable work: Horsforth Quarry, Yorkshire, 1962. Etching and aquatint; Tingley Gasworks, Leeds 1964. Oil on canvas.

Edna Lumb (1931–1992) was a British artist specialising in industrial technology depicted in oils and prints. She was based in her home town of Leeds, UK but travelled around the UK, Europe and West Africa for inspiration and subjects for her art.

== Early life and education ==
Edna Isobel Lumb was born in Leeds, UK, on 14 August 1931 and was the youngest of the six children in her family. She studied at Leeds College of Art from 1948 until 1953. In 1951, financed by a travelling scholarship, she went to France and Spain. What she saw had an influence on her subsequent work.

== Life and work ==
After being awarded her National Diploma in Design, she taught unenthusiastically in secondary schools until 1964 when she became a full-time artist. She travelled around the UK and Europe while living in a van. She also painted aid programmes in West Africa in 1969, 1976 and 1977. Her works were commissioned by companies including Laing Properties, Sir Alfred McAlpine and Company and organisations including the National Audit Office. In the late 1970s she was commissioned to produce on-site paintings during the conversion of the Covent Garden flower market building into London Transport Museum. In later life she lived in Bath and Blackheath, London.

Her subjects were British urban and industrial life and her depictions of industrial equipment were particularly appreciated by the scientific community. She showed technical details but brought out the beauty and drama. This pioneered depiction of industrial landscapes, especially in Northern England. She worked in several media, including paint, prints and etchings.

She died on 28 April 1992.

== Exhibitions ==
Her first solo exhibition (Components of Power) was in 1973 which started at the Bradford Industrial Museum and was then transferred to the Science Museum in London. A retrospective of her work was shown in Bradford in 1991, shortly before her death. This was again shown in the Science Museum in London in 1992. Her exhibition Aspects of Dockland was held at the Bluecoat Chambers, Liverpool in 1975. In 2016 her work was shown at the Vernon Street Gallery in Leeds.

== Edna Lumb Travel Prize ==
There is an annual Edna Lumb Travel Prize available to art students studying at Leeds Beckett University. Funding for the award originally came from Lumb's will.

== Collections ==
Her works are held by Leeds Art Gallery, London Transport Museum, the Science Museum in London, Manchester City Art Galleries and Bradford Museums and galleries. Her archives are kept at Leeds Museums and Galleries.

== In others' art ==
Logan's name is one of those featured on the sculpture Ribbons, unveiled in 2024.
