= Combing =

Method of preparing fiber for spinning

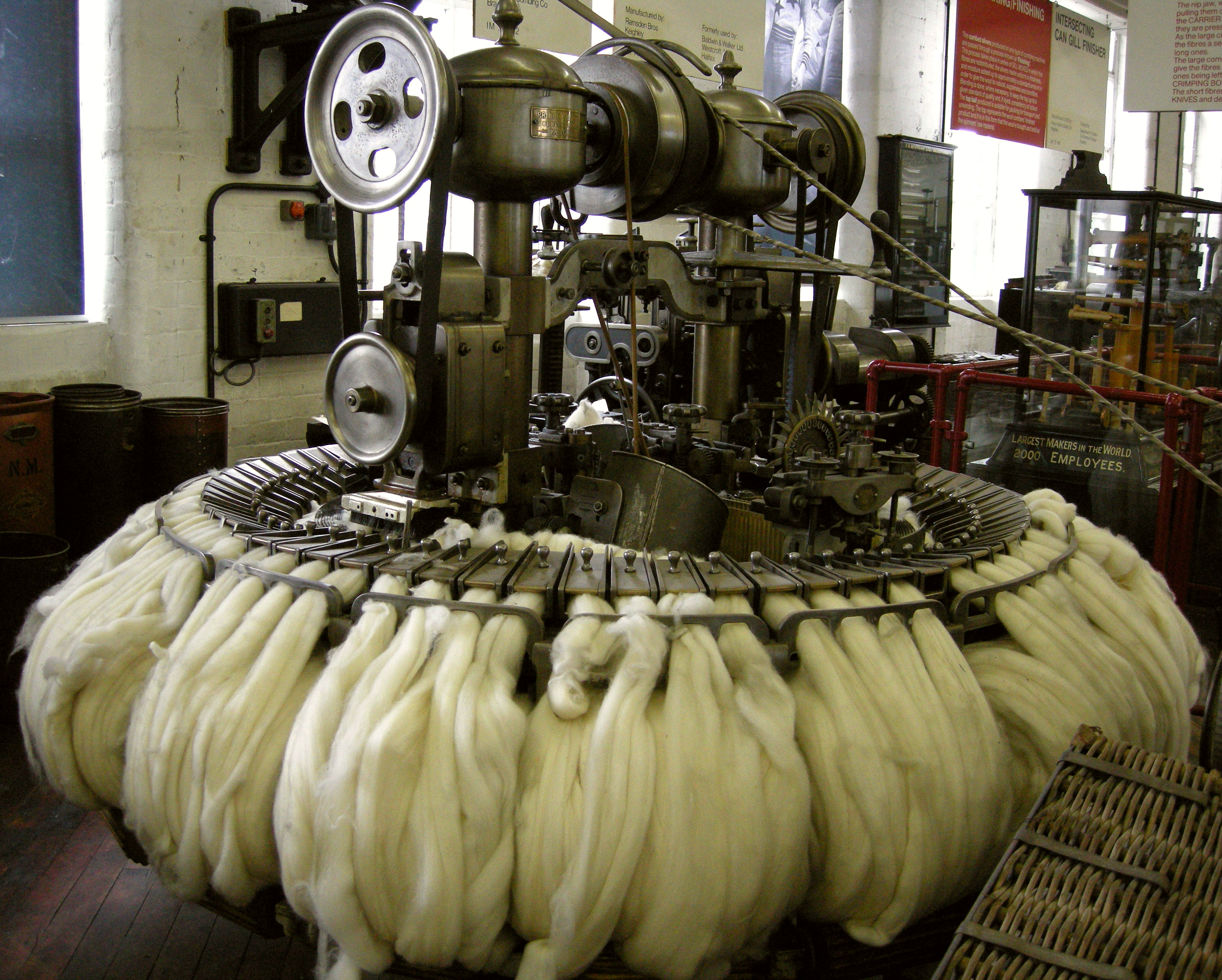
Noble comber in Bradford

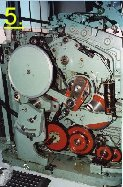
French comb PB31L for worsted system

Combing is a method for preparing carded fibre for spinning. Combing aligns fibers in parallel before spinning to produce a smoother, stronger, and more lustrous yarn. The process of combing is accompanied by gilling, a process of evening out carded or combed top making it suitable for spinning. Combing separates out short fibres by means of a rotating ring or rectilinear row of steel pins. The fibres in the 'top' it produces have been straightened and lie parallel to each other. When combing wool, the discarded short fibres are called noils, and are ground up into shoddy.

In general, there are two main systems of preparing fibre for yarn: the worsted system and the woollen system. The worsted system is defined by the removal of short fibres by combing and top preparation by gilling. In the woollen system, short fibres are retained, and it may or may not involve combing.

Combing is divided into linear and circular combing. The Noble comb is an example of circular combing. The French comb is an example of linear combing.

== Description ==
The circular combs used have long metal teeth, and only barely resemble the comb used on hair. However, they are used in a similar fashion with one comb holding the fibre, which is slowly dubbed in by a brush, while the other is moved through, slowly transferring the fibre to the moving comb.

The rectilinear comb uses a circular comb mounted on a drum to comb out the fringe and remove short fibre (set by a scale so fibres less than, for example, 25 mm are removed) not held by a clamping mechanism. The row of pins known as a top comb is a very fine tooth comb, for example, 25 teeth per inch; it is inserted in cylindrical combed fringe to act as an impediment to contaminates (burr, seed etc.) flow. The top comb acts as an impediment to contamination moving into a combed sliver. On a next circular combing short finer and contaminants are removed. The circular combing without short fibres is placed on a moving belt in an overlapping motion. The circular combing and top comb insertion are repeated and combed fibres—now called tuft are overlapped. The overlapping produces some cohesion allowing the tuft then to be twisted to form a combed sliver. This sliver is weak and unsuitable for spinning. To allow spinning to take place additional gilling is required to introduce fibre end irregularity (Sokolov 1994).

Combing the fibres removes the short fibres and arranges the fibre in a flat bundle, with all the fibres going the same direction. This preparation is commonly used to spin a worsted yarn. Woollen yarns cannot be spun from fibre prepared with combs, instead, the fibre must be carded. Cotton is combed when it is to be used for quality fabric with high thread counts.

In general, combing is done to filter or sieve out any short length fibres (for example, fibres shorter than 21 mm). Combing or carding is a primary process, followed by the gilling process, which removes hooks and involves three separate machines. Combing is then followed by two Gillings to remove irregularity in the sliver and randomize fibre ends. This post-combing process is required if spinning is to follow. It is known that a sliver can be spun to a yarn of only 21 fibres with a suitable average length of 150 mm.

Combing is a mechanical sieve, and so will not remove any contaminant with a form similar to the fibre being combed. Such contaminants must be mended out from a final garment. The manual mending out is a costly process.

There are two competing combing technologies: the Noble (1853) comb (variants Lister, Heilman (1846) and Holden) and the French comb. The Noble comb technology is inefficient, hence most combing in the world is carried out on the French system. The French system is superior as it combs the entire length of a fibre. Noble combs suffer from the problem that they will not comb 2 mm of a fibre's length. The 2 mm is the distance between counter-rotating pins. The French system is a rectilinear combing system as opposed to earlier woollen systems developed in England. Although the Heilman and Noble comb was an original circular design (also developed in min and 18–19th-century England) as it happens in modern history, English mills didn't share technology – resulting in the development of superior technology on continental Europe in the mid-19th century, as in France.

Efforts were made by Bradford to study the mechanism of noble combing but they failed to produce tangible results. The Noble and French combs are now well-understood technology thanks to work by CSIRO. After 1994, Sokolov has endeavoured to improve combing performance in the rectilinear comb. Combing technology continues to develop: Sokolov and Kirby developed a theory for combing model, simulation software for combing and drive design in 1982. Current technology used in providing comb drive by introducing innovation on cam performance to deliver textile fibre needs and separate mechanical performance of the comb was developed by Sokolov. The cam technology was an advance on century-old technology of cams by producing a subspecies of new cam design.

== Machinery ==
In cotton manufacture, the Heilmann comber was superseded by the Naismith comber. In the worsted process a Noble comber was a common make, but now a French comber is more common.

The Noble comb is no longer used in worsted system as the technology is inefficient. Noble combing may have been used for the woollen system or long fibres 250 mm or more. The predominant technology for all fibres is the French comb system. A cotton comber is scaled and simplified mechanically version of a rectilinear comb relative to a mean fibre length (similar to the Naismith comber). This scaled version of the wool comb can be seen in a stroke of the components used in a cotton comber. The scaled down comb has the purpose of accommodating fibre length and fibre physics requirements. The same scaled-up version of a comb can be seen in the way flax is combed.

== See also ==
- Carding
- Yarn realisation

== Bibliography ==
- Collier, Ann M (1970), A Handbook of Textiles, Pergamon Press, p. 258, ISBN 978-0-08-018057-1
- Dooley, William H. (1914), Textiles (Project Gutenberg ed.), Boston, USA: D.C. Heath and Co.
