= Wool top =

Scoured, combed and sorted raw wool, produced for hand spinning

Wool top is a semi-processed product from raw wool. The process, by hand or machine, prepares the wool for worsted spinning and generally the wool is scoured (washed) and combed and sorted. This results in parallel fibers that are smooth and long, with the shorter fibers and debris removed. Wool top can also be spun to semi-woolen or woolen yarn. Roving is another form of processing, which is used primarily for woolen spun yarn.

Topmills are mills that specialize in producing wool top. To be closer to customers, some of the industry has moved from Australia, Europe and the US to China. Many American and British companies produce high quality wool top from sheep wool and fiber; most work with the fleece from cleaning it to hand dying. A top maker is an old term for a person engaged in the process.
