= Roving =

Long, narrow bundle of fiber

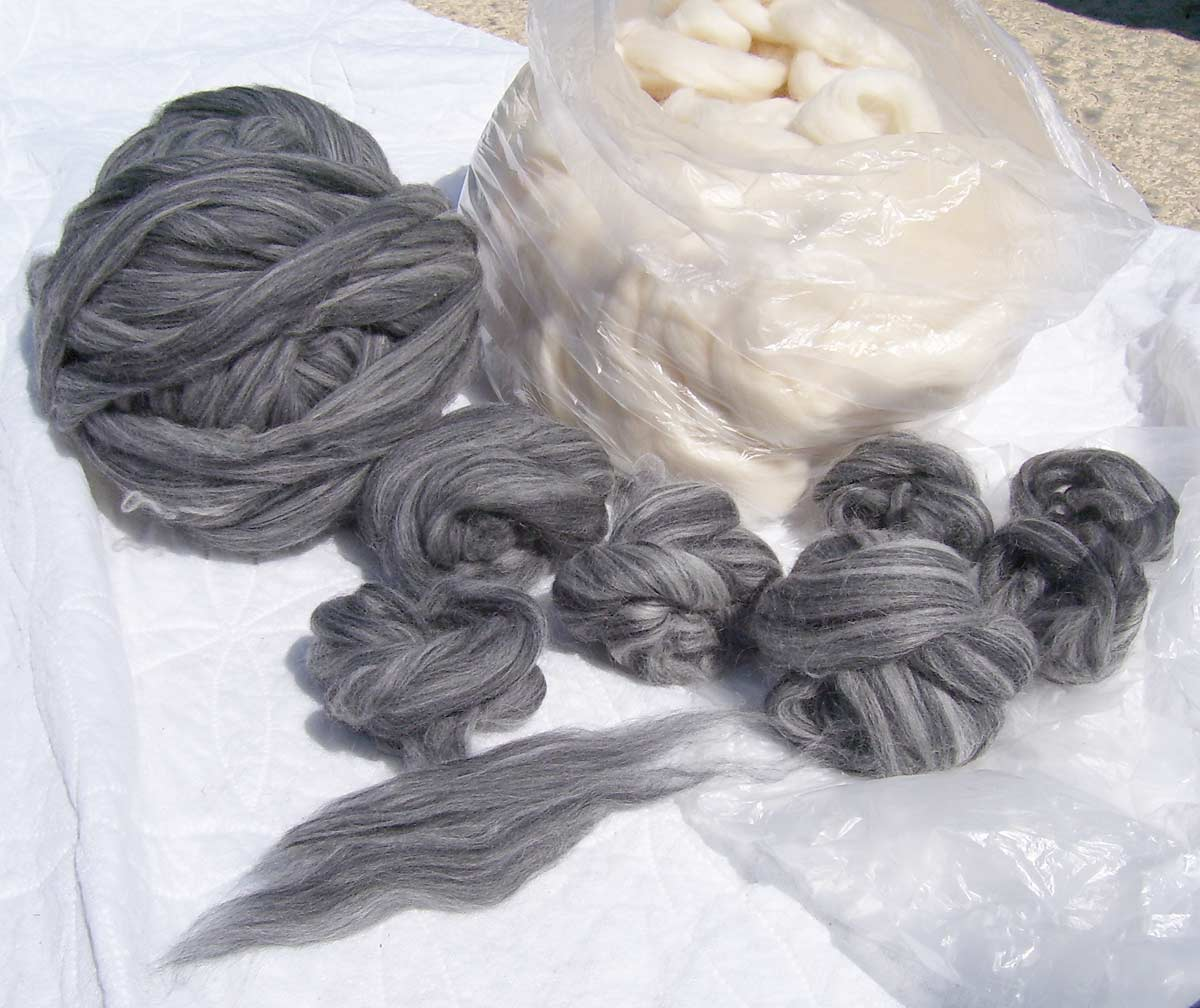
Grey and white wool roving

A roving is a long and narrow bundle of fiber. Rovings are produced during the process of making spun yarn from wool fleece, raw cotton, or other fibers. Their main use is as fiber prepared for spinning, but they may also be used for specialized kinds of knitting or other textile arts.

After carding, the fibers lie roughly parallel in smooth bundles. These are drawn out, by hand or machine, and slightly twisted to form lengths suitable for thread spinning. These unspun strands of fiber are the rovings. Roving can also mean a roll of these strands, the strands in general (as a mass noun), or the process of creating them.

Because it is carded, the fibers are less parallel than wool top (which is combed) and are not of uniform length. Carded rovings look fluffier than combed top, which looks smooth and has a high luster. The fibers in combed top tend to be fairly uniform in length because of the preparation method. Though drawing it into strips may line the fibers up a bit. Roving is not to be confused with sliver as there is twist in roving.

Pencil roving is a type of roving that has been drawn until it is the size of a fat pencil. It can be used by spinners with minimal drafting (withdrawing fibers from a clump). Knitters also use pencil roving, similar to Lopi style yarns, or when making a thrummed item. Regular roving can also be used in thrummed knitting.
