= Middleton and Smerrill =

Civil parish in Derbyshire, England

Coordinates: 53.158°N 1.729°W

- Civil parish
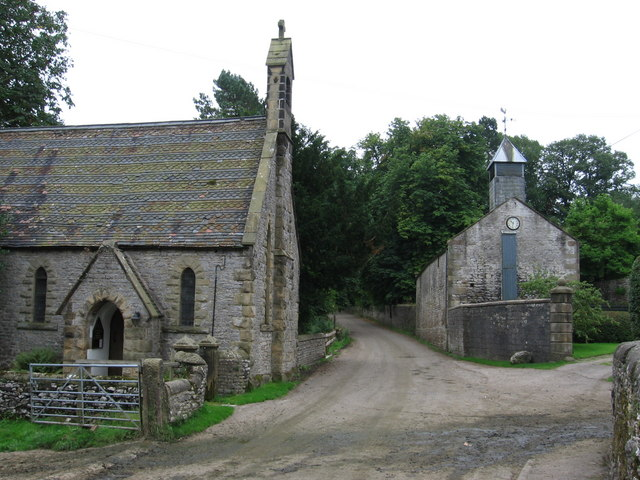
- Chapel of St Michael and All Angels in Middleton (left) and stable block

- Location within Derbyshire
- Interactive map of Middleton and Smerrill
- Area: 4.61 sq mi (11.9 km^{2}) (2021)
- Population: 133 (2021)
  - Density: 29/sq mi (11/km^{2})
- OS grid reference: SK 1862
  - London: 130 mi (210 km) SE
- District: Derbyshire Dales
- Shire county: Derbyshire
- Region: East Midlands
- Country: England
- Sovereign state: United Kingdom
- Settlements: Middleton-by-Youlgreave; Smerrill Grange
- Post town: BAKEWELL
- Postcode district: DE45
- Dialling code: 01629
- Police: Derbyshire
- Fire: Derbyshire
- Ambulance: East Midlands
- UK Parliament: Derbyshire Dales
- Website: www.middletonbyyoulgrave.org.uk

Middleton and Smerrill is a civil parish within the Derbyshire Dales district, in the county of Derbyshire, England. Largely rural except for the village of Middleton-by-Youlgreave and isolated farms, Middleton and Smerrill's population was reported as 133 residents in the 2021 census. It is 130 miles (210 km) north west of London, 20 miles (32 km) north west of the county city of Derby, and 4 1/2 miles (7.2 km) south west of the nearest market town of Bakewell. Middleton and Smerrill is wholly within the Peak District national park, in the southern part of the area. It is one of the largest parishes but among the smallest by way of residents, and shares a border with the parishes of Gratton, Hartington Middle Quarter, Hartington Nether Quarter, Hartington Town Quarter, Monyash and Youlgreave. There are 31 listed structures in Middleton and Smerrill.

== Geography ==
=== Location ===
Middleton and Smerrill is surrounded by the following local places:

- Monyash and Over Haddon to the north
- Friden, Newhaven and Pikehall to the south
- Dale End, Elton and Youlgreave to the east
- Hartington, Heathcote and Parsley Hay to the west.

The parish is roughly bounded by land features such as the Long Rake road and disused Long Rake mine to the north, an old Roman road route is to the west, River Bradford and Rowlow Brook in the east, while Smerrill Moor lies to the south. This area lies in the centre west of the Derbyshire Dales district and Derbyshire county.

Middleton and Smerrill is completely within the Peak District National Park in its southern area.

==== Settlements and routes ====
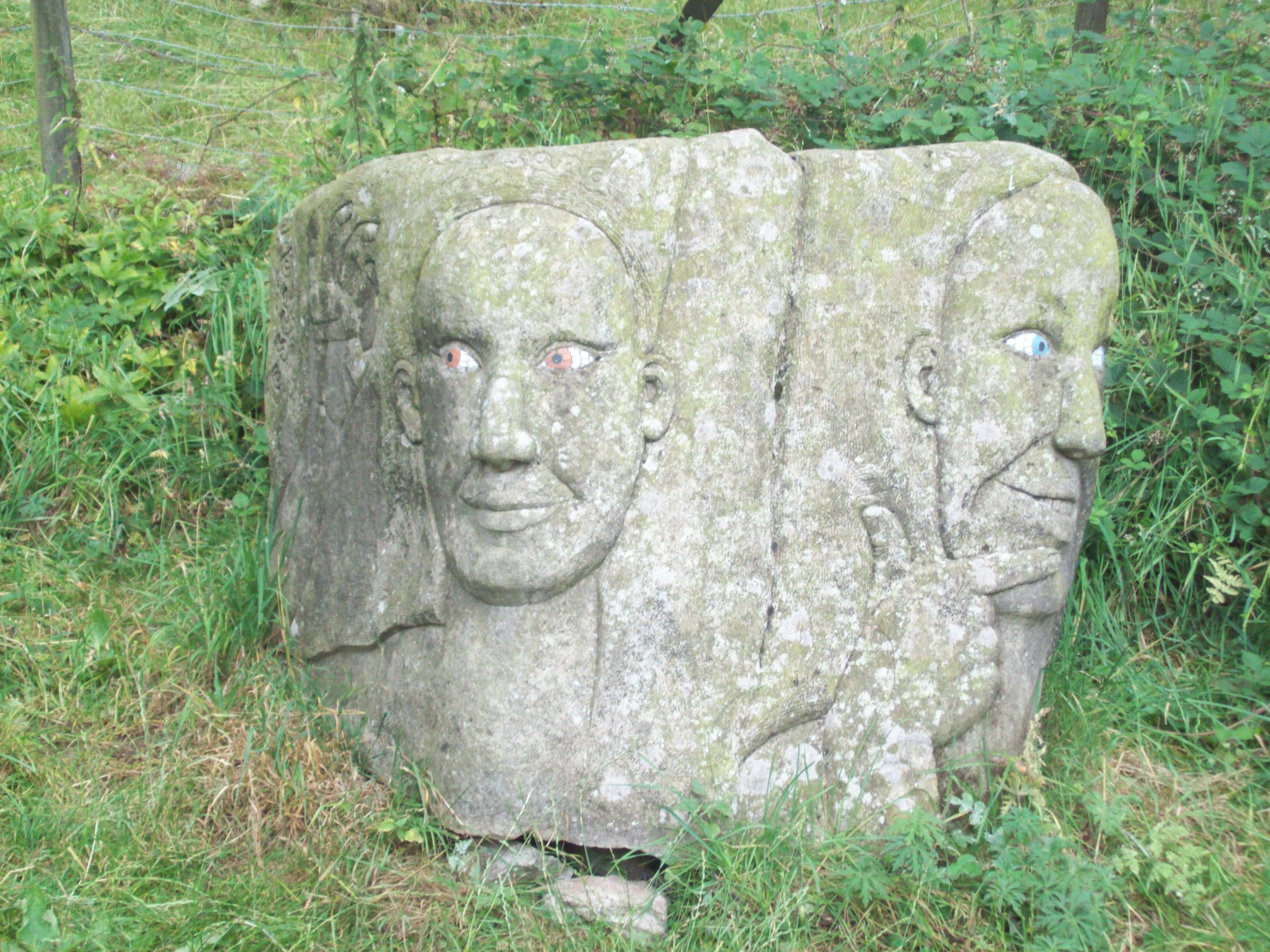
One of the marker stones situated at the entrances to Middleton and Smerrill parish

The parish is named for two locations within the parish:

- Middleton is a village, also known as Middleton-by-Youlgreave, and is to the north east of the area;
- Smerrill Grange in the east, comprising a cluster of farms.

Outside of these settlements, the parish is predominantly an agricultural and rural area.

The key routes throughout the parish include:

- Weaddow Lane from Youlgreave through Middleton and Smerrill villages, and onto Dale End and Elton;
- Long Rake which forms a portion of the north parish boundary and is split off towards Middleton;
- Corbsbury Road from Newhaven in the south eventually meeting Long Rake.

=== Environment ===
==== Landscape and geology ====
Primarily farming and pasture land throughout the parish outside the sparsely populated areas, there is little forestry throughout, mainly around Smerrill Moor, Rowlow brook, Rake and Kenslow woods.

Middleton Common is the open land to the west of the parish, while Smerrill Moor is in the far south of the area.

There are several large farms in and around Middleton, based mainly around sheep and dairy farming, as the wider area has limestone rock outcrops in almost every field and has no depth of soil for any substantial arable farming.

The ground is a mix of limestone, lead, ganister/sandstone, barytes, some umber and others including copper. Unique varieties of barytes and copper have been found in the parish.

==== Water features ====
There are the River Bradford and Rowlow brook which form the eastern boundary of the parish. Small ponds formed by former mining activities exist throughout.

==== Land elevation ====
The parish rises from the River Bradford towards the west, the lowest point are around its valley at ~160–170 metres (520–560 ft), the area around Middleton village is in the range of 210–250 metres (690–820 ft), Smerrill Grange is around 225 metres (738 ft), with the parish peak in the western portion of the parish close to Arbor Low at 375 metres (1,230 ft).

== History ==
=== Toponymy ===
Middleton was recorded in the Domesday survey as Middeltune which stood for 'middle farm'.

Smerrill was a 'hill with good pasturage' but only appearing in public record since the 13th century as Smereshill. it later had the term grange appended due to ownership by monks from a monastery.

=== Local area ===
==== Middleton and environs ====
The parish is rich in artefacts, including flint fragments and tumuli, dating human occupation to between the early Neolithic to late Bronze Ages (4000 BC to 701 BC). Arbor Low to the north west of the area is a henge which was in use around the late Neolithic period (2800-2000 BC). A Roman road was laid along the now south west parish boundary during the time of their occupation (43AD to 409AD). By the time prior to Norman Conquest in 1066 the area was held by Ylving, and after the Domesday survey of 1086 by Henry de Ferrers, having been granted the wider area by William the Conqueror. During late medieval times the abbot and monks of Leicester possessed a sizable tract of land immediately south west of Middleton and had a grange here to which a chapel was attached but little of this remains. In the 13th and 14th centuries Middleton was owned by the de Herthill dynasty and it passed from them to the Cockayne family by the marriage of the heiress of Richard de Harthill in the 15th century. A settlement was recorded in the south of the parish by Oldham Fam in around 1533. From Edward Cockayne Middleton was purchased by Francis Fulwood at the end of the 16th century, and sold to his brother Sir George Fulwood, who in 1602 built what became known as Middleton or Fulwood Castle, a fortified manor house. During the English Civil War his son, Sir Christopher Fulwood, a staunch royalist, organised around a thousand lead miners with plans to march to Derby and support Charles I when the castle was attacked by a force of Oliver Cromwell's soldiers in November 1643. Fulwood fled and hid in a cave near a large rock in Bradford Dale, now known locally as "Fulwood's Rock" – however he was found, shot and taken by Parliament troops to Lichfield where he later died of his injuries. The castle, damaged by the fighting eventually became derelict and the stones were used for buildings elsewhere including Castle Farm which now stands close by.

A subsequent owner of the manor was Viscount Howe, later being sold by heirs to Thomas Bateman, whose family held Hartington Hall. Bateman built Middleton Hall in 1815 in place of an older house which had burned down, renovating the Hall completely with local gritstone in 1824-27. He also rebuilt the entire village in the 1820s, incorporating the mullioned windows of earlier buildings to retain something of an older appearance. The congregational chapel, now a private house, was constructed by Bateman in 1826. His grandson Thomas Bateman Junior had laid the chapel's foundation stone when he was just 4 years old, and inherited the Middleton estate on his grandfather's death in May 1847. Three years prior he had built Lomberdale Hall in Youlgreave, and this was enlarged in 1856 to house his growing collection of archaeological artefacts. Thomas died at the early age of 39 in 1861, but had in his relatively young life examined around 500 barrows or burial mounds, and to have excavated a significant number of valuable Bronze Age artefacts which are now housed at Sheffield City Museum. His book Ten Years Digging was published just two weeks before he died. He was buried in "Bateman's Tomb" close to the chapel, surrounded by iron railings and atop of which is a stone replica of a Bronze Age urn, in reference to his interests. There was a school in the village attended by about 40 children since the middle 1800s until at least 1895. A number of churches existed within Middleton; the most substantial, St Michael and All Angels' Chapel is of unknown origin but thought to have been built from the 16th century onwards, and fell into disuse towards the end of the 19th. It was then refurbished in 1899 and in use since.

Middleton Hall and the surrounding park was sold by Thomas Bateman's estate at the end of the 19th century in lieu of debts and death duties. It was later owned by the Waterhouse Family who were direct relations of the Duke of Marlborough, and friends of the English Royal Family. The family later closed the only public house, the Bateman Arms in 1918, which is now a private residence known as Square House, set to one side of the village square. The village shop closed in the second half of the 20th century. Between 1999 and 2006 locals and the parish council pursued the Sites of Meaning project, with funds being raised to erect stone markings alongside the 17 entrances to the parish, each with a different design and inscriptions from a member of the community or a group, as well as a central marker in the village square.

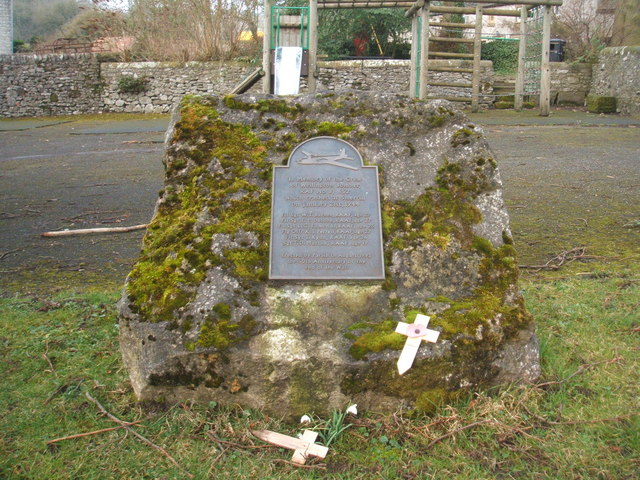
War Memorial

==== Smerrill ====
Little documentation exists about the medieval settlement of Smerrill. It was a grange in 1211 when it was recorded as belonging to the Duchy of Lancaster, later passing to the monks of Roche Abbey. The earthwork, buried and standing remains of the abandoned areas of Smerrill village are well preserved and retain important archaeological and ecological deposits. The earthworks indicate the layout of the early village and how it integrated into the wider medieval landscape. It appears the settlement was possibly later cleared to make way for the grange.

By the end of the 19th century Smerrill Grange comprised one farm owned by the Duke of Rutland, which had been built in the late 16th century. During World War II, on 21 January 1944, a Wellington Bomber, RAF No. BJ 652 crashed close to Smerrill Grange along with six Royal Australian Air Force crew members who perished in the aftermath. A memorial was erected by the Middleton village playground in 1995 on the 50th anniversary of the end of World War II. It depicts the bomber and has a bronze plaque with the names of the crew inscribed.

== Governance and demography ==
=== Population ===
There are 133 residents recorded within Middleton and Smerrill for the 2021 census, a small reduction from the 137 counted at the 2011 census.

=== Local bodies ===
Although with a small population, Middleton and Smerrill is managed at the first level of public administration through a parish council.

At district level, the wider area is overseen by Derbyshire Dales district council, and because of its inclusion within a national park, the Peak District Park Authority. Derbyshire County Council provides the highest level strategic services locally.

== Economy ==
=== Historic ===
Limekilns locations have been recorded locally, suggesting limestone mining and processing taking place in the vicinity from medieval times, until the end of the 19th century.

To the northeast of the parish, there was a water powered corn mill by the River Bradford, in use until the end of the 19th century.

Lead mining activity took place throughout the parish since the 16th century. Notably, a lengthy ore vein known as the Long Rake opencast mine was excavated alongside the Long Rake lane, beside the parish northern boundary well into the 20th century.

A mine producing umber (a mix of iron and manganese oxides) reusing an old lead workings site was close to Smerrill Moor in the south of the parish.

There were quarries also mining sandstone in the 20th century for the nearby Friden Brick Works based, in Hartington Nether Quarter parish, with a narrow-gauge railway running through into Middleton Common and Kenslow Knoll to transport the output of those areas, continuing until the late 1970s.

=== Present ===
There is a sizeable site north of Middleton Common alongside the Long Rake lane used for the supply of aggregates for landscaping, decorative surface dressing for resin bound applications, pebble dashing and flooring, operating since the middle 1980s. Several large local farms provide mostly sheep and dairy farming in an area where the limestone rock outcrops in almost every field meaning there is little soil for arable farming. Some farms also cater to Peak District visitors, with holiday accommodation and bed & breakfast facilities.

Other local businesses include a upholsters and furnishings workshop, collectors of vintage vehicles and a cast iron design and fix company.

== Community, culture and leisure ==
=== Amenities ===
Middleton has a village hall and a small recreation area on the south side of the square in the centre of the village – and unusually for a Peak District location, there are public convenience facilities in the centre of the village to provide for tourists to the village.

A number of farms provides holiday accommodation and bed & breakfast facilities, to cater for Peak District visitors.

The village holds an annual market held at the weekend of the well-dressing ceremony.

=== Paths ===
The Limestone Way long distance walking route skirts the north east boundary close to the River Bradford.

The Limey Way is a 65-kilometre (40 mi) challenge walk through Derbyshire, England, passing Smerrill Grange midway through.

=== Well dressing activities ===
The parish has performed these since 1977, taking place annually in May or June, the displays remaining on view for a week.

=== Festival ===
Middleton Rocks is an annual one-day music event featuring several bands held in the centre of the village, with food and drink stalls, alongside various activities.

=== Sites Of Meaning ===
This was a millennium project started by locals with support from the parish council. Boundary stones mark the seventeen entrances to its parish, with each inscribed with a text chosen by members of the parish, being a public expression of private thoughts and feelings at the start of the new millennium. The project was begun in 1999 and completed in 2006.

== Landmarks ==
=== Conservation ===
There is a conservation area covering the immediate environs of Middleton village, spanning from Middleton Hall through the square to Castle Farm.

There are 31 listed structures within the parish, including Middleton Hall, Thomas Bateman's Congregational Chapel along with his tomb close by, an ex-telephone defibrillator kiosk and several farmhouses.

There are 12 monument sites, including the Arbor Low henge, Smerrill village and several tumuli.

=== Physical features ===
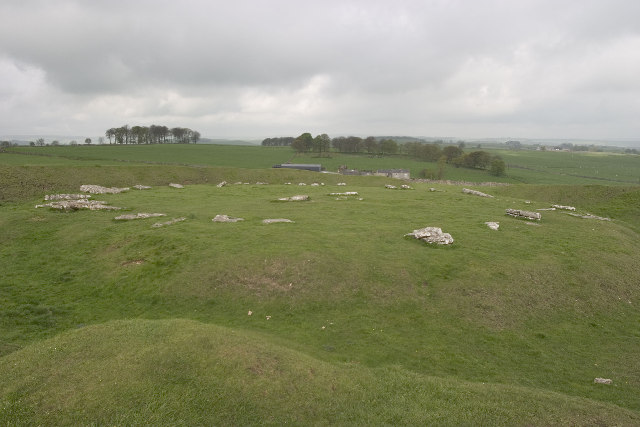
Arbor Low

==== Arbor Low ====
This is a stone circle henge in the far west of the parish within Middleton Common. It is a druidical circle, the stones forming the circle are from six to eight feet in length, and three to four feet in width, unhewn and of varied shapes. The original number of stones is unknown as many of them have been broken, but there potentially were from 30 to 35, all of which lie horizontally on the ground and are angled towards the centre. The circle is about 150 feet in diameter and is surrounded by a vallum and entrenchment with openings or entrances on the north and south sides.

==== Tumuli and ruins ====
There are small remains of Fulwood Castle in Middleton, and Smerrill village close to the present grange farm. Several tumuli exist throughout the parish, in Middleton Common the most notable are Gib Hill which has the remains of a possible henge, Kenslow Knoll and Ringham Low, with others in Smerrill Moor.

== Religious sites ==
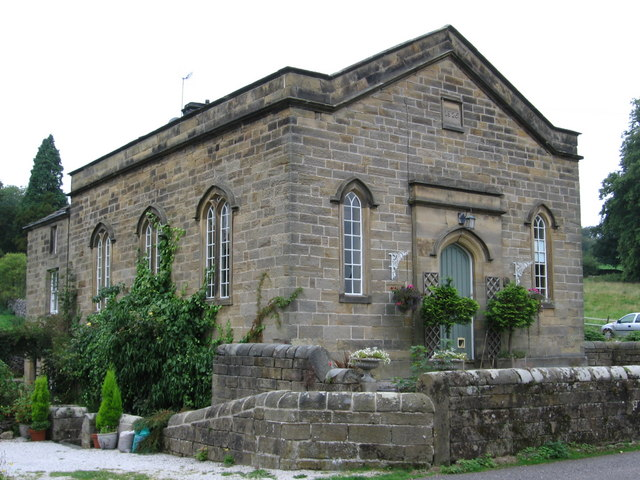
Congregational Chapel built by Thomas Bateman in 1826

=== Anglican ===
St Michael and All Angels' Chapel is the parish church for the Anglicanism faith. It is of unknown date but thought to have been built from the 16th century onwards, and fell into disuse towards the end of the 19th. It was then refurbished in 1899 and in use since.

=== Other denominations ===
The Independents Congregational Chapel was built in 1826 by Thomas Bateman, his grandson buried in a tomb nearby. The chapel was later converted to holiday accommodation in the late 1970s and more latterly as a private cottage.

The Primitive Methodists had a chapel, which was a temporary structure of wood erected in 1850. The congregation later moved to a nearby small permanent structure which is still intact into the 21st century but is presently utilised as a farm annex.
