= Mr Motivator =

British fitness instructor

Mr Motivator MBE
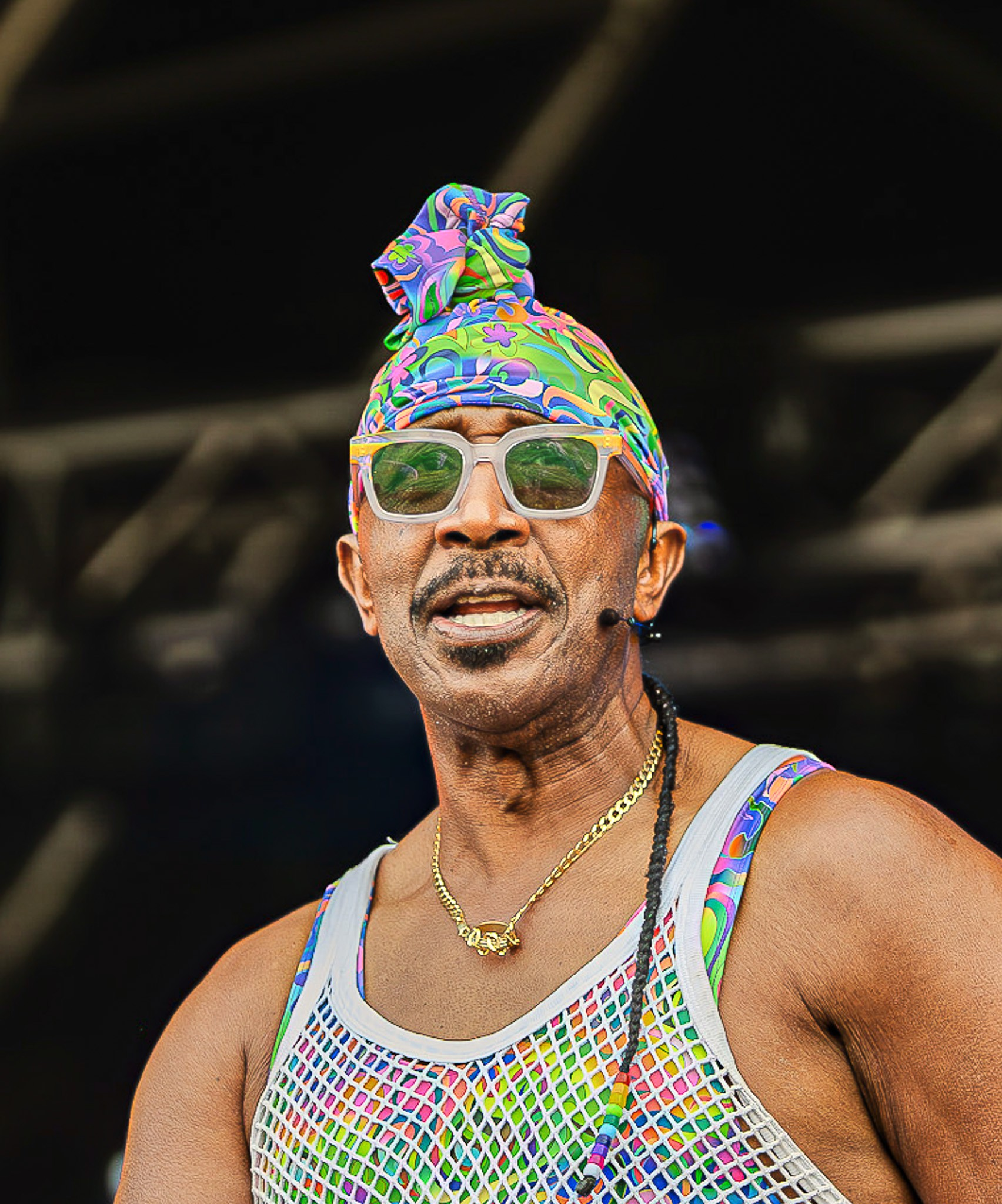
- Mr Motivator in 2025
- Born: Derrick Errol Evans; 15 November 1952 (age 73); Manchester Parish, Jamaica
- Occupations: Fitness instructor and motivational speaker
- Years active: 1993–present
- Known for: Mr Motivator exercise routines on GMTV
- Spouse: Sandra Evans (m. 1996)
- Children: 3
- Website: mrmotivator.com

Derrick Errol Evans MBE (born 15 November 1952), better known as Mr Motivator, is a British fitness instructor. He rose to fame in 1993 through appearances on the UK breakfast television show GMTV, where he performed live fitness sessions and offered tips and advice to viewers. Following the rise in popularity of his fitness sessions, he released a number of fitness and workout videos in the 1990s.

== Early life ==
Evans was born on 15 November 1952 in Manchester Parish, Jamaica, to a single mother who gave him away when he was three months old. His adoptive father, Stanford Rose, was a farmer on a small farm in Jamaica. In 1961, his adoptive family moved to Leicester in the UK, where his father worked as a labourer in a knitwear factory. His mother, Teresa, left the UK after two years because of the climate, but his adoptive father stayed until Evans was 17.

== Career ==
=== Pre-fitness career ===
Evans' first job at 17 was working for the East Midlands Gas Board in the customer complaints department. He sold costume jewellery in high street shops and became financially secure.

=== Origins of Mr Motivator ===
In 1983, he taught exercise classes at a church hall in Neasden, North West London. His classes became popular and he was asked by the British Heart Foundation to give classes throughout the country. He applied repeatedly to be taken on by ITV and In 1992 he was recommended to the producer of the Thames TV health education series the Full Treatment, where he appeared giving fitness advice for one series. In 1993, Peter Mchugh hired him for the breakfast show GMTV.

Evans said the name Mr Motivator came from street performances he, Richard Madeley and Judy Finnigan gave to crowds in shopping centres and streets. Finnigan shouted that Evans was a motivator and the name stuck.

=== GMTV (1993–2000) ===
Evans found fame on the British breakfast programme GMTV in 1993 as Mr. Motivator, promoting health and fitness as a way of life. He performed fitness routines live on-air in highly coloured outfits, which quickly became his trademark. His appearances on GMTV led to Evans becoming (as Mr Motivator) well known in the UK. Evans' popularity on GMTV led to the release of a number of fitness videos including Mr. Motivator's 10 Minute BLTs, Mr. Motivator's 10 Minute Workouts, Body Conditioner: Shot in Barbados, BLT2: Shot in Australia, and Bums Legs & Tums. He is reported to have sold the most fitness DVDs in the UK.

Evans left GMTV in 2000, and went back to Jamaica because his daughter had breathing problems.

After settling back down in Jamaica, Evans then started up a tourism business called H'Evans Scent, which offers activities such as ziplining and paintballing. Evans continued to make personal appearances at events in the UK for the following decade. After leaving GMTV, and together with his son Benjamin, Evans formed his production company "Wicked Productions" and continued to release fitness videos.

=== GMTV return (2009) ===
In 2009, Evans returned to GMTV as Mr Motivator for a three-week-long special to promote the public health programme Change4Life. This led to Evans meeting the then British Prime Minister, Gordon Brown, in promotion of the NHS Change4Life campaign. Evans also released in 2016 his autobiography The Warm Up, which chronicled his story of growing up in Jamaica.

=== Return to television (2014–2016) ===
In June 2014, the BBC announced that Evans would compete on a new Saturday gymnastics competition programme, Tumble, but he had to withdraw after dislocating his knee, necessitating surgery.

Since 2015, Evans has performed fitness routines on stage at the annual Y Not Festival held in Pikehall, Derbyshire.

In 2016, Evans appeared on Lorraine to promote his new book titled The Warm Up.

=== Coronavirus pandemic period (2020–2021) ===
In 2020, he joined BBC television's HealthCheck UK Live to "keep Britain fit in lockdown" during the COVID-19 pandemic, in line with the resurgence in home-based workout routines. Evans also worked with in May 2020 performed live workouts on Ideal World for a workout routine all in aid of AgeUK.

In February 2021, Evans announced a partnership with Umbrella Training, where Evans hosted a series of online exercise classes, titled "No More Banana Bread", to help support the mental and physical wellbeing of Umbrella Training's apprentices, business partners and the wider hospitality industry.

Also in February 2021, he recorded a special video message of support for Swindon's famous Oasis Leisure Centre, which permanently closed due to the pandemic.

In April 2021, Evans worked with Colchester Borough Council and the Essex FaNs Network to deliver a series of online exercise classes for staff and residents in over 70 care homes throughout Essex. Evans also joined British Olympians Greg Rutherford, Nicola Adams, and Kelly Smith in launching the 'Energy Fit for the Futurend' campaign by Smart Energy GB, which aimed at encouraging people to install smart meters in their homes.

In May 2021, Evans worked with Oasis, The Children's Society and Applause for Thought for their "Body and Soul" campaign, which encouraged over 30,000 taking part in online workout routines in schools, performing arts colleges and community centres across the United Kingdom. As part of "Get Travelling Week", Evans worked with TTG and ABTA to provide a series of online exercise classes, aimed at encouraging businesses in the tourism industry to focus on employee wellbeing.

Later that month, Evans also provided a morning workout routine for people taking part in Centrepoint's STAY:UP campaign to raise money to support young homeless people.

== Personal life ==
Evans lives with his wife Sandra Palmer and has previously been in a relationship with Olympic javelin champion Tessa Sanderson. Evans lost his 12-year-old grandchild to meningitis in November 2021, saying "the past few months were the darkest of my life".

Evans was appointed Member of the Order of the British Empire (MBE) in the 2020 Birthday Honours for services to health and fitness.

== Bibliography ==
- Evans, Derrick (2016). The Warm Up, Filament Publishing, Croydon, UK ISBN 978-1910819579
