= Listed buildings in Middleton and Smerrill =

Middleton and Smerrill is a civil parish in the Derbyshire Dales district of Derbyshire, England. The parish contains 31 listed buildings that are recorded in the National Heritage List for England. All the listed buildings are designated at Grade II, the lowest of the three grades, which is applied to "buildings of national importance and special interest". The parish contains the village of Middleton-by-Youlgreave and the surrounding countryside. Most of the listed buildings are houses, cottages and associated structures, farmhouses and farm buildings. The other listed buildings include a church, a former chapel with a tomb in its grounds, a smithy, a former public house, a drinking fountain and a telephone kiosk.

== Buildings ==
Name and location	Photograph	Date	Notes
Smerrill Grange; 53.15413°N 1.70310°W		Late 16th century	A farmhouse that has been refashioned, it is in gritstone with stone slate roofs and coped gables. There are two storeys and attics, and an L-shaped plan. The doorway on the southwest front has a tooled surround and a flat hood on moulded brackets. Some of the windows have single lights, and most are chamfered and mullioned.
Castle Farmhouse and barn 53.16770°N 1.70768°W	—	17th century	The farmhouse, which was extended in the 18th century, and the barn attached to the south, are in limestone with gritstone dressings, quoins, a chamfered eaves band, and a tile roof with coped gables and moulded kneelers. The farmhouse has three storeys and a T-shaped plan, consisting of a front range and a rear wing. Most of the windows are mullioned, and there are two doorways with massive surrounds. The barn has irregular openings with stone surrounds.
Flaxdale House; 53.16560°N 1.70961°W		17th century	The house is in limestone with gritstone dressings, quoins, a tile roof on the main range, and stone slates to the rear range. There are two storeys and an L-shaped plan, with an added bay to the east. The doorway has a stone surround, and the windows are later replacements.
Dale Farmhouse and outbuildings 53.16623°N 1.70917°W		18th century	The farmhouse and attached outbuildings are in limestone with gritstone dressings and a roof of Welsh slate and stone slate. The house has three storeys and a single bay, and contains a doorway with a massive surround and casement windows. At the west end are outbuildings in an L-shaped plan with a single storey and mullioned windows, and at the east end is a two-storey building containing doorways with quoined surrounds, most converted into windows.
Cottage southeast of Dale Farmhouse; 53.16611°N 1.70896°W		18th century	A cottage and stable with a hayloft later combined into a cottage, it is in limestone with gritstone dressings and a stone slate roof. There are two storeys and two bays. The central doorway has a massive surround, it is flanked by two-light mullioned windows, and in the upper floor are single-light windows.
Greencroft Farmhouse; 53.16481°N 1.70930°W		18th century	The farmhouse is in roughcast limestone with gritstone dressings, and has a Welsh slate roof with coped gables and kneelers. There are two ranges with two storeys, the western part lower. Most of the windows are sashes, and in the south wall are two two-light mullioned windows.
Cowhouse, Mount Pleasant Farm; 53.15406°N 1.71672°W	—	18th century	The cowhouse west of the farmhouse is in limestone with gritstone dressings, quoins, and a stone slate roof. There are two storeys and a symmetrical front containing four doorways with massive quoined surrounds, a full-height taking-in door, and smaller upper floor doorways. Attached to the east and recessed is a lower outbuilding with two storeys and two bays, containing various openings.
Outbuildings, Mount Pleasant Farm; 53.15384°N 1.71679°W	—	18th century	The three outbuildings are southwest of the farmhouse. The northern building is in limestone with gritstone dressings, a stone slate roof and two storeys. It contains three doorways in the ground floor, and external steps to an upper floor doorway flanked by square openings. To the south is a single-storey limestone cowhouse with a Welsh slate roof that contains three doorways with quoined surrounds. Further to the south, detached and projecting, is a single-storey three-bay cartshed with a slate roof, and square stone pillars supporting massive lintels.
Outbuildings north of Kings Croft; 53.16568°N 1.71006°W		Late 18th century	The outbuildings are in limestone with quoins and a tile roof. They form a stepped range, with two storeys at the east end, and one at the west. The outbuildings contain doorways and a taking-in door with massive stone surrounds.
Three cottages northwest of The Square House; 53.16597°N 1.70881°W		Late 18th century	The cottages are in limestone with gritstone dressings, quoins, and a stone slate roof hipped at the north end. There are two storeys, an L-shaped plan, and a front of three bays. The doorways have massive surrounds, and the windows are mullioned with two casements.
Four cottages north of the Bateman Arms; 53.16579°N 1.70841°W		1822	The cottages are in limestone with gritstone dressings and a stone slate roof. There are two storeys and four bays. The doorways have plain surrounds, and the windows are mullioned with two casements. All the ground floor openings have hood moulds, and in the centre of the upper floor is a circular dated plaque.
Middleton Hall; 53.16411°N 1.71037°W		c. 1824	A small country house designed by Thomas Bateman for his own use. It is in gritstone with parapets hiding a hipped Welsh slate roof. There is an irregular plan, and the south front has two storeys and five bays, the middle bay projecting, with an arched porch, and a doorway with a moulded architrave. Above this is a moulded string course, a mullioned window, and a parapet with blind balustrading. The outer bays contain mullioned and transomed windows with moulded surrounds containing casements. On the corners are octagonal turrets.
Hollow Meadow Farmhouse; 53.15853°N 1.71743°W	—	Early 19th century	The farmhouse is in limestone with gritstone dressings, quoins, and a stone slate roof. There are two storeys and two bays. In the ground floor is a two-light mullioned window, and above are two single-light windows with chamfered surrounds and Gothic glazing.
Kings Croft; 53.16558°N 1.70999°W		Early 19th century	A house in limestone with gritstone dressings and a stone slate roof. There are two storeys and three bays. The central doorway is recessed in a segmental arch and has a keystone. Above it is a single-light window, and the other windows are mullioned with two lights. All the windows have hood moulds and contain Gothic glazing.
Gate piers, gates and wall, Middleton Hall; 53.16510°N 1.71061°W		Early 19th century	The entrance to the drive is flanked by square stone gate piers about 3 metres (9.8 ft) high with depressed pyramidal tops. These are flanked by curving limestone walls with saddleback coping, and between the piers are heavy ornamental cast iron gates.
Stable block, Middleton Hall; 53.16457°N 1.71119°W		Early 19th century	The stable block is in gritstone, and has a Welsh slate roof with coped gables. There are two storeys and an L-shaped plan. The north range has three bays, a crowstepped gable at the west end, embattled square turrets at the corners containing arrow slits, with smaller turrets between the bays. The windows have Gothic glazing and hood moulds, and at the east end is a three-light mullioned window. The south range contains a large arch.
Rock Cottage; 53.16488°N 1.71318°W		Early 19th century	A house in limestone with gritstone dressings, quoins, and a Welsh slate roof. There are two storeys and a staggered double depth plan. On the west front are two gables, with a two-storey canted bay window on the projecting north gable, and full height embattled turrets on the corners. Most of the windows are mullioned with two lights and Gothic glazing. In the angle of the ranges is a porch with an embattled parapet.
Pair of cottages east of Rock Cottage (Rose Cottages); 53.16497°N 1.71227°W		Early 19th century	A mirror-image pair of cottages in limestone with a stone slate roof. There are two storeys and two bays. The doorways in the outer parts have plain surrounds, and the windows are mullioned with two casements. All the ground floor openings have hood moulds.
Four cottages west of The Square House; 53.16572°N 1.70915°W		Early 19th century	The cottages are in limestone with gritstone dressings and a stone slate roof. There are two storeys, and a mix of two-light mullioned windows and single-light windows. All the ground floor openings have hood moulds. In front of the gardens is a limestone wall with half-round gritstone copings, four gateways and a fountain stone with a pointed arched head.
Chapel House; 53.16657°N 1.70909°W		1826	Originally a Congregational chapel with a small house behind, designed by Thomas Bateman, it was later converted into a house. It is in gritstone, the chapel has a roof of Welsh slate with coped gables and parapets, and the house has a stone slate roof. The chapel has two storeys, the windows in the upper floor on the sides have pointed arches and hood moulds and contain Gothic Y-tracery, and in the lower floor they are mullioned. The end facing the road is gabled, and has a central projecting doorway flanked by lancet windows, all with hood moulds, and above is a datestone. The house at the rear has three storeys, and a single bay.
Green Farmhouse; 53.16516°N 1.70829°W		19th century	The farmhouse is in limestone with gritstone dressings, quoins, a moulded eaves band, and a tile roof. There are two storeys, an L-shaped plan, and a front range of three bays. The doorway has a quoined surround, and the windows are sashes, the openings in the ground floor with hood moulds.
Four cottages east of Flaxdale House; 53.16564°N 1.70938°W		19th century	The cottages are in gritstone with a stone slate roof. There are two storeys and four bays. Each cottage has a doorway, a two-light mullioned window in the ground floor, and a single-light window in the upper floor. All the ground floor openings have hood moulds. The front gardens are enclosed by a low limestone boundary wall with half-round gritstone copings and gate piers.
Stable block east of Hall Cottages; 53.16453°N 1.70893°W		19th century	The stable block is in limestone with gritstone dressings, quoins, and a Welsh slate roof with moulded gable copings and kneelers, and two storeys. On the north gable end is a loading door with a clock face above, and on the roof is a small square tower with louvres, and a lead-covered pyramidal roof. On the west front are two doorways with quoined surrounds and single-light windows with chamfered surrounds. Attached to the north is a wall with saddleback copings, containing a gateway with rusticated square gate piers with depressed pyramidal caps.
Ice house 53.16439°N 1.70925°W	—	19th century	The ice house is in limestone. It has a low entrance with a shallow lintel and a quoined surround that leads to the ice pit by way of a narrow tunnel. The tunnel and the pit are lined with rectangular stone slabs.
Mount Pleasant Farmhouse; 53.15406°N 1.71630°W	—	19th century	The farmhouse is in limestone with gritstone dressings, and a stone slate roof with coped gables and kneelers. There are two storeys and three bays, and a lower two-storey range at the southwest. The central doorway has a quoined surround, and a hood on moulded brackets, and the windows date from the 20th century.
Smithy; 53.16583°N 1.70820°W		19th century	The smithy is in limestone with a stone slate roof. There are two storeys and a single-storey shed at the east end. In the north front is a single rectangular cast iron window.
The Square House; 53.16564°N 1.70846°W		19th century	Formerly a public house, the Bateman Arms, later a private house, it is in gritstone, and has a stone slate roof with coped gables. There are two storeys and three bays, the outer bays gabled. The central doorway is recessed in a segmental stone arch, and the windows are mullioned, those in the ground floor with hood moulds.
Tor Farmhouse; 53.16537°N 1.70802°W		19th century	The farmhouse is in limestone with gritstone dressings, a moulded eaves band, and a tile roof with coped gables and plain kneelers. There are two storeys, an L-shaped plan, and a front of three bays. The central doorway has a massive surround and the windows are replacements. The ground floor openings have hood moulds.
Bateman's tomb, Chapel House; 53.16661°N 1.71008°W		1861	The tomb in the grounds of the former chapel is to the memory of Thomas Bateman. It is in stone and rectangular, and is surmounted by an inscribed stone model of a Bronze Age cinerary urn. The tomb is enclosed by cast iron railings on a low stone plinth.
Water Supply Fountain; 53.16594°N 1.70861°W		1876	The drinking fountain is in stone, and consists of an arch on columns set into a quoined recess in a wall. The arch has incised voussoirs and a keystone. Under the arch is an inscription and the date.
Telephone kiosk 53.16549°N 1.70917°W		1935	The K6 type telephone kiosk in The Square was designed by Giles Gilbert Scott. Constructed in cast iron with a square plan and a dome, it has three unperforated crowns in the top panels.
