= Y Not Festival =

English annual music festival

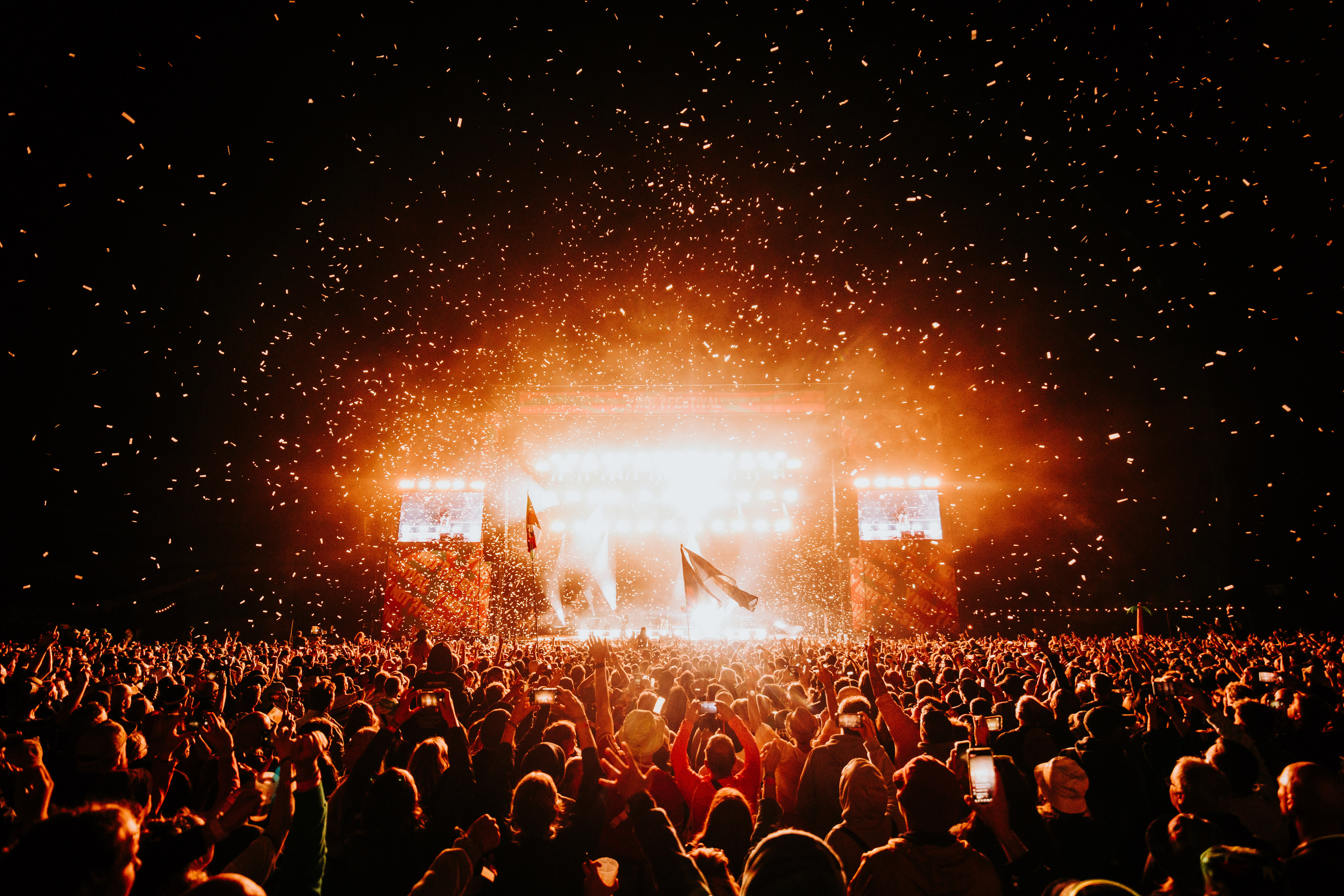
- The Big Gin stage in 2022.
- Genre: Rock, alternative rock, indie rock, dance, world, punk rock, electronic music, reggae, folk, hip hop
- Dates: Last weekend of July/first weekend of August
- Locations: Peak District, England
- Years active: 2006–present
- Website: ynotfestival.com

The Y Not Festival is an annual music festival held in Pikehall, Derbyshire, United Kingdom. It began in 2005 as a house party organized by Ralph Broadbent. In its first year, it was named The Big Gin Festival (a play on its location near Biggin in the Peak District), and the stage used in the festival has retained its name as The Big Gin Stage. The following year, it was renamed Y Not Festival and was opened to the public. In 2007, the festival relocated to its current site at Pikehall in Derbyshire.

The event won awards and accolades at the UK Festival Awards, such as Best Grassroots Event and Best Toilets in 2011 and Best Small Festival in 2012. In 2016, the festival was sold to Global Radio's festival division, Broadwick Live.

The original owners regained ownership of the festival in 2019. The event was not held in 2020 and 2021 as a result of lockdown measures during the COVID-19 pandemic.

In November 2022, it was announced that the UK-company, Superstruct Entertainment, had acquired a majority stake in the Y Not Festival.

== Timeline ==
=== 2006 ===
The first Y Not Festival was held in a quarry in Derbyshire. Around 500 people attended over three days. Many of the bands that played were unsigned or local. A DVD documentary was made about this festival.

=== 2007 ===
The second Y Not Festival was held at a new venue, at Pikehall, Derbyshire, allowing the festival to expand. Around 1000 people attended over the three days of the event.

=== 2008 ===
The third Y Not Festival was again held at Pikehall, Derbyshire. The festival expanded further and around 2000 people attended over three days. Bigger and more well-known acts such as the Mystery Jets, Cage the Elephant, and Frank Turner were featured in the lineup, although both the Mystery Jets and Cage the Elephant cancelled last minute.

=== 2009 ===
The Y Not Festival sold out in 2009. The lineup on the main stage included The Sunshine Underground, The King Blues, Noah and the Whale, Young Knives, Nine Black Alps, Shotshotstacy, and Esser. Beardyman and Frank Turner featured on the acoustic stage.

=== 2010 ===
The Y Not Festival in 2010 was headlined by The Futureheads, The Subways and The Mystery Jets. Other acts included Blood Red Shoes, Los Campesinos, Darwin Deez, King Pleasure and the Biscuit Boys, OK Go, Get Cape. Wear Cape. Fly, Twisted Wheel, Turin Brakes, Rox, Little Comets, Kid British, Daisy Dares You, Slow Club, Goldheart Assembly, Jim Lockey & The Solemn Sun, Tubelord, Foy Vance, Max Raptor, Fenech Soler, Sparrow and the Workshop, THePETEBO, Doll & The Kicks, Sketches, Matthew P, Morning Parade, 51/50s, Kill It Kid, and North Atlantic Oscillation.

The event ran from Friday 30 July – Sunday 1 August. Hoping to cut the overall carbon footprint down to a minimum, festival goers were convinced to take either public transport or ride in personal vehicles, targeting to at least have 60% of festival goers do that. In doing so, rewards like lanyards, programmes, posters, T-shirts and showers were given to festival goers that abided by this. A free shuttle bus that connected both the Buxton - Ashbourne bus route and Matlock railway station to the festival was also added, reducing carbon footprint as well as increasing accessibility. The festival took place on two stages at a site on Mouldridge Lane near Matlock, Derbyshire, where an estimated number of 50 acts were offered.

=== 2011 ===
The 2011 festival was held between 5 – 7 August. It was headlined by The Go! Team, Feeder and Maxïmo Park. The festival was once again located in Pikehall where the capacity was at 5,000 people. The festival's theme that year was "Good vs Evil".

The festival had three music stages:

- The main stage called "Big Gin Stage" named after the first festival
- A smaller stage called "The Quarry" named after the location of the 2006 festival
- "The Allotment" was a new addition to 2011 which hosted a variety of local bands. "The Allotment" stage was named after a competition was held on Facebook and Twitter.

The festival won two categories at the UK Festival Awards, the grass roots festival award and the prize for the best toilets.

=== 2012 ===
The 2012 festival was held between 3 – 5 August. The festival was headlined by The View, The Wombats and We Are Scientists. As well as the three main music stages – the Big Gin Stage, The Quarry and The Allotment – a new stage, The Giant Squid, was introduced.

=== 2013 ===
Y Not Festival 2013 saw Mystery Jets cutting their set short after heavy rains and lightning strikes occurred in the area. Other bands that performed on Y Not 2013 were Dan le Sac Vs Scroobius Pip, The Horrors, Swim Deep, The Cribs, Electric Six, and The Darkness.

=== 2014 ===
The 2014 festival was held between 1 – 3 August. The festival was headlined by White Lies, Dizzee Rascal and Frank Turner.

=== 2015 ===
The 2015 festival was held between 31 July and 2 August. The festival was headlined by Snoop Dogg, Basement Jaxx and Primal Scream, while Ash, Beans on Toast, Asylums and Bloxed Beats played the festival on Thursday 30 July as the early entry acts.

=== 2016 ===
The festival was held between 28 – 31 July. It was headlined by Editors, Noel Gallagher's High Flying Birds, Madness, The Hives, Catfish and the Bottlemen and The Cribs.

=== 2017 ===
In 2017, the festival was affected by adverse weather conditions and was eventually cancelled on the final day following consultation with relevant authorities and worsening weather conditions. Refunds were issued as compensation.

=== 2018 ===
As a result of the 2017 cancellation, Y Not Festival 2018 was relocated to Aston Hill Farm, close to the old site of Mouldridge Lane. The festival hosted bands such as The Libertines, Manic Street Preachers, Seasick Steve and Jamiroquai in that year.

=== 2019 ===
The 2019 festival was held from 25 – 28 July. On Saturday, the event was headlined by Two Door Cinema Club, supported by a guest appearance from IDLES. Gerry Cinnamon played a set on Friday. Mike Skinner from The Streets and Jax Jones both made appearances at the event with DJ sets. Bands The Wired and Airways were scheduled to play at the festival, however, due to unannounced delays, doors to the event were opened over 2 hours after the posted time of 4pm, and therefore their sets were cancelled.

=== 2020 & 2021 (cancelled) ===
The website announced that Y Not Festival 2020 would be cancelled due to COVID-19 restrictions, offering two options for people that have already bought their tickets:

- Option 1 offered a swap for a 2021 ticket, with a free early entry pass on the festival's Thursday. If they already have an early entry pass, they are promised a VIP upgrade, but if the festival goers already have a VIP pass, they get free parking on Y Not Festival 2021. They further the benefits for this option with the ticket buyers being entered automatically to a free prize draw for one of the festival's luxury cabins for Y Not 2021. They explain the reason for these benefits, saying that everyone who rolls over their ticket to 2021 is helping "ensure the survival of the festival".
- Option 2 offers a full refund. Failing to refund the ticket within four weeks from the Y Not 2020 cancellation announcement automatically changes the ticket into a 2021 ticket, with all the Option 1 conditions applied.

When 2021 came, however, the website announced on 1 July that Y Not Festival would have to be delayed until 2022. The festival did not make it to the government-sponsored Event Research Programme, which was a program that permits events to take place, with the intention of studying the risk of COVID-19 transmissions in events and ultimately find the best ways to hold an event. This and the rising cases of COVID-19 both locally and nationally caused the cancellation of Y Not Festival 2021. They reveal being close to selling out, along with the reassurance that all tickets and upgrades will be rolled over to 2022, and that refunds will be made available in a few days after the announcement.

=== 2022 ===
Y Not Festival 2022 was held from 28 – 31 July 2022. The Kooks, Stereophonics, Courteeners and Blossoms played headline sets across the weekend. Other notable performances included a special guest slot from Levellers on Saturday afternoon, and The Vaccines who played the Sunday evening set.

=== 2023 ===
Thursday 27 July	Friday 28 July	Saturday 29 July	Sunday 30 July
Bombay Bicycle Club; Circa Waves	Royal Blood; The Wombats; The Reytons; Mystery Jets; Maisie Peters; The K's; The Pigeon Detectives; Feet; Thomas Headon; Rachel Chinouriri	Kasabian; James; The Lathums; Everything Everything; Sophie Ellis-Bextor; Caity Baser; Kate Nash; Red Rum Club; The Murder Capital; The Lancashire Hotpots; Mr Motivator	Paul Weller; DMA's; The Charlatans; Jamie Webster; Sea Girls; KT Tunstall; Twin Atlantic

=== 2024 ===
Thursday 1 August	Friday 2 August	Saturday 3 August	Sunday 4 August
Kaiser Chiefs; Scouting for Girls; Ten Tonnes	Snow Patrol; The Kooks; Soft Play; Jake Bugg; Yard Act; Black Honey; The Lottery Winners; The Mysterines	Jamie T; Declan McKenna; The Snuts; Pale Waves; Frank Turner; The Clause; The Lancashire Hotpots; Mr Motivator	Noel Gallagher's High Flying Birds; The Vaccines; Holly Humberstone; The View; Katy B; Bob Vylan; Nieve Ella; English Teacher

=== 2025 ===
Y Not Festival 2025 was held from 31 July – 3 August 2025. The Prodigy, Madness, Courteeners & The Wombats performed headline sets across the weekend.

Thursday 31 July	Friday 1 August	Saturday 2 August	Sunday 3 August
The Wombats; Vistas; Pixey	The Prodigy; Primal Scream; Hard Life; Maxïmo Park; The Hunna; The Futureheads; Brooke Combe; Panic Shack; The Slow Readers Club; The Lancashire Hotpots	Courteeners; The Last Dinner Party; Sigrid; Red Rum Club; Professor Green; Lime Garden; The Twang; The Subways; Mr Motivator	Madness; Franz Ferdinand; Shed Seven; The K's; Circa Waves (replacing Annie Mac); The Pigeon Detectives; The Academic; Seb Lowe; Callum Beattie

=== 2026 ===
The 2026 iteration of the festival took place from Thursday 30 July – Sunday 2 August, with headliners The Reytons, Two Door Cinema Club, The Streets & The Libertines.

Thursday 30 July	Friday 31 July	Saturday 1 August	Sunday 2 August
The Libertines; Ash; Hard-Fi	The Reytons; Dizzee Rascal; The Fratellis; The Royston Club; Pale Waves; Reverend and The Makers; Sleeper; The Lancashire Hotpots	Two Door Cinema Club; Kaiser Chiefs; The Vaccines; Happy Mondays; The Enemy; Scouting for Girls; Lucy Spraggan; Inspiral Carpets; Vanessa Carlton; Mr Motivator	The Streets; Scissor Sisters; Rizzle Kicks; Sophie Ellis-Bextor; The Snuts; The Lottery Winners; We Are Scientists; Black Honey
