= Gib Hill =

Neolithic burial mound in Derbyshire, England

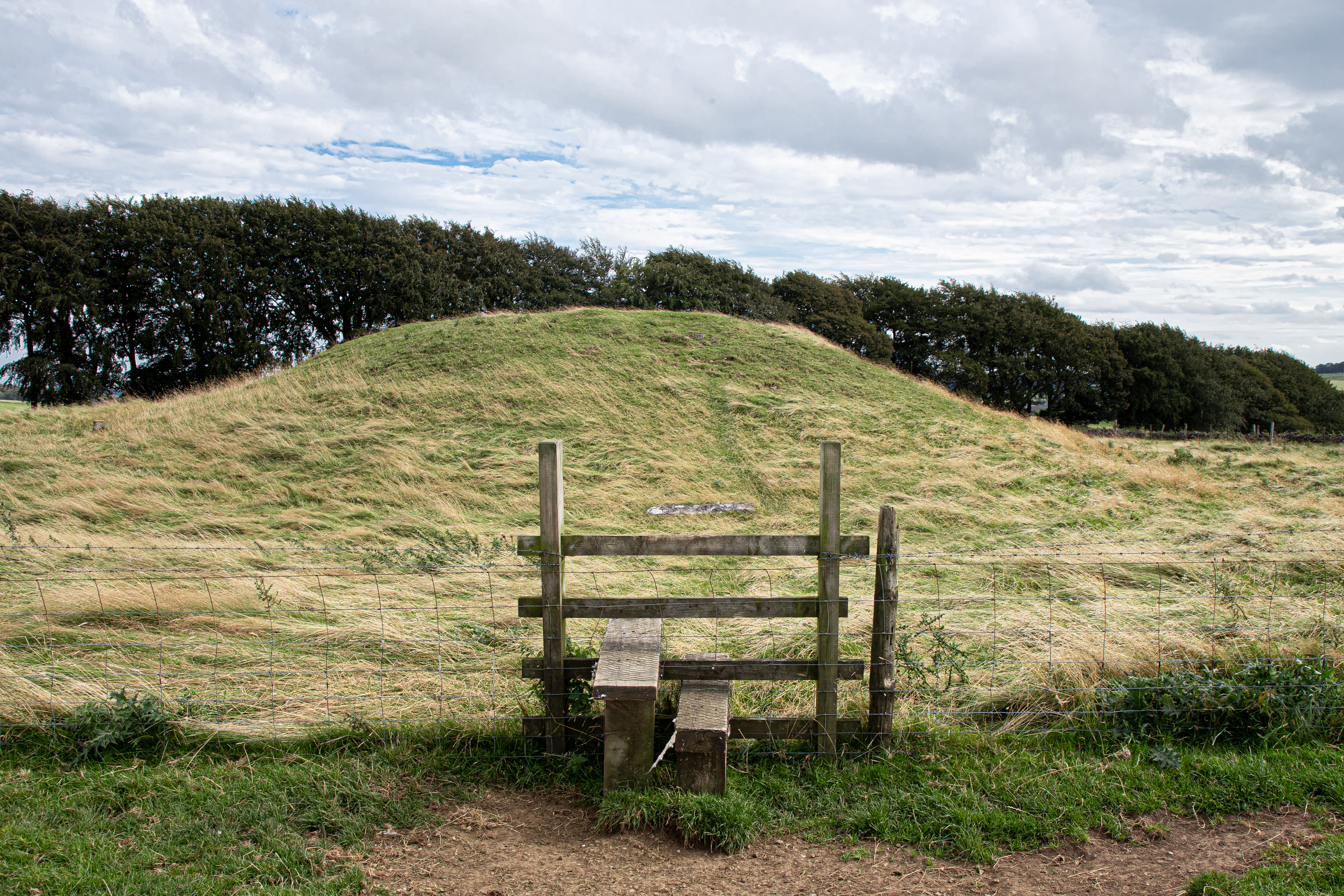
- Gib Hill burial mound
- Interactive map of Gib Hill
- 53°10′01″N 01°45′52″W
- Type: tumulus
- Location: near Middleton-by-Youlgreave and Bakewell
- Region: Derbyshire, England

Gib Hill is a large burial mound in the Peak District, Derbyshire, England. It is thought to be a Neolithic oval barrow with an Early Bronze Age round barrow superimposed at one end. It is located some 300 metres south-west of Arbor Low henge.

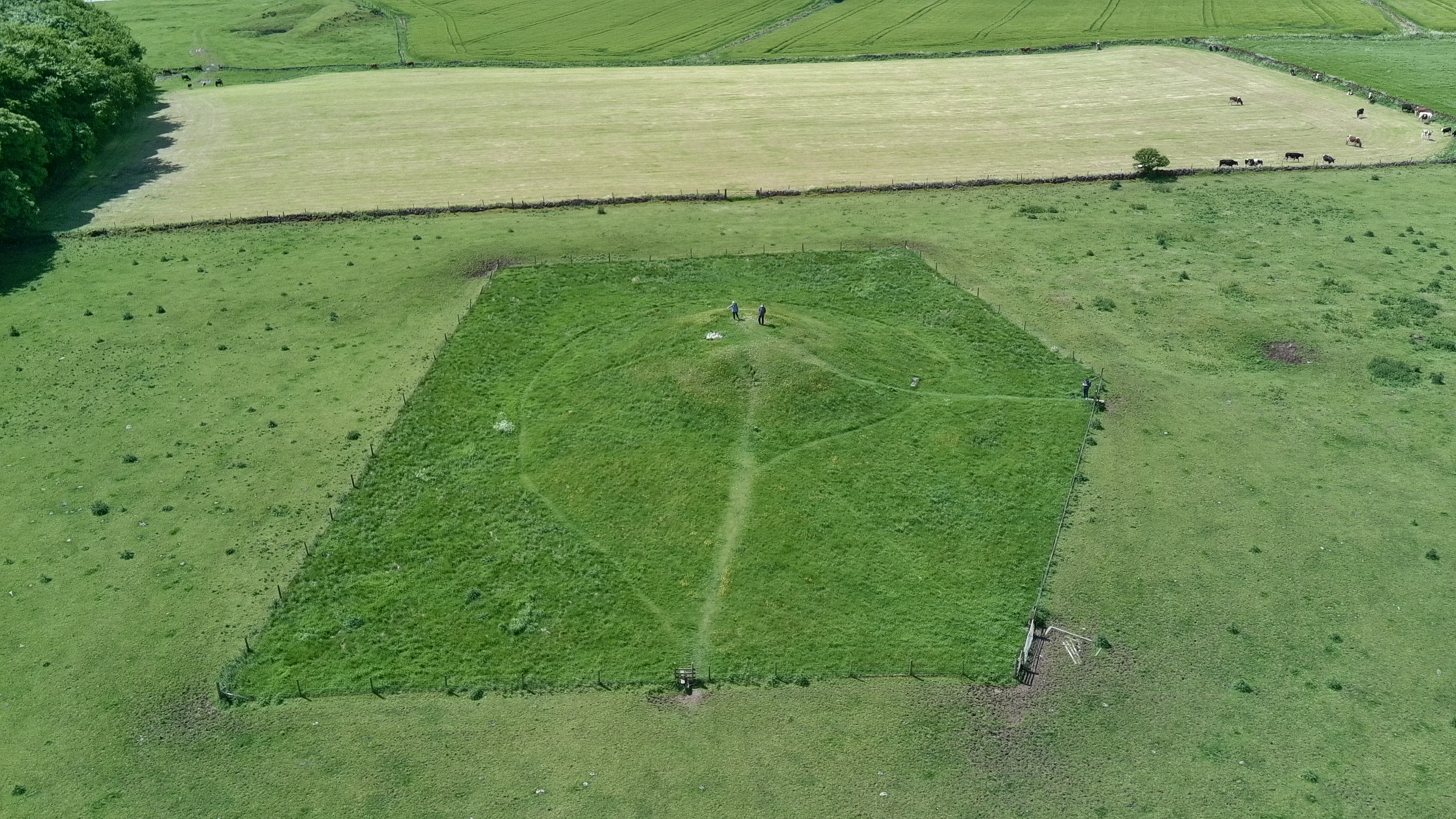
Gib Hill Barrow

== Excavations ==
Three exploratory excavations were conducted in the 19th century: the first by the owner, Mr Thornhill in 1812, a second by William Bateman and S. Mitchell in 1824, and a third by Thomas Bateman in 1848. The 1848 excavations uncovered a cist of early Bronze Age date, containing a cremation and food vessel. The complex structure of the barrow suggests that it consists of a Neolithic oval barrow with an Early Bronze Age round barrow superimposed at one end. This configuration can be seen clearly by looking up at the barrow from the north.

== Siting ==
Gib Hill is part of a complex of prehistoric monuments with Arbor Low. The Neolithic barrow at Gib Hill was probably the first element in the complex.
