= Henry Baines =

Henry Baines may refer to:

- Henry Baines (bishop) (1905–1972), English bishop
- Henry Baines (botanist) (1793–1878), English botanist
