= Ten Tonnes (album) =

Studio album by Ten Tonnes
- Released: 3 May 2019
- Genre: Indie pop
- Length: 38:33
- Label: Warner
- Producer: Hugo White; Dan Grech-Marguerat

Ten Tonnes chronology
Acoustic – EP (2017)	Ten Tonnes (2019)	So Long (2021)

Professional ratings
Review scores
Source	Rating
DIY	4/5 stars
Dork	4/5 stars
Gigwise	8/10 stars
The Guardian	3/5 stars
The Times	4/5 stars

Ten Tonnes is the debut studio album by British singer/songwriter Ten Tonnes. It was released on 3 May 2019 via Warner Records. The album peaked at number 31 on the UK Albums Chart, and number 27 on the Scottish Albums Chart.

== Background and release ==
The album was written by Ethan Barnett, who is known as Ten Tonnes, alongside former Kaiser Chiefs drummer Nick Hodgson and songwriter Crispin Hunt, and was produced by Hugo White of the Maccabees and Dan Grech-Marguerat. Barnett officially announced the album on social media on 8 November 2018. Originally slated for 5 April 2019, it was pushed back and instead released on 3 May 2019.

Speaking about the album, Barnett said, "It’s amazing that I get to work with these people and get to call them friends and colleagues. My only ambition was to have an album out, so it feels quite strange that it’s happening." Barnett has cited American musician Tom Petty as an inspiration for the album.

== Critical reception ==
Writing for DIY, Eloise Bulmer calls the album "a crisp collection of songs, and one that is sure to serve him well on the festival circuit come summer." Reviewing the album for Dork, Jamie McMillian writes, "While most of the record is built on the adventures of someone who is very-nearly-but-not-quite lucky in love, it is also the tale of life in a town that you want to escape but miss like hell when you do", and declares that "Lay It On Me" "rolls in like an encore".

Lauren Wade of Gigwise calls the opening track "Lucy" a "Festival anthem-in-waiting" and that "Barnett delivers on a truckload of promise and hype on his self-titled debut album as Ten Tonnes." Kitty Empire of The Guardian says the songs "may be breezy guitar singalongs, but they are a smidge less Jack Wills and a tad more Kooks than George Ezra's." Reviewing the album for The Times, Will Hodgkinson claims the debut album "harks back to the sharp but tuneful early-Eighties world of Elvis Costello and the raucous innocence of mid-Noughties indie".

== Track listing ==
Credits adapted from Tidal.

No.	Title	Writer(s)	Producer(s)	Length
1.	"Lucy"	Ethan Barnett	Hugo White	2:46
2.	"G.I.V.E."	Barnett; Luke Potashnick	Dan Grech-Marguerat	3:08
3.	"Cracks Between"	Barnett	White	3:14
4.	"Counting Down"	Barnett	Grech-Marguerat	3:25
5.	"Too Late"	Barnett; Potashnick	White	3:25
6.	"Nights In, Nights Out"	Barnett; Nick Hodgson	White	3:21
7.	"Better Than Me"	Barnett; Hodgson	Grech-Marguerat	3:21
8.	"Look What You Started"	Barnett; Crispin Hunt	Grech-Marguerat	2:59
9.	"Silver Heat"	Barnett	White	2:53
10.	"Wake Up"	Barnett	Grech-Marguerat	3:16
11.	"Lay It on Me"	Barnett; Hodgson	White	3:36
12.	"Missing You"	Barnett; Potashnick	White	3:09
Total length:				38:33

== Charts ==
Chart (2019)	Peak position
UK Albums (OCC)	31
Scottish Albums (OCC)	27

== In popular culture ==
The ninth track from the album, "Silver Heat", appeared in Need for Speed Payback.
