= Dancing, Alone =

Studio album by Ten Tonnes
- Released: 28 July 2023
- Genre: Indie pop
- Length: 46:09
- Label: Silver Heat Records
- Producer: Ten Tonnes; Charles Macdonald

Ten Tonnes chronology
So Long (2021)	Dancing, Alone (2023)	Heaven Sent (2025)

Professional ratings
Review scores
Source	Rating
Clash	7/10 stars
The Line of Best Fit	8/10 stars
Gigwise	7/10 stars

Dancing, Alone is the second studio album by British singer/songwriter Ten Tonnes. It was released on 28 July 2023 via Silver Heat Records, Ten Tonnes' own label. Dancing, Alone is Ten Tonnes' first album as an independent artist, after parting ways with Warner Records. The album peaked at number 19 on the UK Independent Albums Chart.

== Background and release ==
On 8 February 2023, Ten Tonnes, whose real name is Ethan Barnett, announced the album on social media, with a release date of 28 July 2023, and alongside the announcement, he released the album's first single, "Monday Morning". In the announcement, Barnett said, "I have written, produced and performed this record myself and it means the world to me. I can't wait for you to hear it, I am so immensely proud of it." Speaking about "Monday Morning", he states, "I wrote this song at the tail end of 2020 while I was trying lots of different ideas out for the new album. I think lyrically it's a clear reflection of where my mental health was at the point. The opening verses are very introspective and dark at points and I wanted the chorus to open up and feel a lot more euphoric in contrast."

The second single, "Dancing, Alone", was released on 5 April 2023.

The third single, "Lone Star", was released on 9 May 2023.

The fourth single, "Drowning in the Deep End", was released on 14 June 2023.

== Critical reception ==
Writing for Clash, Narzra Ahmed admitted "some of the songs are a little cheesy in both their production and – to an extent – the lyrical content" but that they are "never overtly so and we embrace this because the tracks are so relatable." Reviewing the album for The Line of Best Fit, Christopher Hamilton-Peach states, "Barnett situates a meditative focus at the forefront without sacrificing a high-octane persona", and declares "downtempo and runaway momentum exist in harmony, leaving space for diverging themes to be aired in a free-flowing fashion and in continuity with the first album’s contagious core". Karl Blakesley of Gigwise said the album "is the sound of Barnett finding his feet as a recording musician again", and that it's one that "gets back-to-basics, as Barnett crafts an assured collection of no-fuss rock ‘n’ roll anthems, filled with hypnotic and varied riffs alongside big singalong choruses."

== Track listing ==
Credits adapted from Tidal.

No.	Title	Writer(s)	Producer(s)	Length
1.	"Monday Morning"	Ethan Barnett	Barnett	3:36
2.	"Heart To Break"	Barnett	Barnett	3:27
3.	"Dancing, Alone"	Barnett	Barnett; Charles Macdonald	4:06
4.	"When It Goes"	Barnett	Barnett	3:33
5.	"Lone Star"	Barnett	Barnett	4:27
6.	"Out Of Here"	Barnett	Barnett	4:35
7.	"Drowning In The Deep End"	Barnett	Barnett	4:00
8.	"The Joke Got Old"	Barnett	Barnett	3:06
9.	"Weight Of The World"	Barnett	Barnett	3:25
10.	"Come On Home"	Barnett	Barnett	3:35
11.	"Give It Up"	Barnett	Barnett	3:55
12.	"Waiting For The Sun"	Barnett	Barnett	4:25
Total length:				46:10
