= Thomas Joseph Banks =

British artist

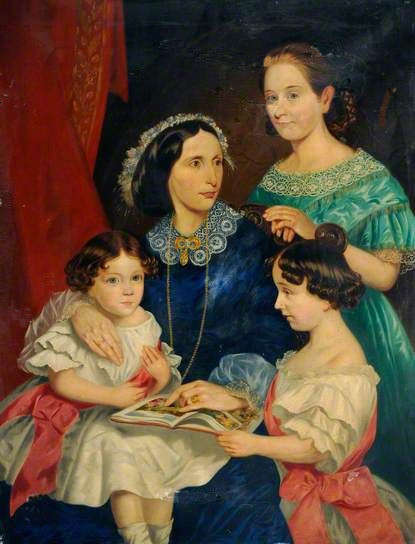
Sarah Bateman and her three daughters by Thomas Banks

Thomas Joseph Banks (1828–1896), sometimes known as "Thomas John Banks", was a British portrait and landscape painter.

He died in Goathland, and an obituary notice in The British Architect described him as "a Yorkshire artist of considerable local repute".

His works include:

- Henry Baines (1793–1878) of York
- Thomas Bateman and his son
- The Farne Islands
