= Friden, Derbyshire =

Hamlet in Derbyshire, England

Coordinates: 53.143°N 1.746°W

Friden
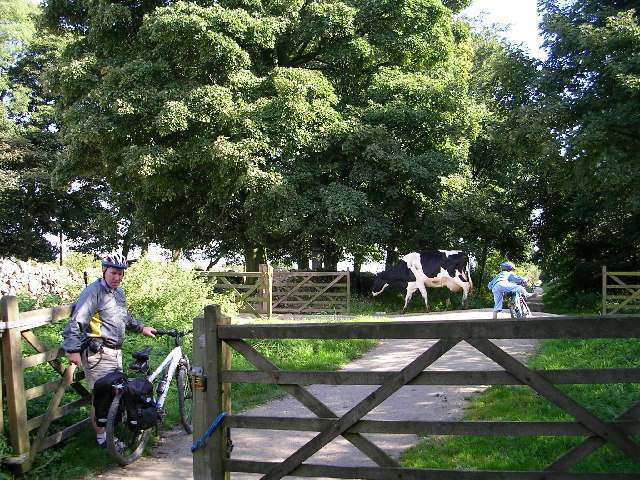
- High Peak Trail at Friden

- Location within Derbyshire
- OS grid reference: SK166603
- District: Derbyshire Dales
- Shire county: Derbyshire
- Region: East Midlands
- Country: England
- Sovereign state: United Kingdom
- Post town: BUXTON
- Postcode district: SK17
- Police: Derbyshire
- Fire: Derbyshire
- Ambulance: East Midlands

Friden is a hamlet in the civil parish of Hartington Nether Quarter, Derbyshire, England. It is 11 miles (18 km) south-east of Buxton, just off the Newhaven to Cromford Via Gellia road, and lies within the Peak District National Park.

The name "Friden" is derived from the goddess Frig, the wife of Woden. It is on the route of the former Cromford and High Peak Railway, which now forms the High Peak Trail. Friden Grange is a Grade II listed building. It is notable for the manufacture of refractory products at Friden brickworks.

== See also ==
- Listed buildings in Hartington Nether Quarter
- List of places in Derbyshire
