= Hartington Nether Quarter =

Civil parish in Derbyshire, England

Coordinates: 53.14°N 1.77°W

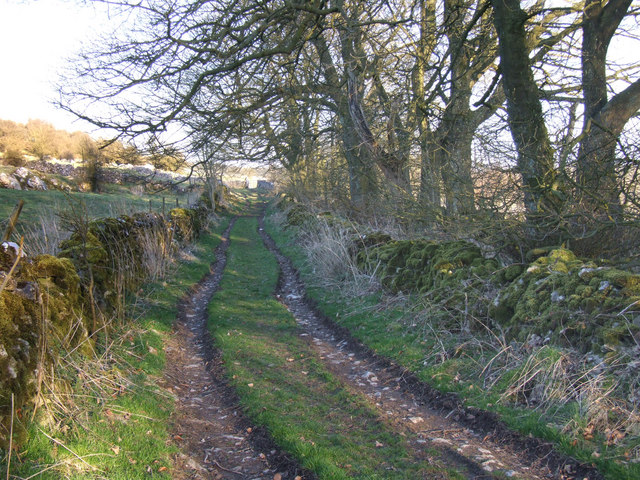
- Near Heathcote.

- Location within Derbyshire
- Population: 434 (2011)
- OS grid reference: SK153601
- District: Derbyshire Dales
- Shire county: Derbyshire
- Region: East Midlands
- Country: England
- Sovereign state: United Kingdom
- Post town: BUXTON
- Postcode district: SK17
- Police: Derbyshire
- Fire: Derbyshire
- Ambulance: East Midlands

Hartington Nether Quarter is a civil parish in the Derbyshire Dales district of Derbyshire, England. The parish was created from the subdivision of the old Hartington parish. According to the 2001 census it had a population of 410, increasing to 434 at the 2011 Census. The parish includes Biggin, Friden, Heathcote, Newhaven and Pikehall.

== See also ==
- Listed buildings in Hartington Nether Quarter
