= Listed buildings in Hartington Nether Quarter =

Hartington Nether Quarter is a civil parish in the Derbyshire Dales district of Derbyshire, England. The parish contains 25 listed buildings that are recorded in the National Heritage List for England. Of these, one is listed at Grade II*, the middle of the three grades, and the others are at Grade II, the lowest grade. The parish is mainly rural, to the east of the village of Hartington, and it contains the settlements of Biggin, Friden, Heathcote, Newhaven and Pikehall. Most of the listed buildings are houses, cottages, farmhouses, and associated structures, and the others are a hotel, a church, a war memorial, and two mileposts.

== Key ==
Grade	Criteria
II*	Particularly important buildings of more than special interest
II	Buildings of national importance and special interest

== Buildings ==
Name and location	Photograph	Date	Notes	Grade
Biggin Hall; 53.13303°N 1.77465°W	—	c. 1642	A house, later a hotel, it is in limestone with gritstone dressings, quoins, and a slate roof with coped gables and moulded kneelers. There are two storeys and attics, a front of two bays, and a stair turret at the rear. The doorway has a massive rusticated quoined surround. The windows are mullioned and most have lights with segmental heads.	II*
Newhaven House Hotel; 53.13759°N 1.75327°W		Mid 18th century	The former hotel, which was extended in about 1795, is in rendered stone on a shallow plinth, with painted dressings, rusticated quoins, decorated bands, and slate roofs, hipped at the front and with coped gables at the rear. There are thee storeys, an east front of five bays, and eight bays on the south front. The right three bays of the south front are canted, to the left is a range of three bays, and a lower range of two bays. On the east front is a central porch with a broken dentilled pediment flanked by porticos with Doric columns. The windows are sashes.	II
Stable, Pikehall Farm; 53.12956°N 1.71500°W	—	Mid 18th century	The stable range is in limestone with gritstone dressings, quoins, and a corrugated asbestos roof with coped gables and kneelers. There are two storeys and an L-shaped plan, with two ranges at right angles, and a later single-storey six-bay range to the east. The openings include two doorways with massive quoins and lintels, stable doors, and casement windows, and in the angle is a flight of external steps.	II
Hilltop Farmhouse; 53.13873°N 1.78234°W		c. 1700	The farmhouse has a timber framed core with cruck construction, it was encased in stone and extended in the 18th century, and a rear wing was added in the 19th century. The house is rendered and has a tile roof. There are two storeys, four bays, and a rear wing. The windows are casements, and in the rear wing are quoins.	II
Biggin Grange and wall 53.12818°N 1.78141°W	—	Late 18th century	The farmhouse, which was extended at the rear in the 19th century, is in limestone with gritstone dressings, quoins, a projecting eaves band, and a slate roof with coped gables and plain kneelers. There are two storeys, an L-shaped plan, and five bays. The central doorway has a quoined surround and a large fanlight, and the windows are sashes, the central window in the upper floor with a keystone. The garden wall has gritstone coping, and contains tall piers with moulded cornices, one with an acorn finial.	II
Cottages west of Highfield House; 53.13073°N 1.76420°W	—	Late 18th century	A pair of cottages in rendered stone with gritstone dressings and a stone slate roof. There are two storeys, and each cottage has a single bay. The right doorway has a quoined surround, and the left doorway has incised jambs with corner circles, and a flat hood. There is one sash window, and the other windows are mullioned with two lights, and contain casements.	II
Pikehall Farmhouse; 53.12918°N 1.71443°W	—	Late 18th century	The farmhouse is in limestone with gritstone dressings, quoins, and a stone slate roof with coped gables and moulded kneelers. There are two storeys and three bays. The doorway has a rusticated quoined surround, and the windows either have a single light, or are mullioned and contain two casements.	II
Smithy Farmhouse and Blacksmiths; 53.13166°N 1.75612°W	—	Late 18th century	A farmhouse and smithy in limestone with gritstone dressings, quoins, and a slate roof with coped gables and plain kneelers. The farmhouse has two storeys and three bays, and the smithy to the east has a single storey and two bays. The doorways have plain surrounds and the windows are mullioned.	II
Upperhouse Farmhouse; 53.12993°N 1.72609°W	—	1779	The farmhouse is in limestone with gritstone dressings, quoins and a slate roof. There are two storeys and three bays. On the front are two doorways with quoined surrounds, one with a dated quoin, and the windows are mullioned and contain casements.	II
Newhaven House Farmhouse; 53.13780°N 1.75331°W	—	c. 1795	An outbuilding, later a farmhouse, in stone with gritstone dressings, quoins, a string course, a hipped slate roof, and two storeys. The doorways have quoined surrounds, one has a rectangular fanlight, and the windows are top-hung casements.	II
Stable block and coach house northwest of Newhaven House Hotel; 53.13776°N 1.75369°W	—	c. 1795	The buildings are in rendered limestone with gritstone dressings, quoins, and a hipped slate roof. There are two storeys and five bays, the middle bay projecting under a coped gable. This bay contains a semicircular archway, blocked above the impost level, and is flanked by doorways with quoined surround. Elsewhere, there are more doorways with quoined surrounds, hayloft doors, and a single-light window.	II
Stable block north of Newhaven House Hotel; 53.13795°N 1.75349°W	—	c. 1795	The stable block is in rendered limestone with gritstone dressings, quoins, and a corrugated iron roof. There are two storeys and four bays, and a brick lean-to on the east end. The building contains doorways with quoined surrounds, a single-light window, and hayloft openings	II
Station House; 53.14384°N 1.74626°W	—	c. 1825	The house is in limestone with gritstone dressings, rusticated quoins, an eaves band, and a slate roof. There are two storeys and three bays. In the centre is a porch, above it is a single-light window, and the other windows are mullioned with hood moulds.	II
Bank House; 53.12600°N 1.75356°W		Early 19th century	A farmhouse, at one time a coaching inn, it is in rendered stone with gritstone dressings, quoins, a plain eaves band, and a hipped tile roof. There are three storeys and three bays. In the centre is a limestone porch with a coped gable, and a ball and steeple finial. On the front is a sash window, above which is an armorial shield inscribed with initials and a date. The other windows on the front are also sashes, and on the south front are two-light mullioned windows.	II
Friden Grange; 53.14382°N 1.74891°W	—	Early 19th century	A farmhouse in limestone with painted stone dressings and a stone slate roof. There are three bays, the middle bay projecting, with two storeys and an attic, and the outer bays have two storeys. The recessed doorway has a fanlight and a bracketed hood. The windows vary; some are mullioned, there are sash windows, some have single lights, and some have hood moulds.	II
Hand Dale Farmhouse; 53.14730°N 1.77970°W		Early 19th century	The farmhouse is in limestone with gritstone dressings, quoins, a plain eaves band, and a stone slate roof with coped gables and plain kneelers. There are two storeys and two bays. The doorway has a quoined surround, and the windows are mullioned with two-lights and top-hung casements.	II
Heathcote Farm; 53.13909°N 1.78311°W	—	Early 19th century	A farmhouse in limestone, partly rendered, with gritstone dressings, quoins, and a stone slate roof with coped gables and plain kneelers. There are two storeys and two bays. In the centre is a lean-to porch, over which is an oval plaque, and the windows are replacement casements.	II
Ivy House; 53.13177°N 1.75445°W		Early 19th century	A limestone farmhouse with gritstone dressings, quoins, an eaves cornice, and a pyramidal hipped slate roof. There are two storeys and three bays, and a single-storey two-bay wing on the left. In the centre of the main block is a porch with four pilasters around panels, and a round-headed doorway with a divided fanlight and a cornice. The windows are sashes.	II
Barns and stables, Ivy House Farm; 53.13170°N 1.75388°W	—	Early 19th century	The barns and stables are in limestone with gritstone dressings, quoins, and a hipped slate roof with some asbestos sheeting. There are two storeys, and the buildings form a U-shaped plan. The openings include doorways with quoined surrounds, some of which are blocked, and hayloft doors, and there is a flight of external steps.	II
Yew Tree Cottage; 53.13251°N 1.77465°W	—	Early 19th century	A limestone house with gritstone dressings, quoins, and a slate roof with moulded gable copings and kneelers. There are two storeys and two bays. The doorway has a plain surround, and the windows are mullioned with moulded surrounds, and contain two casements.	II
St Thomas' Church, Biggin; 53.13112°N 1.77082°W		1844–48	The church, designed by E. H. Shellard in Decorated style, is in limestone with gritstone dressings and a slate roof. It consists of a nave, a south porch, a chancel, and a west tower. The tower has three stages, a high plinth, and a southeast stair turret with a four-centred arched doorway. The bottom stage contains a west doorway with a moulded surround and a pointed arch, above which is a mullioned and transomed window with a hood mould. In the middle stage are flat-headed windows, and clock faces on the north and south fronts, and over them is a chamfered string course. The top stage has bell openings, above which is a moulded string course with gargoyles, and embattled parapets.	II
Farm building northwest of Hilltop Farmhouse; 53.13887°N 1.78246°W		Mid 19th century	A barn and stables at right angles, in stone with sandstone dressings, quoins, and a tile roof with coped gables and kneelers. Most openings have long and short surrounds. There are two flights of external steps, and in the rear wall are two tiers of vents.	II
Milepost south of Mount Pleasant Farm; 53.12041°N 1.75255°W		Mid 19th century	The milepost on the west side of the A515 road is in cast iron. It has a triangular section, curving to a flat back with a segmental head. On the top are the distances to London and Derby, on the curving face is "HARTINGTON PARISH", and on the side faces are the distances to Ashbourne and Buxton, and details of the manufacturer.	II
Milepost south of Newhaven House Hotel; 53.13474°N 1.75400°W		Mid 19th century	The milepost on the west side of the A515 road is in cast iron. It has a triangular section, curving to a flat back with a segmental head. On the top are the distances to London and Derby, on the curving face is "HARTINGTON PARISH", and on the side faces are the distances to Ashbourne and Buxton, and details of the manufacturer.	II
Biggin-by-Hartington War Memorial; 53.13107°N 1.76996°W		1921	The war memorial is in a small garden by a road junction. It is in pink granite, and consists of an obelisk on a pedestal with a bevelled top, on a plinth with a chamfered edge. The base is in rough-hewn granite. On the obelisk is an inscription, and on the pedestal are the names of those lost in the two World Wars.	II
