= Samuel Gibson =

British botanist (1790–1849)

Samuel Gibson (1790 – 1849) was a British botanist. Described as an "artisan botanist", Gibson had little formal education, but was an associate of Henry Baines and assisted Baines with his 1840 work Flora of Yorkshire.
