= The Lancashire Hotpots =

Comedy folk band

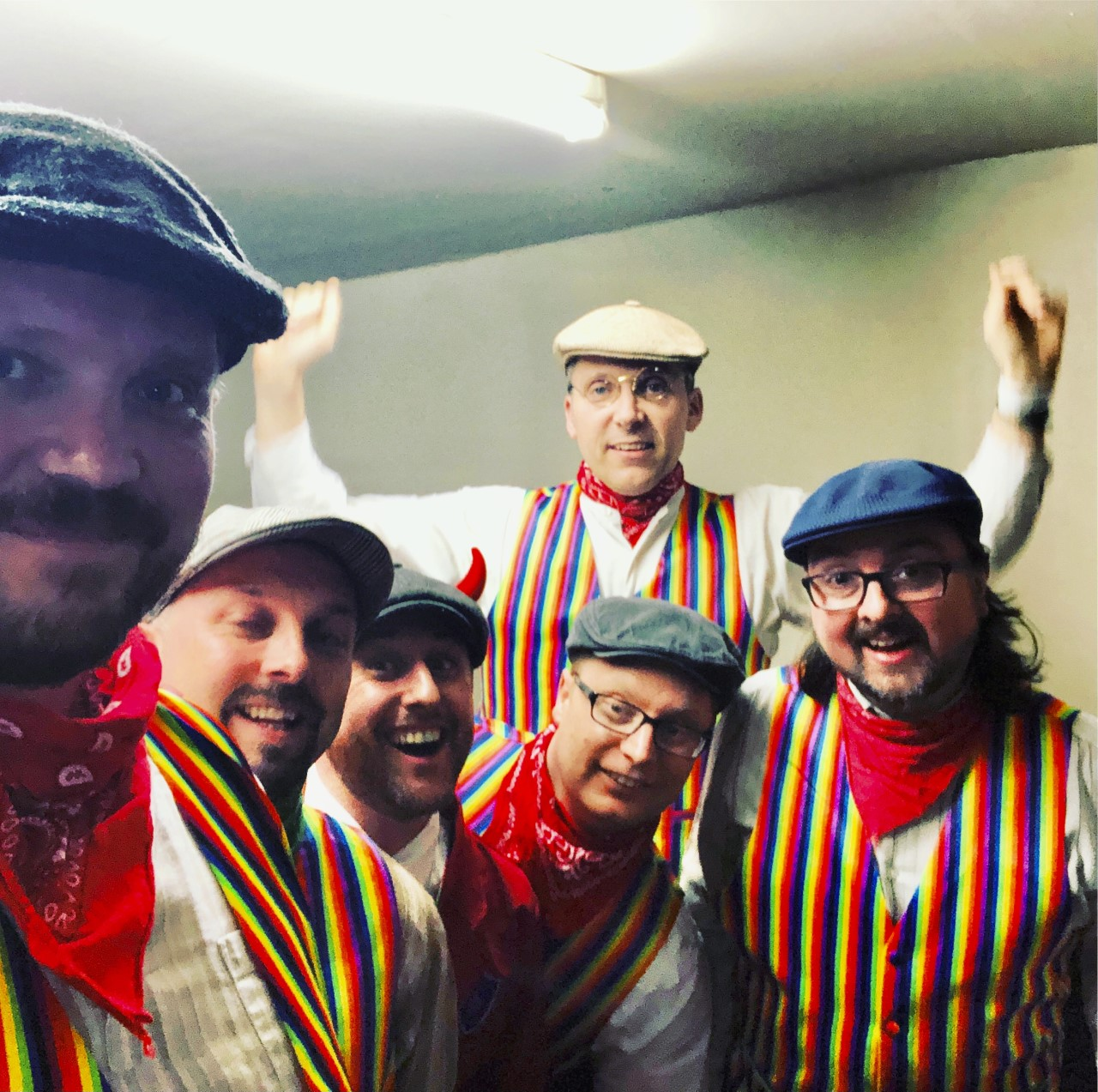

Background information
- Origin: St Helens, Merseyside, England
- Genres: Comedy, folk
- Years active: 2006–present
- Label: Fuss Records
- Members: Bernard Thresher; Dickie Ticker; Bob Wriggles; Kenny Body; Billy McCartney
- Past members: Willie Eckerslike; Ron Seal
- Website: The Lancashire Hotpots

The Lancashire Hotpots are a comedy folk band from St Helens, (historically part of Lancashire), England, formed in 2006. The group perform and record songs about Lancashire, technology and British culture, such as "He's Turned Emo", "Chippy Tea" and "eBay Eck".

The group's songs make use of Lancashire dialect. Their first single, "He's Turned Emo", gained over 230,000 plays on MySpace in March 2008, and was featured on BBC Radio One by Colin Murray. Their debut album, Never Mind The Hotpots, was a minor hit, becoming the number one comedy album on iTunes in UK, and number two in the BBC Radio 6 Music Album Charts.

The current members are Bernard Thresher (vocals, guitar, ukulele, drums), Dickie Ticker (bell tree, mandolin, melodica, hand percussion), Bob Wriggles (bass guitar, synth bass), Billy McCartney (keyboards), Kenny Body (drums), and Ron Seal (lead guitar). McCartney and Body joined following the death in May 2010 of founder member Willie Eckerslike (real name Tom McGrath), (drums, vocals), while Seal joined in 2016.

== History ==
Thresher and Wriggles met while working at Knowsley Safari Park and subsequently formed their first rock band together, Korova. Whilst working at St Helens College, Wriggles met Dickie Ticker who was producing electronic music and light-hearted remixes under the name 'Diffusion'. The three became interested in working together and, after Korova disbanded, Thresher and Wriggles joined forces with Ticker to create electronic dance music under the new name Emmet.

They first dabbled with comedy music producing a remix of the Coldplay song "Clocks" for Radio One DJ Chris Moyles in the style of the German dance group Scooter. In a play on words they named the side project Moped. The track proved popular with listeners of the show and they went on to produce several more remixes as well as playing live in clubs around the country. On the request of Moyles, they produced a remix of songs by Norman Cook a.k.a. Fatboy Slim in order to perform them at an outside broadcast in a pub in Brighton. Cook was a guest on the show and Moped performed the remix live on the show for him. Whilst being interviewed on the show he said he 'felt as though his whole life had flashed before him.'

Ticker then had the idea of a folk band who write songs and tell stories about modern life: not about orchards and craft fairs but online dating and modern technology. Originally intended to be called the Bolton Weavers (after folk band the Houghton Weavers), the band was instead named the Lancashire Hotpots. They made their first recordings in Thresher's front room in Coventry, after an Emmet gig at a comic convention in Birmingham, where they had played to an empty room.

McCartney was in Liverpool band Lyons and Tigers which supported the Hotpots numerous times around the North West of England. Body was in several St Helens-based bands including Jessica's Ghost, The Ups and Giant Root Attack. Both were enlisted to play in the band following death of original drummer, Willie Eckerslike. Incidentally, Kenny Body briefly appeared as an audience member in their "Carry You Home" video.

The group's songs make use of Lancashire dialect. Their first single, "He's Turned Emo", gained over 230,000 plays on MySpace in March 2008, and was featured on BBC Radio One by Colin Murray. Their debut album, Never Mind The Hotpots, was a minor hit, becoming the number one comedy album on iTunes in UK, and number two in the BBC Radio 6 Music Album Charts. The current members are Bernard Thresher (vocals, guitar, ukulele, drums), Dickie Ticker (bell tree, mandolin, melodica, hand percussion), Bob Wriggles (bass guitar, synth bass), Billy McCartney (keyboards), Kenny Body (drums), and Ron Seal (lead guitar). McCartney and Body joined following the death in May 2010 of founder member Willie Eckerslike (real name Tom McGrath), (drums, vocals), while Seal joined in 2016.

The group's album titles and covers parody well known albums by various groups, including Never Mind the Bollocks, Here's the Sex Pistols by the Sex Pistols, Pet Sounds by the Beach Boys, Achtung Baby by U2, A Hard Day's Night by the Beatles, Lust for Life by Iggy Pop and Greatest Hits by Queen. Musical influences include the Oldham Tinkers, George Formby, hip hop and John Cooper Clarke, as well as the Houghton Weavers.

== Festivals ==
As well as touring nationwide, the band play at major music festivals playing events such as Glastonbury Festival, Kendal Calling, Y Not Festival, CarFest and Beat-Herder Festival.

== Television ==
Television appearances for the group have included a performance of their song "Dibnah", live on BBC2's Too Much TV, in March 2016.

== Olympic controversy ==
The group were contacted by the International Olympic Committee in August 2016 over their 2008 song "The Beer Olympics". The IOC claimed trademark rights over the word Olympics stating that Hotpots' use of the word was a breach of their trademark. To avoid further problems, the band subsequently retitled the song "The Beer International Non-Profit, Non-Governmental Sporting Quad Yearly Event".

== Discography ==
=== Albums ===
- Never Mind the Hotpots (2007)
- Pot Sounds (2008)
- The Lancashire Hotpots' Christmas Cracker (2009)
- Criminal Record (2010)
- Achtung Gravy (2011)
- A Hard Day's Pint (2012)
- Crust for Life (2013)
- Golden Crates (2014)
- A Fistful of Scratchcards (2015)
- Now't Like the 80's (2016)
- Sing-A-Longa Knees Up Jamboree (2018)
- The Lancashire Hotpots Save Christmas! (2020)

=== Live albums ===
- Never Mind the Hotpots – Live at the Citadel (2007)
- Live at the Manchester Academy (2017)

=== DVDs ===
- Never Mind the Hotpots – Live at the Citadel (2008)
- Live at the Lowry (2014)
- Live at the Manchester Academy (2017)

=== Singles ===
- "He's Turned Emo" (2007)
- "Chav" (2008)
- The Beer Olympics (EP) (2009)
- "Carry You Home" / "Chippy Tea" (2009)
- "You Could Get Hit by a Bus Tomorrow" (2011)
- "The Beer Olympics 2012" (2012)
- "The Beer Festival" (2012)
- "The Baking Song" (2013)
- "The Flappy Bird Song" (2014)
- "Mum's for Tea" (2014)
- "Cheer Up Thom Yorke" (2015)
- "Lancashire's for Me" / "Black Friday" (2015)
- "Dibnah" (2016)
- "Has the Bin Man Bin Mon?" (2018)
- "The Austerity Blues" (2018)
- "Lean Forwards, Lean Backwards" (2019)
- "Egg, Sausage, Chips and Beans (Ricardo Autobahn Mix)" (2020)
- "O'reet Owdoo Sithee Latter Cocker" (2021)
- "Gravy" (2021)
- "Breakfast Dinner Tea" (2022)
- "Non Competitive Football Song" (2022)
- "A Lancashire DJ (Ricardo Autobahn Remix)" (2023)
