= Christopher Fulwood =

English royalist

Christopher Fulwood (1590?–1643), was an English royalist.

Fulwood, probably born in London around 1590, was the eldest son of Sir George Fulwood, lord of the manor of Middleton-by-Youlgrave, Derbyshire. His father, who died in 1624, was admitted a member of Gray's Inn in 1589, and appears to have passed the greater part of his life in the practice of the law in London, as in 1608 he is styled of Fulwood Street, Holborn. In 1605 Christopher was also entered at Gray's Inn, of which society he was admitted ancient 28 May 1622, appointed autumn reader in 1628, and treasurer 3 November 1637. When disengaged from his professional duties he resided at Middleton. His strict impartiality as a magistrate is commemorated by the 'apostle of the Peak,’ William Bagshaw. In 1640, at the Bakewell sessions, the curate of Taddington was charged with puritanism. Fulwood, who was chairman, 'though known to be a zealot in the cause of the then king and conformity, released him, and gave his accusers a sharp reprimand'.

== Civil War and death ==
Fulwood's influence in the district was of great value to the royalist cause. He was specially employed to raise the Derbyshire miners as a life-guard for King Charles I in 1642, when the lord-lieutenant of the county, the Earl of Rutland, declined to appear in the service. He was soon at the head of a regiment of eleven hundred men, who were mustered on Tideswell Moor. His success appears to have alarmed the leaders of the parliamentarians in the neighbourhood, who, according to the local tradition, soon found an opportunity of seizing Fulwood while at his house at Middleton. The chief enemy of the king in the district was Sir John Gell of Hopton, and it was by Gell's emissaries that Fulwood was captured. It is said that while in his house he received notice of the near approach of the hostile detachment, and hid himself in a fissure separating an outlying mass of rock from its parent cliff, in the dale of the Bradford, a few hundred yards in the rear of the mansion.

His pursuers saw him, and a shot from them inflicted a mortal wound. He was carried off towards Lichfield, a garrison town which had been taken by Gell on the preceding 5 March, but died on the way at Calton in Staffordshire, 16 November 1643. The rock is still pointed out at Middleton. Before the close of 1644 the property had passed out of the hands of the family. Fulwood's two daughters, Elizabeth and Mary, sought refuge among their friends in London, where they died in obscurity. The mansion at Middleton began to be demolished about 1720.
