= Change4Life =

Public health programme in England

Change4Life is a public health programme in England which began in January 2009, run by Public Health England. It was the country's first national social marketing campaign to tackle the causes of obesity.

In 2021, it was brought under the "Better Health" brand

Change4Life aimed to help families make small, sustainable yet significant improvements to their diet and activity levels. It uses the slogan "more kids, less food, eat less, move more, live longer".

Change4Life encouraged families to adopt seven healthy behaviours:

- 5 A Day – suggestions for ways to eat the recommended 5 portions of fruit and veg each day
- 400, 600, 600 - advice on watching calorie intake at breakfast (400 calories), lunch, and dinner (600 calories each)
- Watch the salt – advice on reducing the amount of salt eaten each day, ideally keeping it to below 6g for adults
- Cut back fat – information about the (mainly saturated) fat found in foods and ways to reduce this
- Sugar swaps – information about sugar found in foods and suggestions for healthier alternatives
- 100 Calorie Snacks, 2 A Day Max
- Get going every day – the importance of leading an active lifestyle and ways for adults and children to do this cheaply and easily

== Marketing approach ==
Change4Life adopted an integrated marketing approach and uses a variety of marketing channels including television and radio, digital, social media, PR and direct marketing. It used an animated television advertising by Aardman Animations, as part of a wider campaign. M&C Saatchi lead on the creative aspects of the campaign with additional input from a range of other agencies providing PR, digital, planning and data services. Collectively, the campaign delivered a return of £2.98 for every £1 spent.

== Advertising ==
On Channel 4, Change4Life was a previous sponsor of The Simpsons. The sponsor of Change4Life with Simpsons happened from Monday, 5 October to Christmas Day 2009.

In 2013, Change4Life joined with ITV as well as food manufacturing companies such as Quorn and Asda to launch an "ad takeover" during primetime tv. This meant an ad break where all the advertisements were explicitly health-focused.

Change4Life also made a TV advert in 2019.

== Local supporters ==
In addition to consumer marketing, Change4Life engaged with intermediaries at a local level, including schools, NHS organisations, local authorities and others. These local supporters were able to interact with the campaign audience in different ways and in different contexts to Change4Life's central approach. Free resources including posters and leaflets were available to local supporters to enable them to do this effectively.

== Change4Life Sports Clubs ==
Change4Life Sports Clubs were designed by Change4Life in 2011 to increase physical activity levels in less active children in primary and secondary schools by:

- Using multi-sport themes (primary) or alternative school sports (secondary)
- Using the inspiration of the Olympic and Paralympic Games (which were held in 2012)
- Responding to what children want
- Establishing a habit of regular participation
- Developing a real sense of belonging
- Changing behaviours relating to key health outcomes (including healthy eating, physical activity and emotional health)

The Change4Life Sports Clubs programme is funded by the Department of Health and managed by the Youth Sport Trust.

== Start4Life ==
Start4Life is a sister brand of Change4Life. It is aimed primarily at pregnant women and new mothers. It encourages a healthy lifestyle during pregnancy (activity, healthy eating, taking supplements, quitting smoking, and avoiding alcohol) as well as a healthy start for new babies (breastfeeding, introducing solid foods, avoiding sugary foods, and activity).

It also encourages fathers, friends and family members to support pregnant women and new mothers in making healthy lifestyle choices. Free leaflets and posters are available to healthcare professionals to help them encourage their patients to make healthy lifestyle choices.

The Start4Life brand has been continued as Start For Life under the main Better Families brand.

== See also ==
- Obesity in the United Kingdom
