= Biggin (Dovedale and Parwich Ward) =

Village in Derbyshire, England

Coordinates: 53.131°N 1.770°W

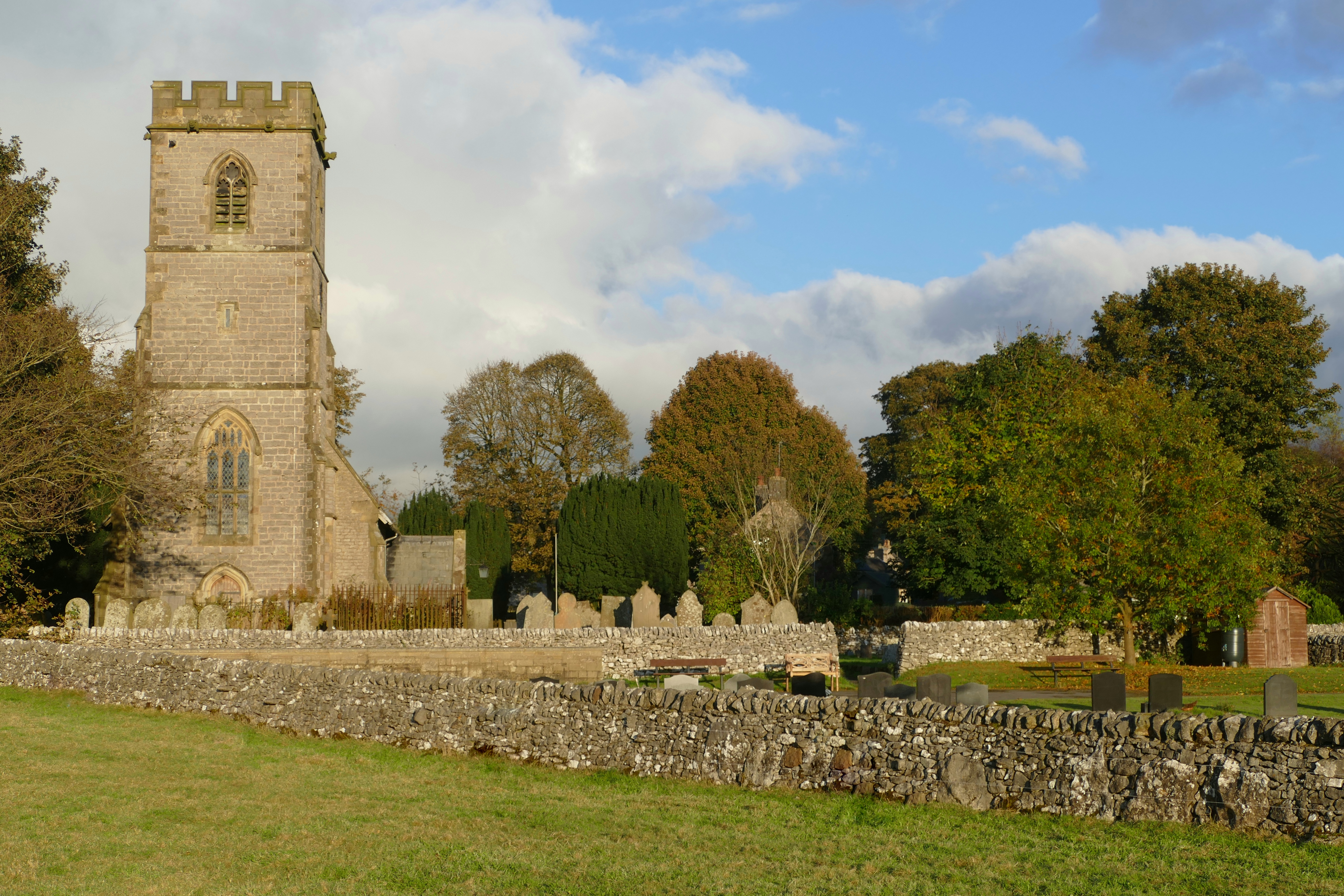
- St Thomas' Church in Biggin

- Location within Derbyshire
- Population: 136
- OS grid reference: SK154593
- District: Derbyshire Dales
- Shire county: Derbyshire
- Region: East Midlands
- Country: England
- Sovereign state: United Kingdom
- Post town: BUXTON
- Postcode district: SK17
- Dialling code: 01298
- Police: Derbyshire
- Fire: Derbyshire
- Ambulance: East Midlands
- UK Parliament: Derbyshire Dales

Biggin is a village in the Derbyshire Dales district of Derbyshire, England. It is part of the Hartington Nether Quarter parish, and is in the Peak District National Park.

It is just off the A515 road between Ashbourne and Buxton. National Cycle Network routes 68 and 548 pass through the village.

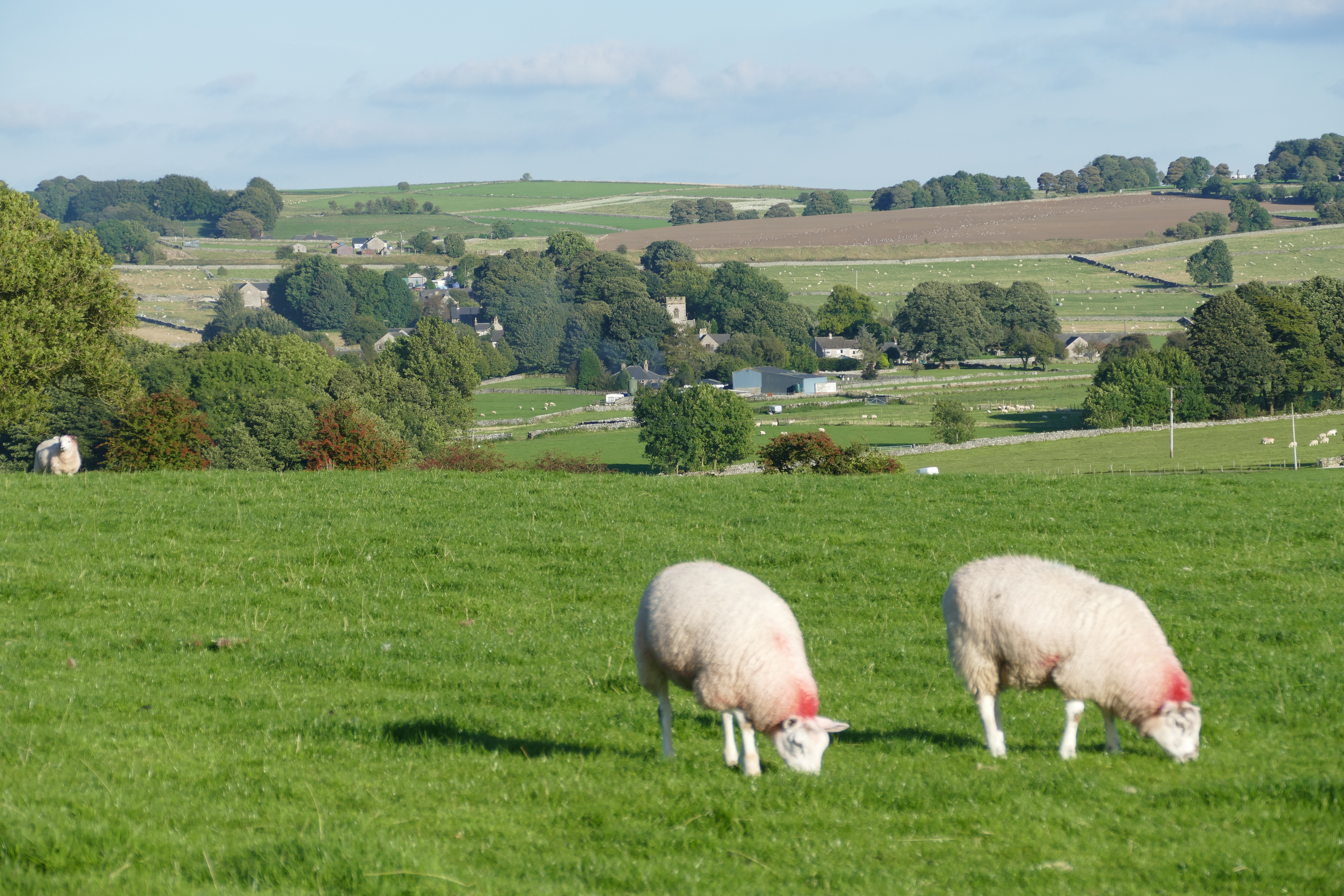
Overlooking Biggin

Biggin was once known as Newbiggin, when it had a monastic settlement of the Cistercian order, established by the monks of Garendon Abbey, Leicestershire. The monks established a sheep ranch at Biggin Grange, which still has one ancient outbuilding. Farming is still important to the village, though at one time (18th century) it was also a centre of lead mining. When the lead started to be worked out, there was a migration of lead miners to Upper Teesdale, and they probably took the name Newbiggin there. Today tourism is an important industry alongside farming.

== See also ==
- Listed buildings in Hartington Nether Quarter
- Dovedale
- Tissington Trail
