= Arbor Low =

Neolithic henge in Derbyshire, England

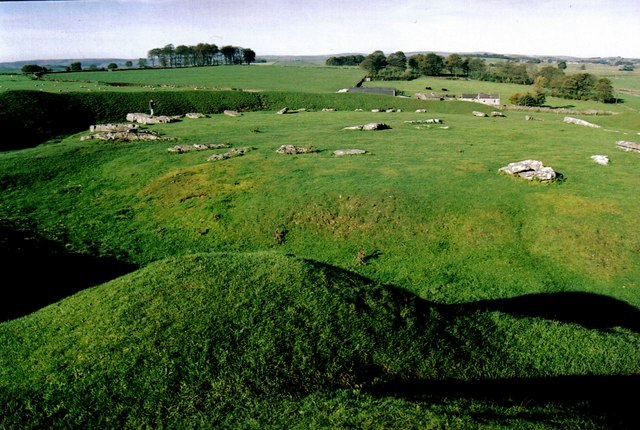
- Interactive map of Arbor Low
- 53°10′08″N 01°45′42″W
- Type: Henge monument
- Location: near Middleton-by-Youlgreave and Bakewell
- Region: Derbyshire, England

Scheduled monument
- Official name: Arbor Low henge, large irregular stone circle, linear bank and bowl barrow
- Designated: 18 August 1882
- Reference no.: 1011087

Arbor Low is a well-preserved Neolithic henge in the Derbyshire Peak District, England. It lies on a Carboniferous Limestone plateau known as the White Peak area. The monument consists of a stone circle surrounded by earthworks and a ditch.

== Description ==
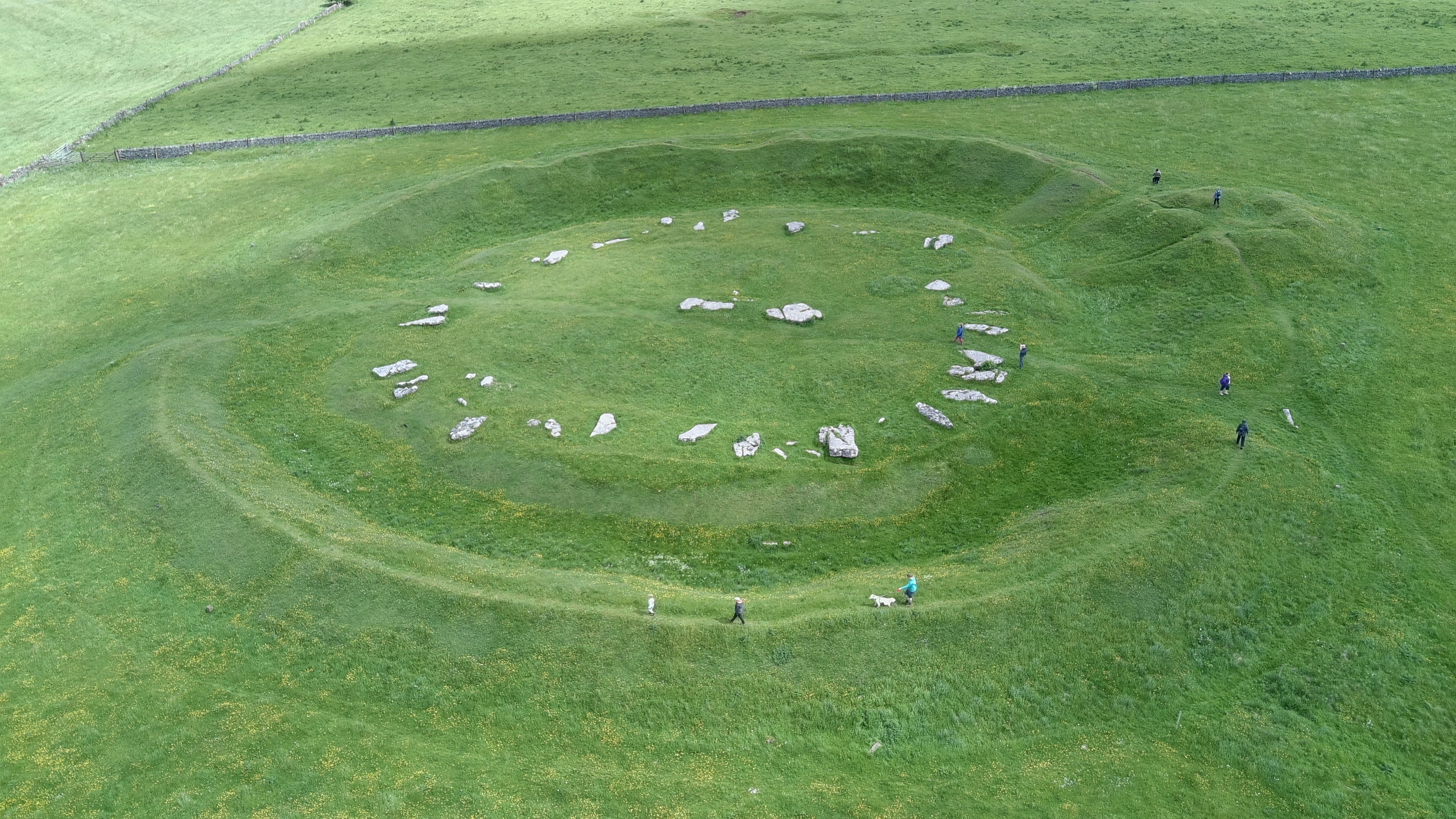
Arbor Low Henge

The monument includes about 50 large limestone blocks, quarried from a local site, which form an egg-shaped circle. There were probably 41–43 stones originally, but some are now in fragments. They range in size from 1.6 to 2.1 metres (5 ft 3 in to 6 ft 11 in), with monoliths of between 2.6 and 2.9 metres (8 ft 6 in and 9 ft 6 in). One stone is partially upright; the rest are lying flat. Although it is often stated that the stones have never stood upright, it is possible that they had originally been set upright in shallow stone holes.

In the centre of the circle lie at least six smaller blocks known as the cove, originally believed to have been set in a rectangle.

The stones are surrounded by an earth bank, approximately 90 by 85 metres (295 by 279 ft) at the outside edges and 2 metres (6 ft 7 in) high, with an interior ditch about 2 metres deep and 7 to 10 metres (23 to 33 ft) wide. There are two causeway entrances breaching both the bank and ditch; a north-west entrance 9 metres (30 ft) wide, and a south-east entrance 6 metres (20 ft) wide. The inner bank encloses an area of 52 by 40 metres (171 by 131 ft).

Few henge monuments in the British Isles are as well preserved.

== Finds ==
Human skeletal remains were discovered close to the cove during excavations between 1901 and 1902. Other finds have included flint scrapers, arrowheads, and bone and antler tools.

== Surrounding landscape ==
A large Bronze Age round cairn or barrow was built later, to the east of the henge, using material taken from the earth bank. It was excavated in 1845 and found to contain a cremation burial, flint and bone artefacts, and two pots similar to Late Neolithic Peterborough ware now in the care of Weston Park Museum.

Arbor Low is part of a larger complex, and is linked by an earth ridge to the earlier Neolithic oval barrow of Gib Hill 320m away.

== Construction and usage ==
The bank and ditch of the henge, as well as its two entrances, were probably established in the Late Neolithic period, with the stones added later, sometime before 2000 BCE. The site seems to have been in use until the Bronze Age, when the outer bank was reconstructed so that the round barrow could be erected. Both the earthworks and the stoneworks are probably later than the nearby Gib Hill.

== Statutory protection ==
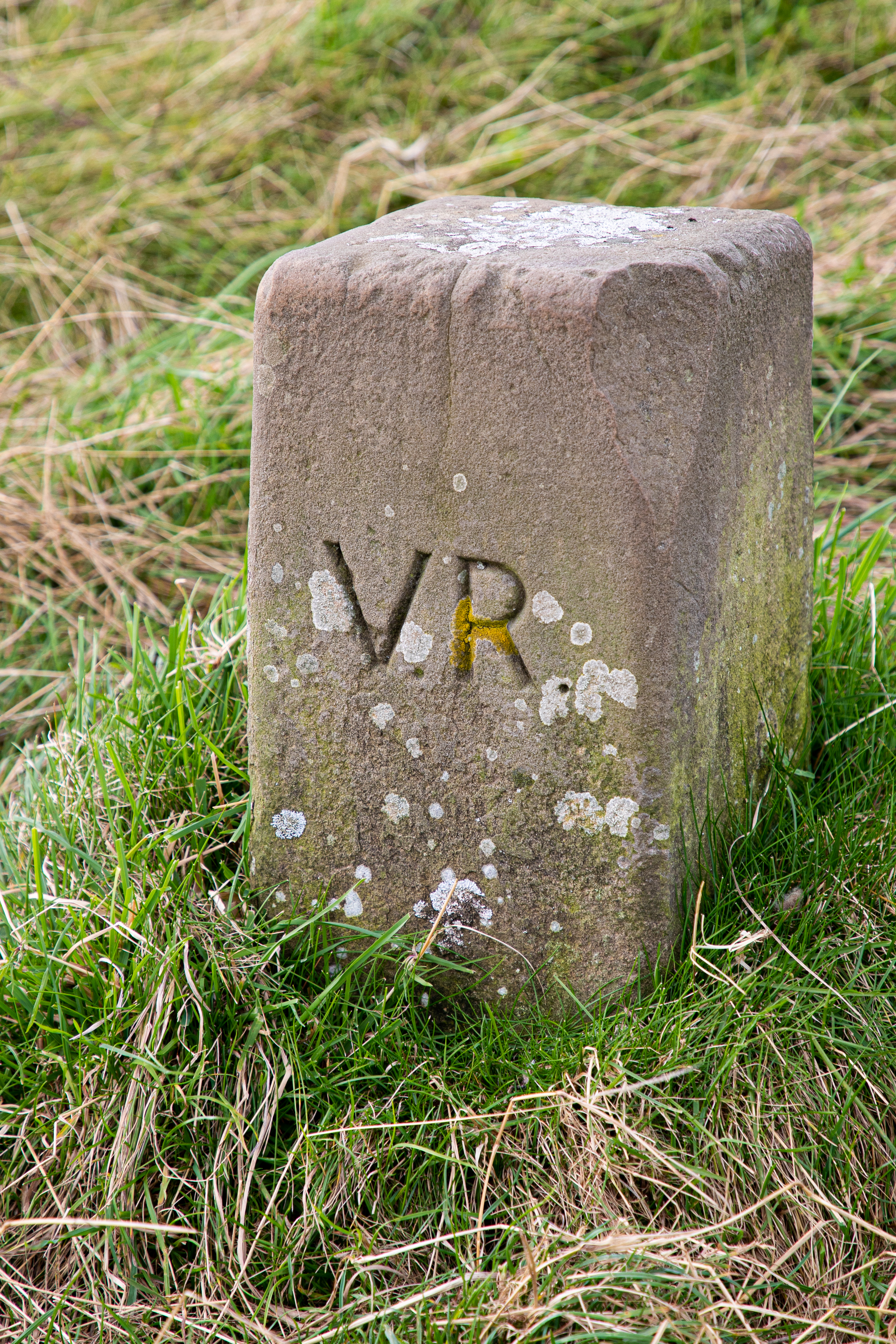
One of the VR markers, indicating the Victorian area of statutory protection

Arbor Low was one of the first ancient monuments to be given statutory protection, on 18 August 1882. Small stone markers engraved VR and GR (for Victoria Regina and Georgius Rex) still stand around the henge, demarcating the protected area. One of the VR stones, having been damaged, has been replaced by one bearing CR (Charles Rex).

== Access ==
The henge stands on private farmland, and a small fee is charged for access.

== See also ==
- The Bull Ring
