= Middleton-by-Youlgreave =

Village in Derbyshire, England

Coordinates: 53.165°N 1.709°W

Middleton
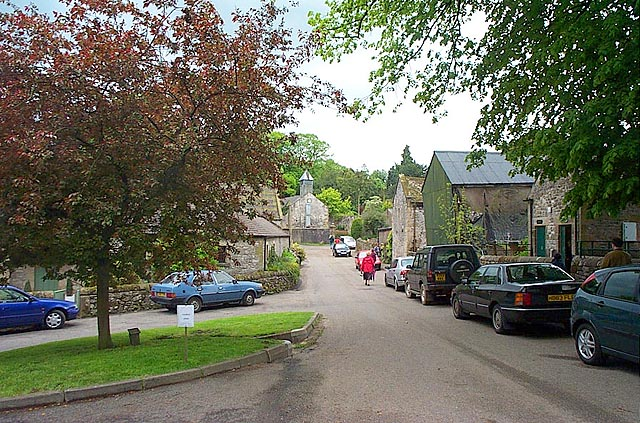
- in 2003

- Location within Derbyshire
- Population: 137 (2011)
- OS grid reference: SK195631
- Civil parish: Middleton and Smerrill
- District: Derbyshire Dales
- Shire county: Derbyshire
- Region: East Midlands
- Country: England
- Sovereign state: United Kingdom
- Post town: BAKEWELL
- Postcode district: DE45
- Dialling code: 01629
- Police: Derbyshire
- Fire: Derbyshire
- Ambulance: East Midlands
- UK Parliament: Derbyshire Dales

Middleton, often known as Middleton-by-Youlgreave or Middleton-by-Youlgrave to distinguish it from nearby Middleton-by-Wirksworth, is a village in the Peak District, Derbyshire, England. The appropriate civil parish is called Middleton and Smerrill. The population of this parish was 137 at the 2011 Census. It lies south west of Youlgreave, above the River Bradford. Its main industries are farming and tourism.

== History ==
This manor was mentioned in the Domesday Book as belonging to Henry de Ferrers; it included a mill and was worth sixteen shillings.

The village grew during the Middle Ages. Middleton Castle, a fortified manor house, was built in the early seventeenth century, and saw some fighting during the English Civil War. Christopher Fulwood attempted to raise a Royalist force from his base in the Castle, but on 16 November 1643, Roundhead troops raided the house and killed him. The Castle now lies in ruins.

The settlement's present appearance dates from the early nineteenth century. Thomas Bateman rebuilt most of the village in the 1820s, incorporating the mullioned windows of earlier buildings to retain something of its traditional appearance. Bateman rebuilt Middleton Hall as his own residence, and the small parish church dates from some fifty years later.

His grandson, also named Thomas Bateman, grew up at Middleton Hall, and began his life-long interest in archaeology. Arbor Low, a significant Neolithic barrow, lies two miles west of the village. The younger Thomas built Lomberdale Hall as his residence.

An annual well dressing takes place in Middleton. Every summer the village hosts a musical festival, showcasing local musicians.

== See also ==
- Listed buildings in Middleton and Smerrill
