= Ten Tonnes =

English singer-songwriter

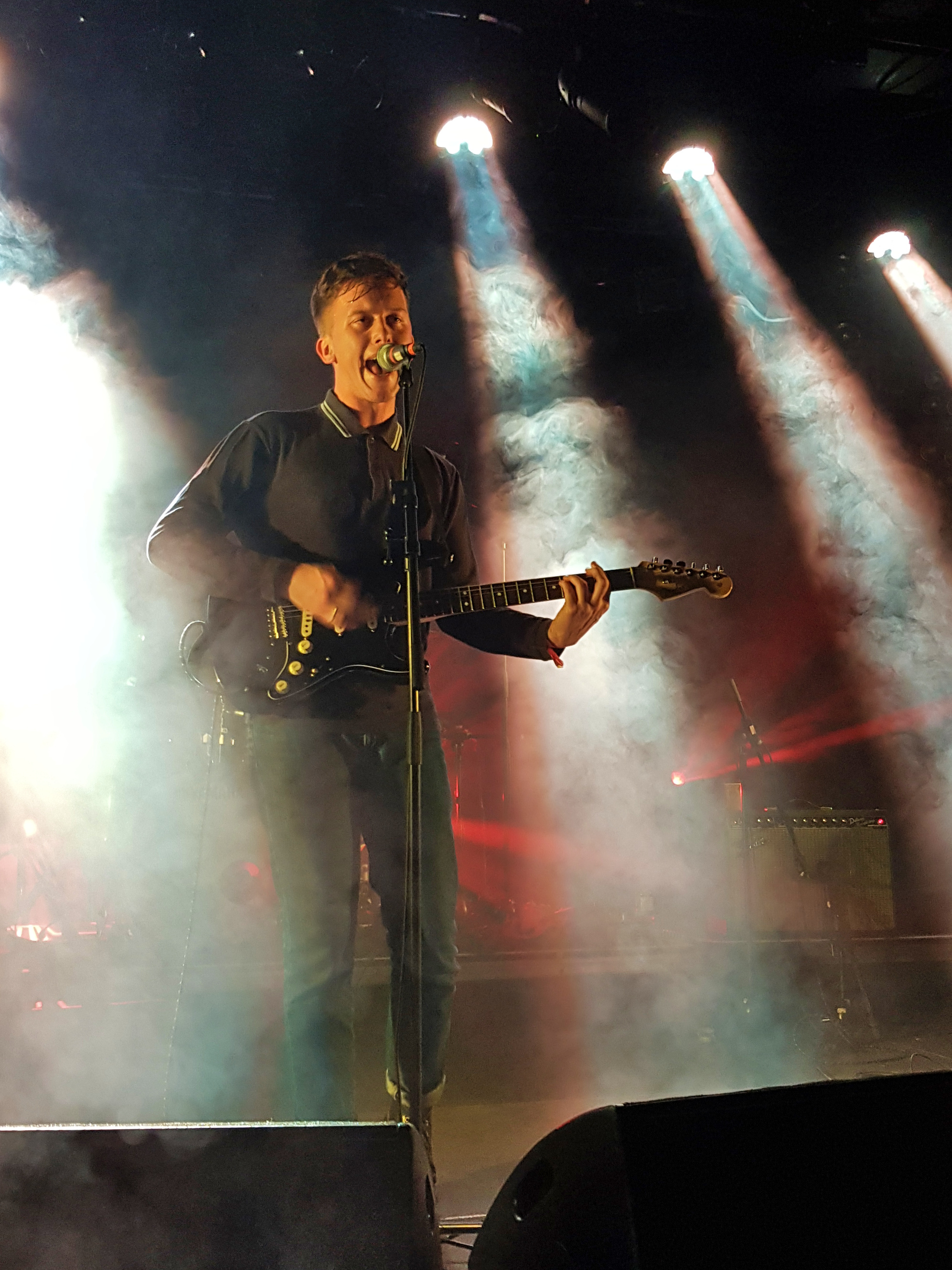
- Ten Tonnes performing in Vienna, 2018

Background information
- Born: Ethan James Barnett; 23 August 1996 (age 29); Hertford, Hertfordshire, England
- Genres: Indie rock; rock; pop
- Occupations: Singer; songwriter; musician
- Instruments: Vocals; guitar
- Years active: 2016–present
- Label: Warner Bros. Records
- Website: tentonnes.com

Ethan James Barnett (born 23 August 1996), best known by his stage name Ten Tonnes, is an English singer-songwriter and musician. After releasing two EPs, Lucy (2016) and Born to Lose (2017), he released his eponymous debut studio album, Ten Tonnes, through Warner Bros. Records on 3 May 2019, and scored a top 40 position in the UK upon release.

In 2021, he released his EP, So Long, which features the single "Everything You Got". His second studio album, Dancing, Alone, was released on 28 July 2023. On 3 February 2025, he announced that his fifth EP, Heaven Sent, would be his last release as Ten Tonnes.

== Discography ==
=== Studio albums ===
List of studio albums, with selected details and chart positions
Title	Details	Official Album Sales Charts	Official Independent Albums Chart
Title	Details	UK	UK
Ten Tonnes	Released: 3 May 2019; Label: Warner Bros.; Format: CD, digital download, vinyl	31	–
Dancing, Alone	Released: 28 July 2023; Label: Silver Heat Records; Format: CD, digital download, vinyl	61	19

=== Extended plays ===
List of extended plays, with selected details
Title	Details
Lucy	Released: 24 March 2016; Label: Self-released; Format: Digital download
Born to Lose	Released: 9 June 2017; Label: Warner Bros. Records; Format: Digital download
Acoustic	Released: 15 December 2017; Label: Warner Bros. Records; Format: Digital download
So Long	Released: 30 June 2021; Label: Silver Heat Records; Format: Digital download
Heaven Sent	Released: 16 May 2025; Label: Silver Heat Records; Format: Digital download

=== Singles ===
List of singles as lead artist, showing year released and album name
Title	Year	Album
"Subtle Changes"	2016	Non-album single
"Silver Heat"	2017	Born to Lose – EP
"Cracks Between"	2017	Ten Tonnes
"Lay It On Me"	2018	Ten Tonnes
"G.I.V.E."	2018	Ten Tonnes
"Better Than Me"	2018	Ten Tonnes
"Lucy"	2019	Ten Tonnes
"Girl Are You Lonely Like Me?"	2020	So Long – EP
"Everything You Got"	2021	So Long – EP
"Monday Morning"	2023	Dancing, Alone
"Dancing, Alone"	2023	Dancing, Alone
"Lone Star"	2023	Dancing, Alone
"Drowning In the Deep End"	2023	Dancing, Alone
"Little Lovin'"	2024	Non-album singles
"Change Your Mind"	2024	Non-album singles
"Heaven Sent"	2025	Heaven Sent – EP
"Things Got Funny"	2025	Heaven Sent – EP

== Awards and nominations ==
Year	Organization	Award	Work	Result
2018	Radio X	Great X-Pectations 2019	Himself	Included
