= Henry Baines (botanist) =

British botanist (1793–1878)

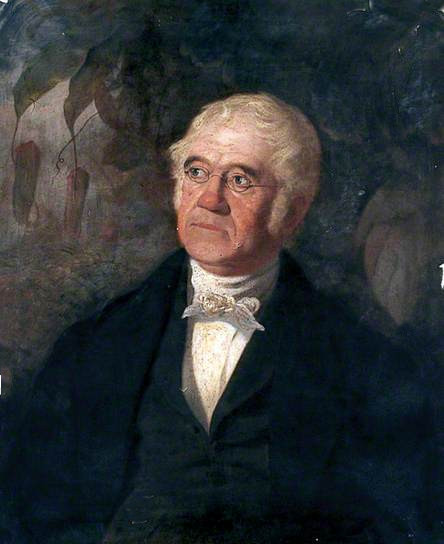
- Painting of Henry Baines by Thomas Joseph Banks
- Born: 15 May 1793
- Died: April 1, 1878 (aged 84); Manor Cottage, York Museum Gardens, York
- Scientific career
- Fields: Botany
- Institutions: York Museum Gardens; Yorkshire Museum
- Author abbrev. (botany): Baines

Henry Baines (15 May 1793 – 1 April 1878) was a notable botanist who lived in York.

== Life ==
Baines was born on 15 May 1793 in a cottage over the cloisters of St. Leonard's Hospital, York. At that time, the cloisters were used by a Mr. Suttle, a wine merchant, to store his wares. Baines took up gardening aged 12, near to the site of the hospital. He spent some time in Halifax, during which he became acquainted with naturalists Samuel Gibson, Abraham Stansfield, John Nowell, and William Wilson, among others.

Upon returning to York, he was appointed 'sub-curator' to the museum of the Yorkshire Philosophical Society in 1828 or 1829, under John Phillips, and by 1830 had already procured over 500 plants for their gardens. He introduced hothouses to the Museum Gardens which displayed tropical plants including Victoria amazonica waterlily and his award-winning carnivorous plants.

His main publication (1840) was his Flora of Yorkshire. During the compilation and publication of this, Richard Spruce was a frequent visitor to the Yorkshire Museum and Baines' residence, often spending Sunday afternoons there.

In 1859 he was presented with 200 guineas by the City of York for 30 years service to the community.

Baines resigned his post in 1870 due to failing health, and due to his forty years' service was allowed to remain at his residence within the gardens. He died there on 1 April 1878.

== Blue plaque ==
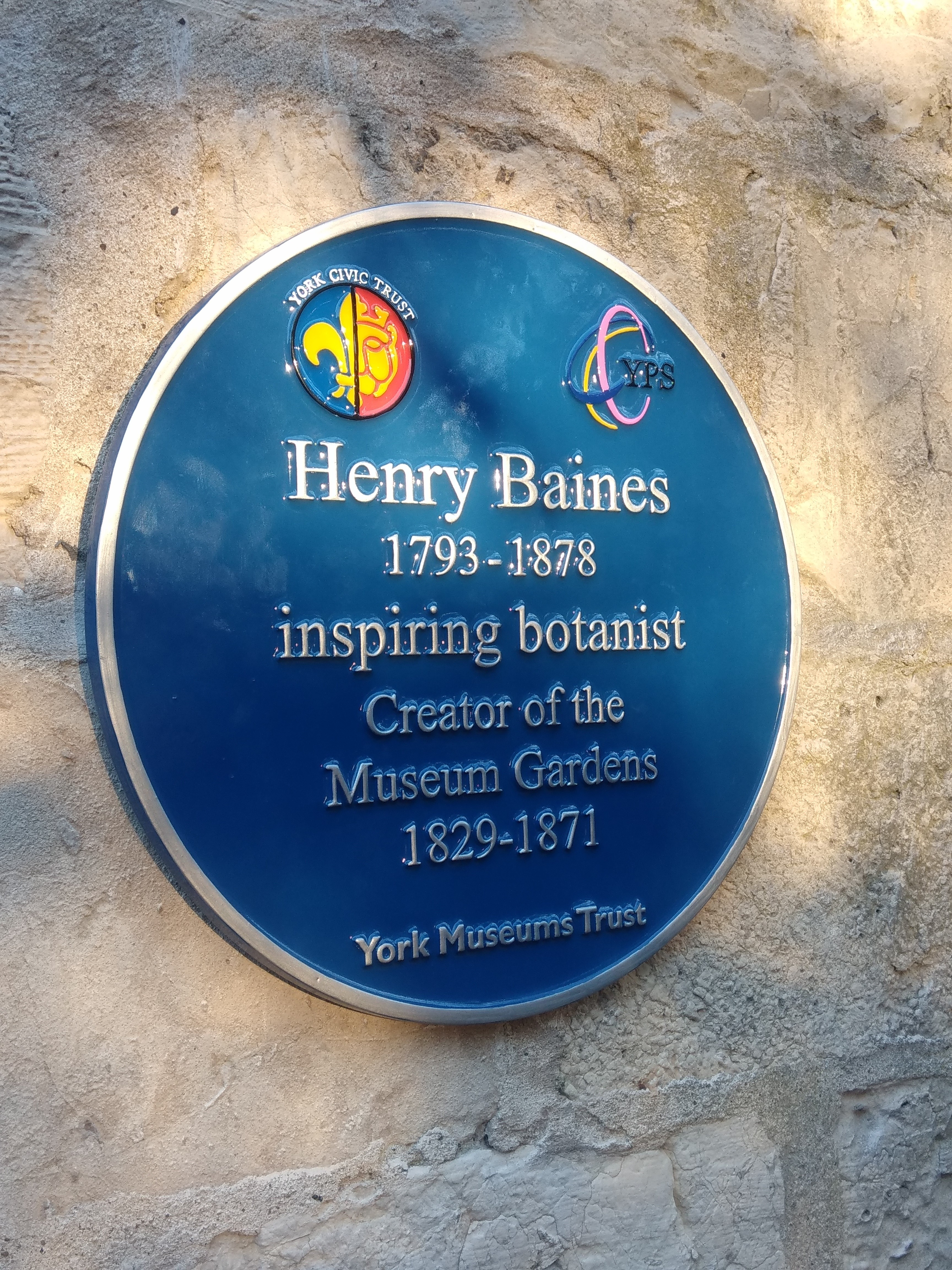
Blue plaque commemorating Henry Baines in the York Museum Gardens

In November 2018 a blue plaque commemorating Henry Baines was erected on the side of Manor Cottage, where Baines lived with his family from 1844. The plaque, dedicated by the Yorkshire Philosophical Society, York Civic Trust and York Museums Trust reads: "Henry Baines, 1793–1878, inspiring botanist. Creator of the Museum Gardens 1829–1871."
