= DSF Refractories & Minerals Ltd =

- Premises in Friden, 2024
- Formerly: Derbyshire Silica Firebrick Co Ltd
- Predecessors: DSF Refractories Ltd; British Hartford-Fairmont Ltd
- Founded: 1993; 33 years ago
- Headquarters: Friden, Derbyshire, United Kingdom
- Number of employees: 115 (2015)

DSF Refractories and Minerals Limited (formerly Derbyshire Silica Firebrick Co Ltd) is the last major British producer of refractory products, both shaped and unshaped. DSF is located in Friden within the Derbyshire's Peak National Park.

DSF is also a processor and supplier of crushed and graded refractory raw materials for other applications such as coloured road-stone. By the 1960s, the business diversified into supplying other industries including steel, glass and cement.

DSF was established in 1993 following the receivership of DSF Refractories Ltd and its parent company BH-F. British Hartford-Fairmont Ltd 'BH-F' had owned the company since 1987. They acquired DSF to support their business in the glass industry from West Group International 'WGI' who had as West Gas Improvement formed the company in 1892 as Derbyshire Silica Firebrick Ltd to support WGI's gas development business by the manufacture of refractories for use in the production of town gas.

Nowadays the brickworks at Friden makes high-alumina refractory bricks and blocks which are exported worldwide for use by the heat containment industries, such as glass, cement, steel and petrochemical manufacturers. The company also supplies refractory minerals to other refractory manufacturers for use in the ceramics industries as well as in welding and road surface products. Despite the closure in the 1990s of the nearby silica pits which supplied raw materials, the company remains a major local employer. As at 2015, it employed approximately 115 people.
