= Pikehall =

Village in Derbyshire, England

Coordinates: 53.129°N 1.715°W

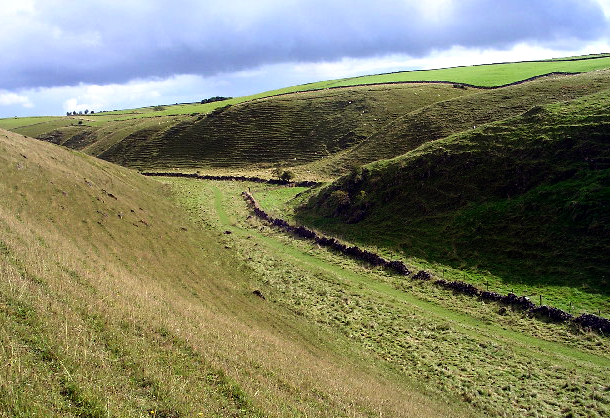
- Long Dale at Pikehall.

- Location within Derbyshire
- OS grid reference: SK191591
- District: Derbyshire Dales
- Shire county: Derbyshire
- Region: East Midlands
- Country: England
- Sovereign state: United Kingdom
- Post town: MATLOCK
- Postcode district: SK17
- Police: Derbyshire
- Fire: Derbyshire
- Ambulance: East Midlands

Pikehall is a small village in the Derbyshire Dales consisting of a few dozen households and a handful of farms. The population of the village is included in the civil parish of Hartington Nether Quarter. The A5012 road runs through the middle, dividing the village in half. The village is home to the annual Y Not Festival.

== Harness racing ==
Pikehall is noted for its twice yearly harness racing, a major tourist attraction in the area. Since the first meeting in 1998 the number of spectators has increased. At the meeting on 12 June 2005 there were estimated to be around 2,000 spectators. Pikehall has been named as the British Harness Racing Clubs meeting of the Year for two years.

== Stilton cheese production ==
The former Dairy Crest-owned licensed dairy that produced Stilton cheese at Hartington closed. The business was acquired by the Long Clawson dairy in 2008 and closed in 2009. Two former employees set up the Hartington Creamery at Pikehall to make the cheese; it was licensed in 2014. Three additional partners soon joined them. This business is the smallest of the six companies licensed to make Stilton. As of March 2021, Hartington Stilton was exporting to the US and to the EU and had just started exporting to Canada. The company director told the BBC that they had "a surge in interest and consumer sales from the US".

== See also ==
- Listed buildings in Hartington Nether Quarter
