= Thomas Bateman (antiquary) =

English antiquary (1821–1861)

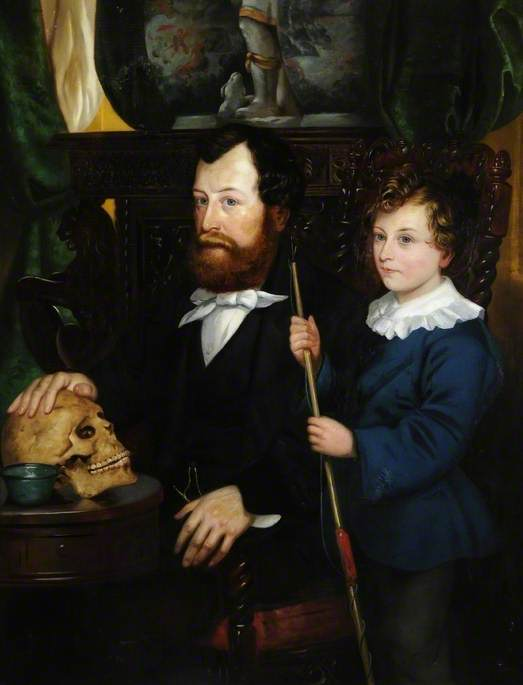
- Thomas Bateman and his son, William Thomas Bateman, by Thomas Joseph Banks in 1860
- Born: 8 November 1821; Rowsley, Derbyshire, England
- Died: 28 August 1861 (aged 39); Middleton-by-Youlgreave, Derbyshire, England
- Occupation: Archaeologist
- Spouse: Sarah
- Children: 4
- Parent(s): William and Mary Bateman

Thomas Bateman (8 November 1821 (baptised) – 28 August 1861) was an English antiquary and barrow-digger.

== Biography ==
Thomas Bateman was born in Rowsley, Derbyshire, England, the son of the amateur archaeologist William Bateman. After the death of his father in 1835, Bateman was raised by his grandfather, and from the age of 16 he helped run the family estate at Middleton Hall in Middleton-by-Youlgreave, during which time he became interested in archaeology: Sir Richard Colt Hoare's Ancient History of North and South Wiltshire influenced him greatly. He built Lomberdale Hall in 1844 as his private residence. Bateman had a long affair with Mary Ann Mason, but she was already married. He married Sarah Parker on 2 August 1847 and they had four daughters and a son.

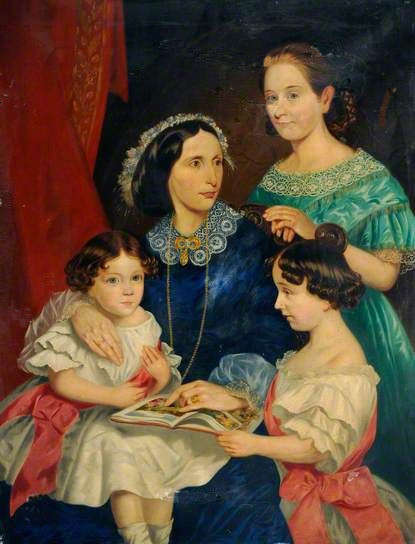
Sarah Bateman and her three daughters by Thomas Joseph Banks

Bateman's first archaeological experience was observing the demolition of a medieval church in Bakewell. He joined the British Archaeological Association in 1843 and in 1844, whilst at an archaeological congress in Canterbury, participated in the excavation of barrows in the surrounding countryside. The following year he excavated 38 barrows in Derbyshire and Staffordshire, earning himself the nickname "The Barrow Knight".

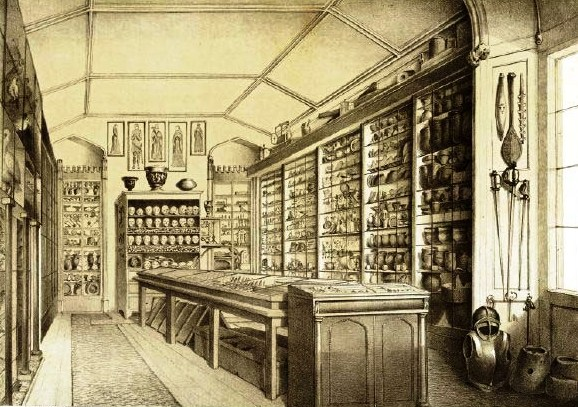
Thomas Bateman's museum at Lomberdale Hall, Middleton-by-Youlgreave

In 1847, he published Vestiges of the Antiquities of Derbyshire which united his work with that of earlier excavators in the area. With the help of Samuel Carrington of Wetton he continued to excavate barrows, 50 in the period 1848–1849 and a further 22 between 1851 and 1861, when he died. His second book was Ten Years' Diggings in Celtic and Saxon Grave Hills in the Counties of Derby, Stafford and York, published in the year of his death and it had the details of his work including Heath Wood barrow cemetery.

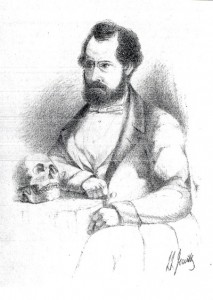
Thomas Bateman as drawn by his close friend Llewellyn Jewitt c.1855

He was buried, following his instructions, in unconsecrated ground on a hillside in Middleton-by-Youlgreave His tomb is a Grade II listed building.

After his death, his son sold most of Bateman's collections, parts of which were acquired by the Sheffield City Museum (now called the Weston Park Museum) in 1893, including the celebrated Benty Grange helmet found in Benty Grange, Derbyshire. A daughter, Clara Theodora Bateman, married Harcourt Clare.

In 2006, a bequest allowed Derbyshire Libraries to purchase a collection that had been amassed by Bateman by inserting documents into the four Derbyshire volumes of Lysons' Magna Britannia. Among the prints was an image of his museum at his home which is dated from around his death. A long description of his museum is found in Eliza Meteyard's novel Dora and her Papa.

== Publications ==
- Vestiges of the Antiquities of Derbyshire, and the Sepulchral Usages of Its Inhabitants (1848), with Stephen Glover
- Bateman, Thomas (1849). "Description of the Contents of a Saxon Barrow". The Journal of the British Archaeological Association. IV: 276–279.
- Bateman, Thomas (1855). A Descriptive Catalogue of the Antiquities and Miscellaneous Objects Preserved in the Museum of Thomas Bateman, at Lomberdale House, Derbyshire. Bakewell: James Gratton.
- Bateman, Thomas (1861). Ten Years' Digging in Celtic and Saxon Grave Hills, in the counties of Derby, Stafford, and York, from 1848 to 1858; with notices of some former discoveries, hitherto unpublished, and remarks on the crania and pottery from the mounds. London: John Russell Smith. pp. 28–33.
