= Newhaven, Derbyshire =

Hamlet in Derbyshire, England

Coordinates: 53.139°N 1.753°W

Newhaven
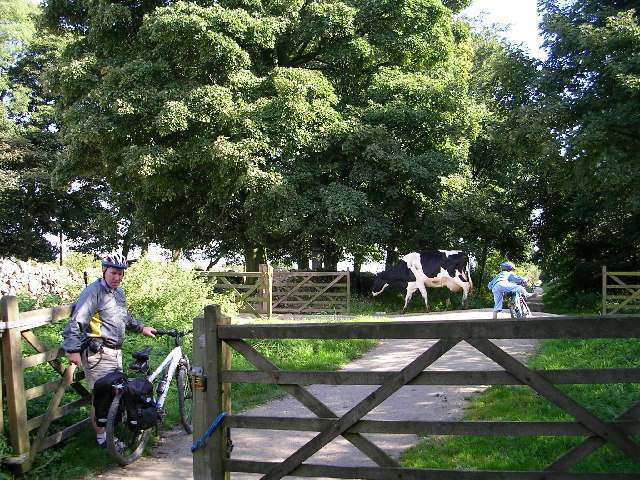
- High Peak Trail near Newhaven.

- Location within Derbyshire
- OS grid reference: SK1660
- District: Derbyshire Dales
- Shire county: Derbyshire
- Region: East Midlands
- Country: England
- Sovereign state: United Kingdom
- Post town: BUXTON
- Postcode district: SK17
- Dialling code: 01298
- Police: Derbyshire
- Fire: Derbyshire
- Ambulance: East Midlands
- UK Parliament: Derbyshire Dales

Newhaven is a hamlet in the county of Derbyshire, England, east of Hartington and west of Cromford.

The principal employer in the area is DSF Refractories & Minerals Ltd. The hamlet is located within the Peak District National Park.

== See also ==
- Listed buildings in Hartington Nether Quarter
