= Steeple House railway station =

Former station in Derbyshire, England

Steeple House
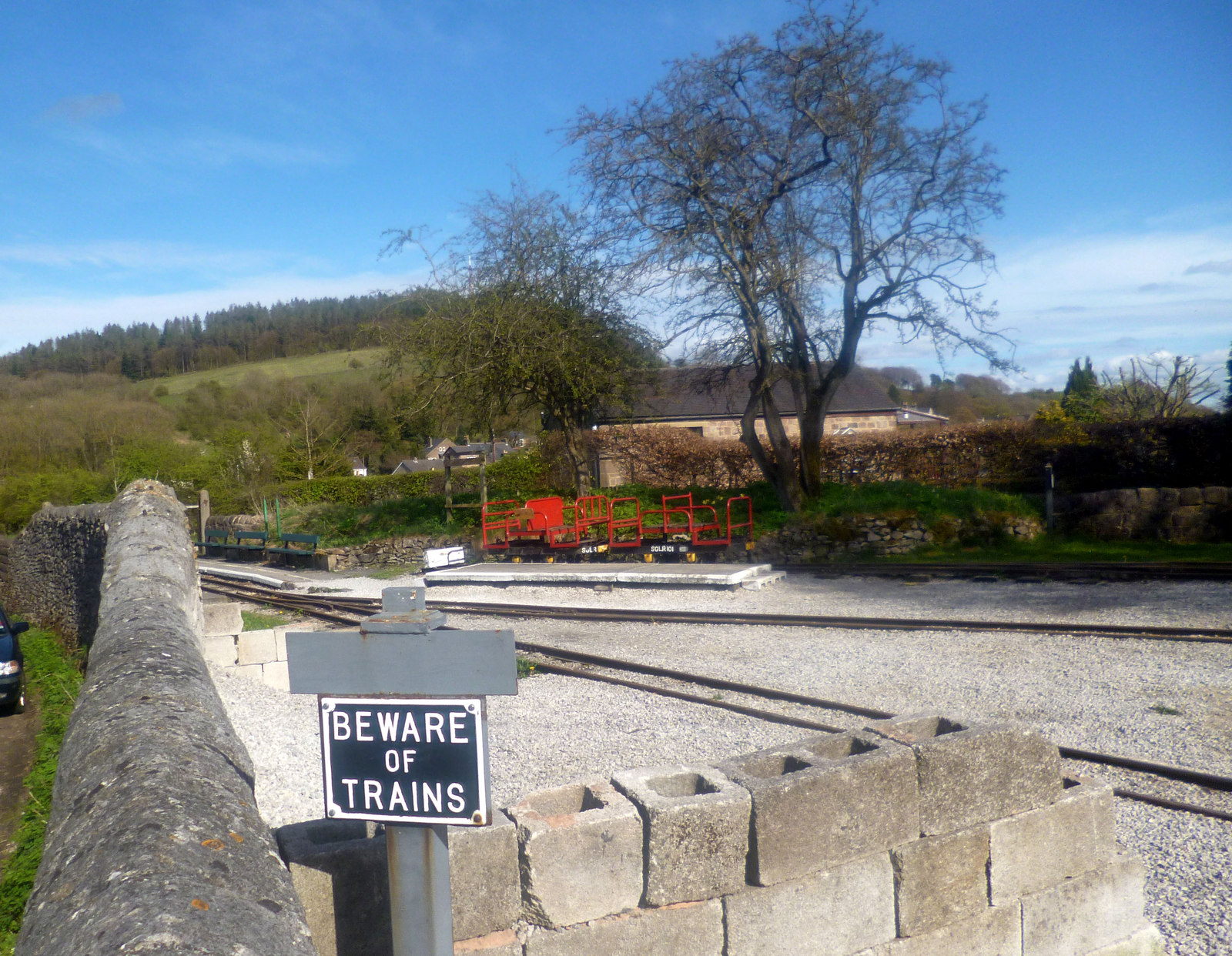
- The site of Steeple House station in 2013

General information
- Location: Wirksworth, Derbyshire Dales; England
- Coordinates: 53.0955°N 1.5708°W

Other information
- Status: Disused

History
- Original company: Cromford and High Peak Railway
- Pre-grouping: London and North Western Railway
- Post-grouping: London, Midland and Scottish Railway

Key dates
- 1855: Opened
- 1876: Closed
- 21 April 1967: Line between Cromford and Parsley Hay closed
- 1971: Trackbed reopened as part of the High Peak Trail
- 1985: The Steeple Grange Light Railway opened near the site on the former Killer's Branch.
Location

Steeple House railway station was a railway station on the Cromford and High Peak Railway serving the market town of Wirksworth and village of Middleton-by-Wirksworth in Derbyshire, England. It was located on the former line between High Peak Junction near Cromford and the Parsley Hay near Buxton.

== History ==
The line through the station was opened in the 1830s to meet the Cromford Canal at Cromford on the River Derwent on the eastern part of the Peak Forest in Derbyshire. It was then built to meet the Peak Forest Canal at Whaley Bridge in the Peak District at the western side of Derbyshire. The opening of this line allowed for goods traders from Manchester and surrounding areas to trade with the wider East Midlands and offered a far more direct connection than the canal did thus making it much easier for traders to transfer and receive goods by rail than boat.

== Opening to passengers ==
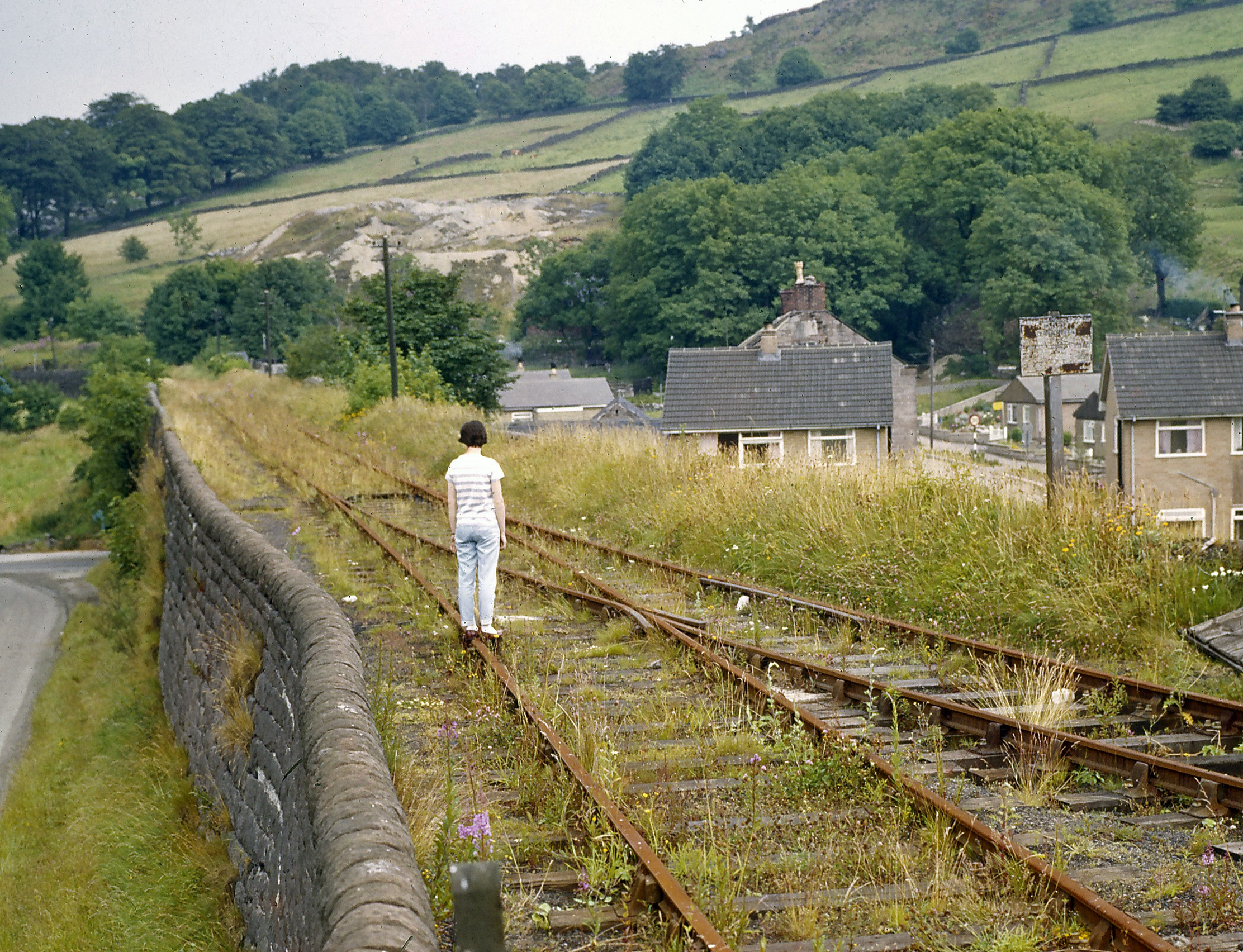
The line and station site in Spring 1967

The station at Steeple House opened in 1855, along with the stations at Middleton, Hopton, Longcliffe and Friden. It was located midway between the Middleton Incline and High Peak Junction. Due to the line being primarily used for movement of freight and goods, passenger services were not given priority and thus due to the amount of sidings and shunting movements along the line. Journeys were very slow and due to the limited populated places along the route, it was a sparsely populated part of the Peak District stops were opened. There was originally a bill to try and introduce through passenger services between Buxton and Steeple House but this was not approved. The only main populated places along this route would have been Cromford, Wirksworth, Buxton and Whaley Bridge. The line did offer though a convenient connection at Parsley Hay for both the Ashbourne Line and the former Manchester, Buxton, Matlock and Midland Junction Railway (now part of the Derwent Valley Line at Whatstandwell Bridge.

== Closure to passengers and opening of the Killer's Branch ==
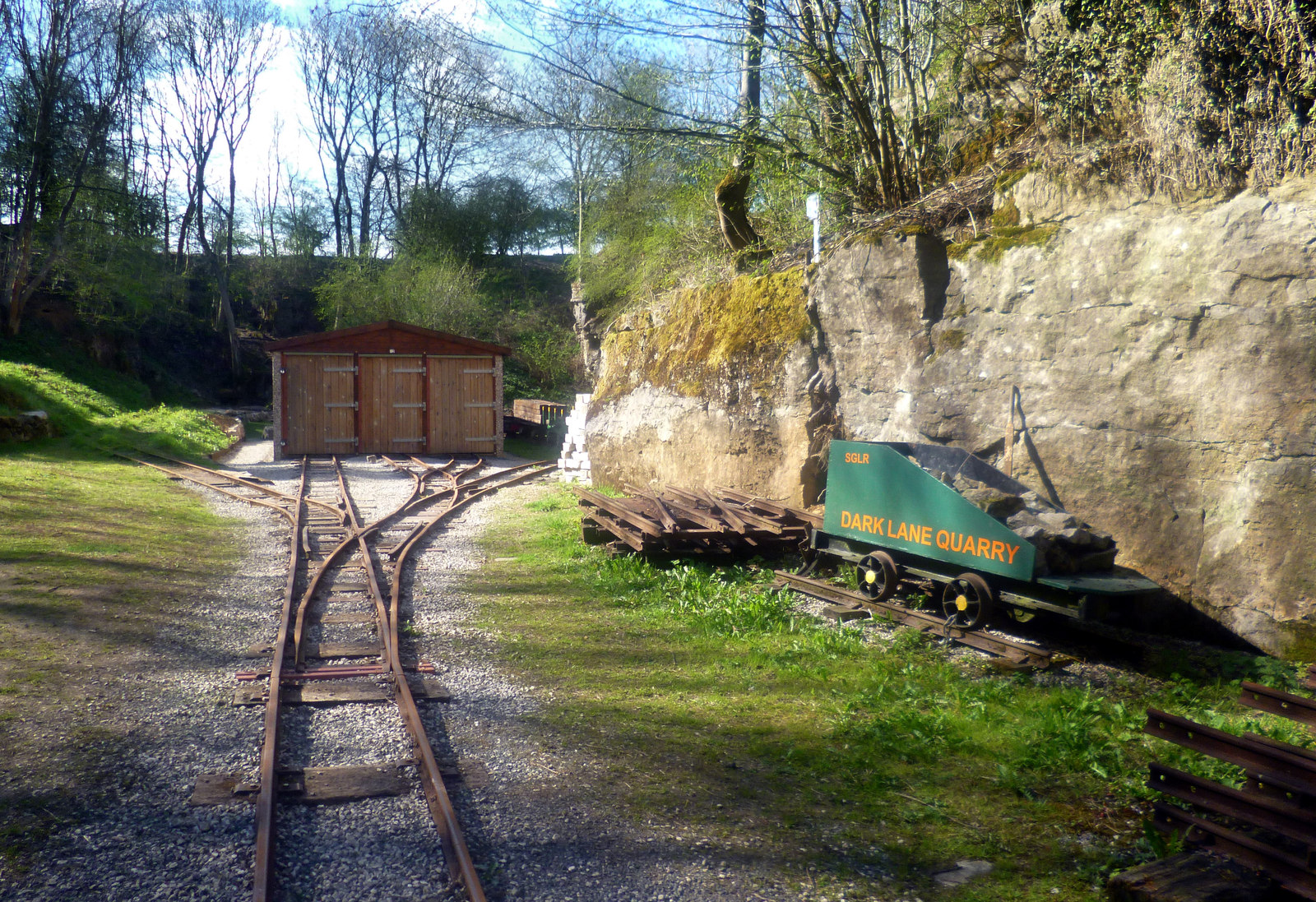
The former Killer's Branch towards Dark Lane Quarry, now used by the Steeple Grange Light Railway

The station was closed in 1876 to passengers. After closure to passengers, a new branch line was opened by the London and North Western Railway nicknamed the Killer's Branch. This connected the line from northeast of the station to the Hoptonwood Stone Firms. The line ran to both the Dark Lane Quarry and the Hopton Wood Stone Quarry. This line opened in 1884 and continued to be used for freight until 1967. The line has been partly repurposed for the Steeple Grange Light Railway.

== Later history and line closure ==
A goods station was opened near the site named "Steeplehouse & Wirksworth Goods Yard". It consisted of three sidings and a few goods sheds. Mostly for moving mineral and quarry traffic.There were several sidings around the station serving limestone quarries. The line remained in use until 21 April 1967, when it closed to all mineral traffic. Traffic along the line began to see slight decline in the 1960s and then by 1967, the railway was closed through station. It was later purchased by Derbyshire County Council in 1971 to be repurposed for the High Peak Trail, using both the trackbed and station site through Steeple House between Parsley Hay on the Tissington Trail and near High Peak Junction at Cromford.

== Present day ==
The National Stone Centre located near to the site and the track bed forms part of the High Peak Trail. A section of the former line is used by the Steeplehouse Grange Light Railway.

== Route ==
Preceding station	Disused railways	Following station
Middleton	Cromford and High Peak Railway	Whatstandwell Bridge
