= Middleton railway station (Derbyshire) =

Former station in Derbyshire, England

Middleton
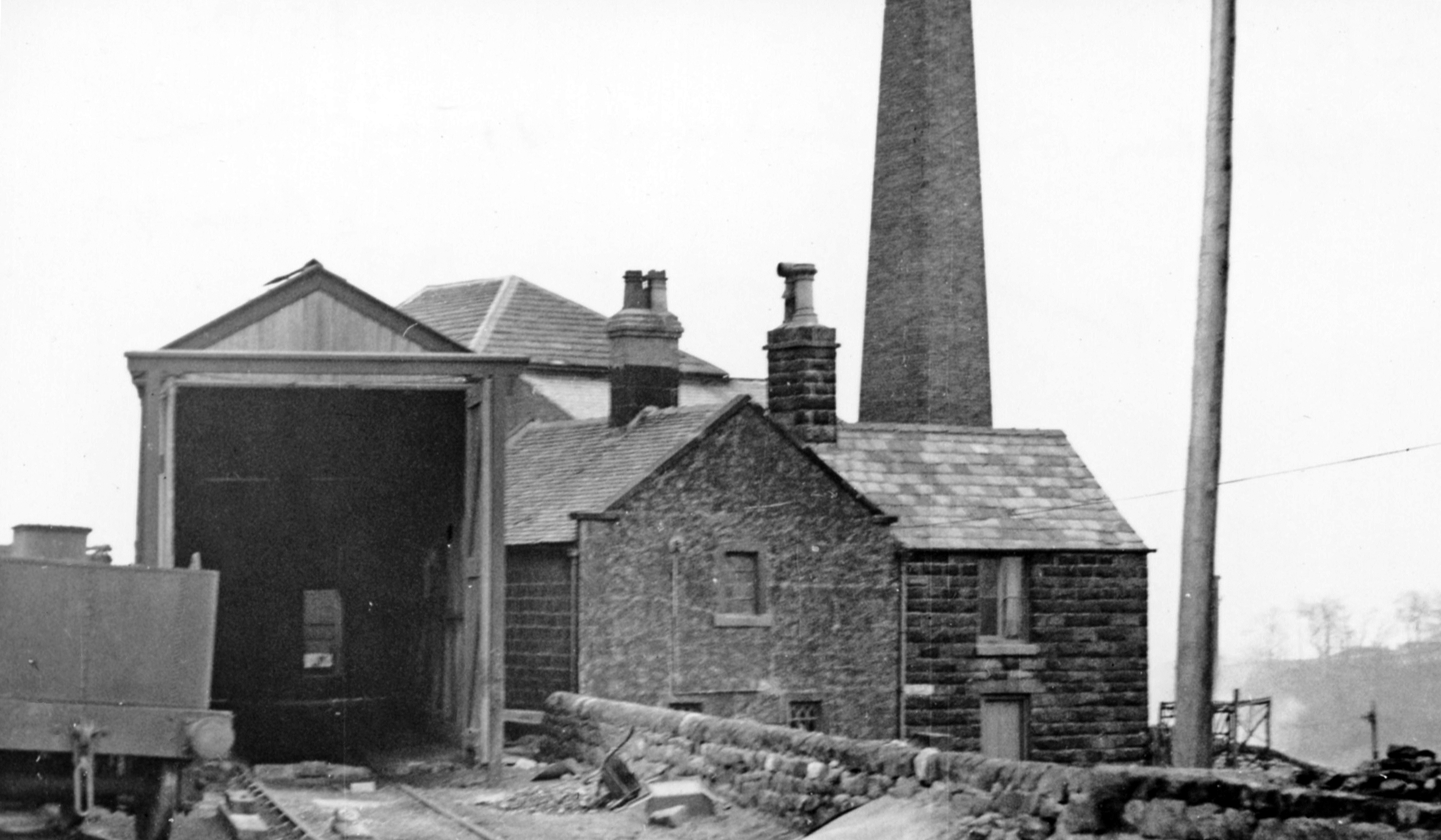
- The Middleton Top Engine Shed and Winding House in 1949, the station was near the brick wall on the right

General information
- Location: Middleton-by-Wirksworth, Derbyshire Dales; England
- Coordinates: 53.0930°N 1.5903°W

Other information
- Status: Disused

History
- Original company: Cromford and High Peak Railway
- Pre-grouping: London and North Western Railway
- Post-grouping: London, Midland and Scottish Railway

Key dates
- 1855: Opened
- 1877: Closed
- 21 April 1967: Line between Cromford and Parsley Hay closed
- 1971: Trackbed reopened as part of the High Peak Trail
Location

Middleton railway station was a railway station on the Cromford and High Peak Railway serving the village of Middleton-by-Wirksworth in Derbyshire, England. It was located on the former line between High Peak Junction near Cromford and the Parsley Hay near Buxton.

== History ==
The line through the station was opened in the 1830s to meet the Cromford Canal at Cromford on the River Derwent on the eastern part of the Peak Forest in Derbyshire. It was then built to meet the Peak Forest Canal at Whaley Bridge in the Peak District at the western side of Derbyshire. The opening of this line allowed for goods traders from Manchester and surrounding areas to trade with the wider East Midlands and offered a far more direct connection than the canal did thus making it much easier for traders to transfer and receive goods by rail than boat.

== Opening to passengers ==
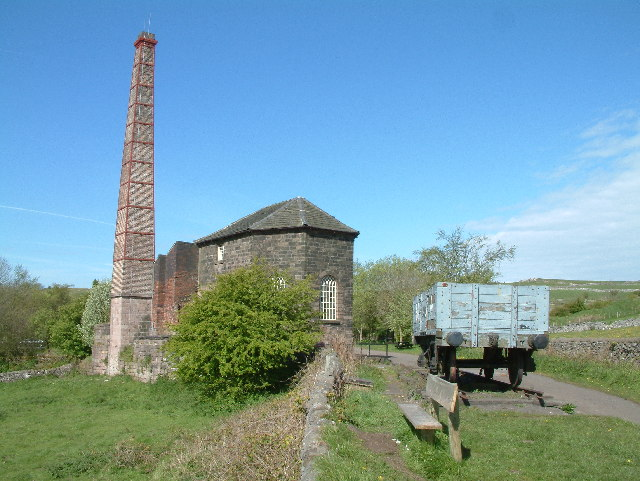
Middleton Top engine shed in 2005

The station at Middleton opened in 1855, along with the stations at Steeple House, Hopton, Longcliffe and Friden. It was located midway between the Middleton Incline and the Hopton Tunnel leading to the Hopton Incline. Due to the line being primarily used for movement of freight and goods, passenger services were not given priority and thus due to the amount of sidings and shunting movements along the line. Journeys were very slow and due to the limited populated places along the route, it was a sparsely populated part of the Peak District stops were opened. There was originally a bill to try and introduce through passenger services between Buxton and Steeple House but this was not approved. The only main populated places along this route would have been Cromford, Wirksworth, Buxton and Whaley Bridge. The line did offer though a convenient connection at Parsley Hay for both the Ashbourne Line and the former Manchester, Buxton, Matlock and Midland Junction Railway (now part of the Derwent Valley Line at Whatstandwell Bridge.

== Closure to passengers ==
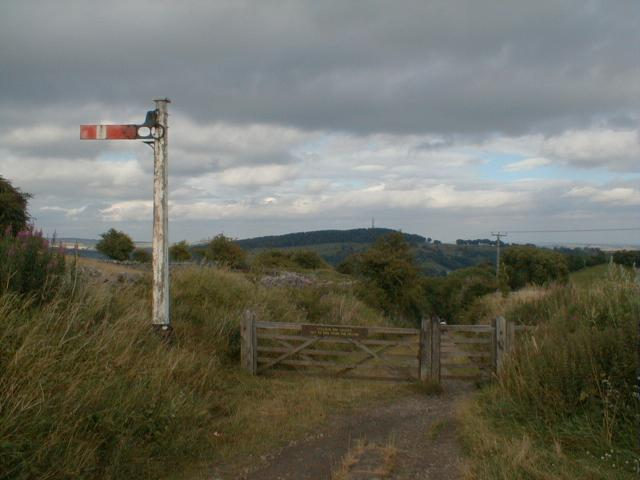
Old signal post at Middleton Top in 2000

The station was closed in 1877 to passengers. After closure to passengers, the line remained in use for both mineral and freight traffic until closure of the entire line on the 21 April 1967. The line was later purchased by Derbyshire County Council in 1971 and reopened the line through Middleton Top and its engine house as part of the High Peak Trail.

== Present day ==
The site of the station and trackbed is now part of the High Peak Trail and there is also a cycling hire centre on the site of the old station. The Engine House and its associated buildings are scheduled monuments.

== Route ==
Preceding station	Disused railways	Following station
Longcliffe	Cromford and High Peak Railway	Steeple House
