= Longcliffe railway station =

Former station in Derbyshire, England

Longcliffe
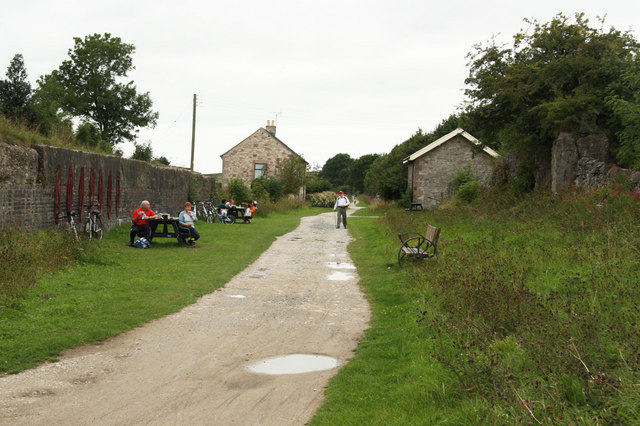
- Site of Longcliffe station in 2010

General information
- Location: Longcliffe, Derbyshire Dales; England
- Coordinates: 53.0979°N 1.6644°W

Other information
- Status: Disused

History
- Original company: Cromford and High Peak Railway
- Pre-grouping: London and North Western Railway
- Post-grouping: London, Midland and Scottish Railway

Key dates
- 1855: Opened
- 1877: Closed
- 21 April 1967: Line between Cromford and Parsley Hay closed
- 1971: Trackbed reopened as part of the High Peak Trail
Location

Longcliffe railway station was a railway station on the Cromford and High Peak Railway serving the villages of Longcliffe and Brassington in Derbyshire, England. It was located on the former line between High Peak Junction near Cromford and the Parsley Hay near Buxton. The former station is a Grade II listed building. The track now forms part of the High Peak Trail.

== History ==
The line through the station was opened in the 1830s to meet the Cromford Canal at Cromford on the River Derwent on the eastern part of the Peak Forest in Derbyshire. It was then extended to meet the Peak Forest Canal at Whaley Bridge in the Peak District at the western side of Derbyshire. The opening of this line allowed for goods traders from Manchester and the surrounding areas to trade with the wider East Midlands and offered a more direct connection than the canal, making it much easier for traders to transfer and receive goods by rail than boat.

== Opening to passengers ==
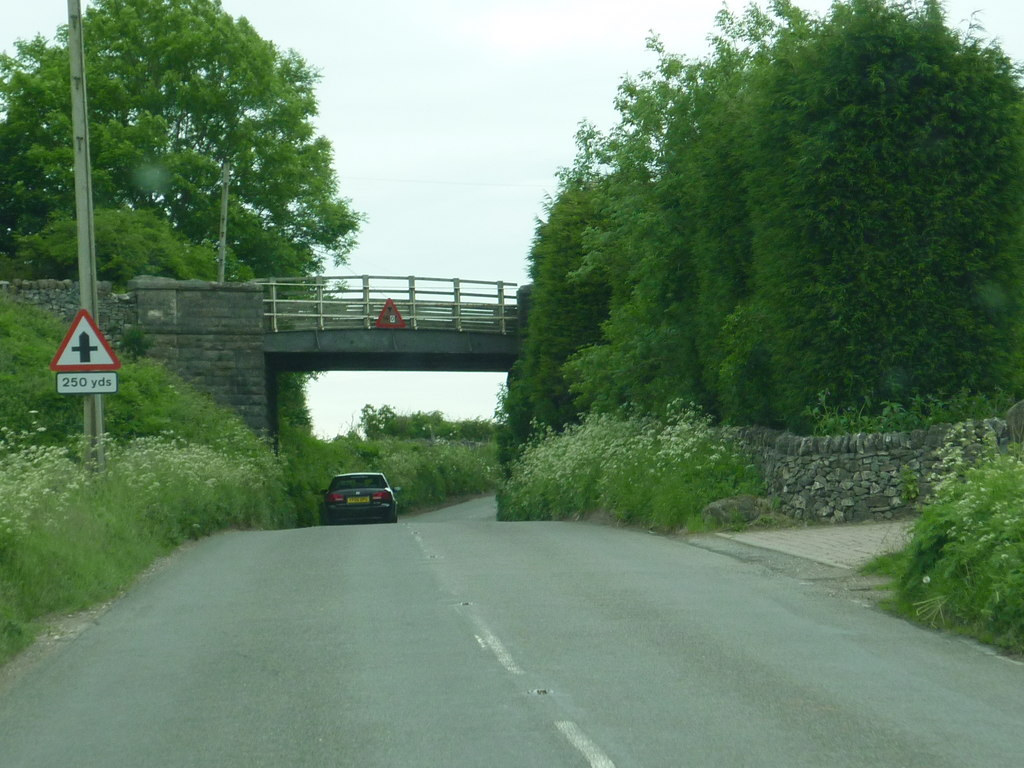
The former railway bridge crossing Coach Road, near Longcliffe

The station at Longcliffe opened in 1855, along with the stations at Steeple House, Middleton, Hopton and Friden. It was located midway between the Hopton Incline and the Gotham Curve. Due to the line being primarily used for movement of freight and goods, passenger services were not given priority and thus, due to the amount of sidings and shunting movements along the line, journeys were very slow.

Due to the sparse population in this part of the Peak District, few stops were opened. A parliamentary bill to introduce through-passenger services between Buxton and Steeple House was not successful. The main populated places along this route were Cromford, Wirksworth, Buxton and Whaley Bridge, and the line did offer a connection at Parsley Hay for both the Ashbourne Line and the former Manchester, Buxton, Matlock and Midland Junction Railway (now part of the Derwent Valley Line at Whatstandwell Bridge).

== Closure to passengers ==
The station was closed to passengers in 1877, the line remaining in use for mineral and freight traffic until complete closure in 1967.

== Longcliffe Goods Yard ==
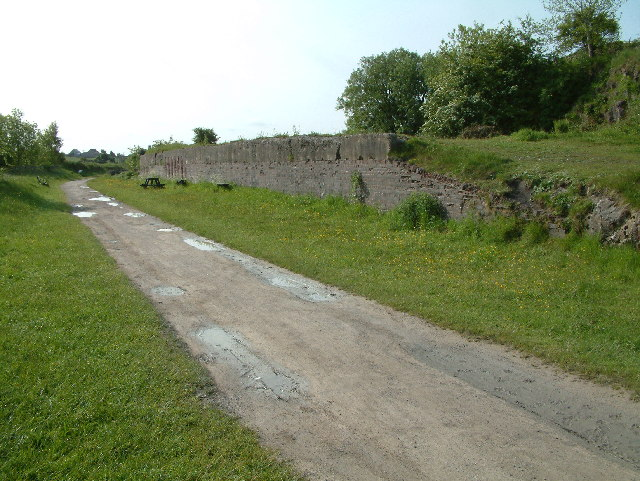
The former Longcliffe Goods Yard Single Platform near the wharf

Longcliffe Goods Yard was a goods station located on the Cromford and High Peak Railway in Longcliffe, Derbyshire, principally for mineral and quarry traffic. It closed in 1967 along with the rest of the line. Nothing remains of the goods yard except the former single platform.

== Present day ==
After closure of the line, in 1971, the trackbed was purchased by Derbyshire County Council and converted into the High Peak Trail. The station building was given Grade II listed building status in 1983 by Historic England and is now a private residence. The High Peak Trail now passes through the station site.

== Route ==
Preceding station	Disused railways	Following station
Friden	Cromford and High Peak Railway	Middleton
