= Friden railway station =

Former station in Derbyshire, England

Friden
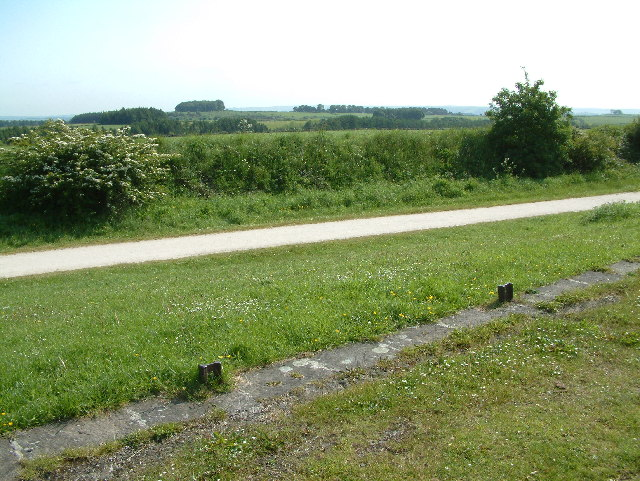
- Friden station site in 2005

General information
- Location: Friden, Derbyshire Dales; England
- Coordinates: 53.1443°N 1.7457°W

Other information
- Status: Disused

History
- Original company: Cromford and High Peak Railway
- Pre-grouping: London and North Western Railway
- Post-grouping: London, Midland and Scottish Railway

Key dates
- 1855: Opened
- 1877: Closed
- 21 April 1967: Line between Cromford and Parsley Hay closed
- 1971: Trackbed reopened as part of the High Peak Trail
Location

Friden railway station was a railway station on the Cromford and High Peak Railway serving the villages of Friden and Newhaven in Derbyshire, England. It was located on the former line between High Peak Junction near Cromford and the Parsley Hay near Buxton. After closure of the line in 1967, the trackbed was incorporated into the High Peak Trail. The former stationmaster's house is a Grade II listed building.

== History ==
The line through the station was opened in the 1830s to meet the Cromford Canal at Cromford on the River Derwent on the eastern part of the Peak Forest in Derbyshire. It was then extended to meet the Peak Forest Canal at Whaley Bridge in the Peak District at the western side of Derbyshire. The opening of this line allowed goods traders from Manchester and the surrounding areas to trade with the wider East Midlands and offered a more direct connection than the canal making it much easier for traders to transfer and receive goods by rail than boat.

== Opening to passengers ==
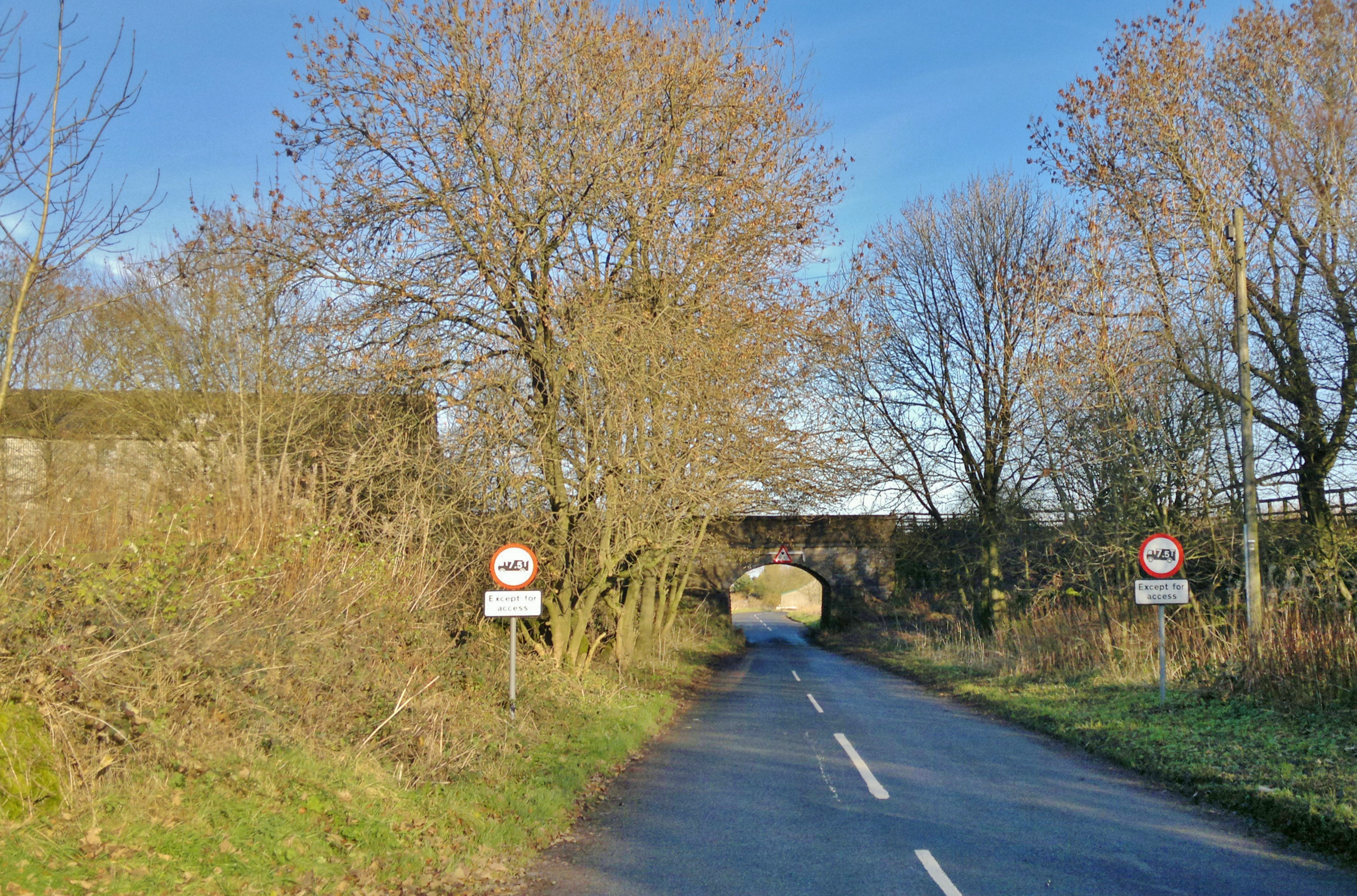
Old railway bridge at Friden, crossing an unmarked road

The station at Friden opened in 1855, along with the stations at Steeple House, Middleton, Hopton and Longcliffe. It was located midway between the Gotham Curve and the junction with the Ashbourne line. As the line was primarily used for the movement of freight and goods, passenger services were not given priority. The number of sidings and shunting movements along the line made journeys slow, and due to the sparse population in this part of the Peak District few stops were opened. A parliamentary bill to introduce through-passenger services between Buxton and Steeple House was not successful. The main populated places along this route were Cromford, Wirksworth, Buxton and Whaley Bridge. The line did offer a convenient connection at Parsley Hay for both the Ashbourne line and the former Manchester, Buxton, Matlock and Midland Junction Railway (now part of the Derwent Valley line at Whatstandwell Bridge.

== Closure to passengers ==
The station was closed to passengers in 1877, the line remaining in use for both mineral and freight traffic until complete closure in 1967.

== Friden Goods Yard ==
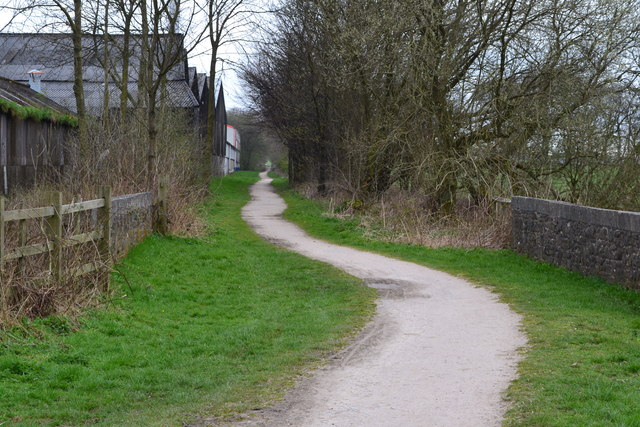
Looking towards the site of Friden Goods Yard

Friden Goods Yard was a goods station located on the Cromford and High Peak Railway near the village of Friden in Derbyshire. Mostly for moving mineral and quarry traffic. It closed in 1967 along with the rest of the line and nothing remains of the goods yard. The trackbed now forms part of the High Peak Trail.

== Present day ==
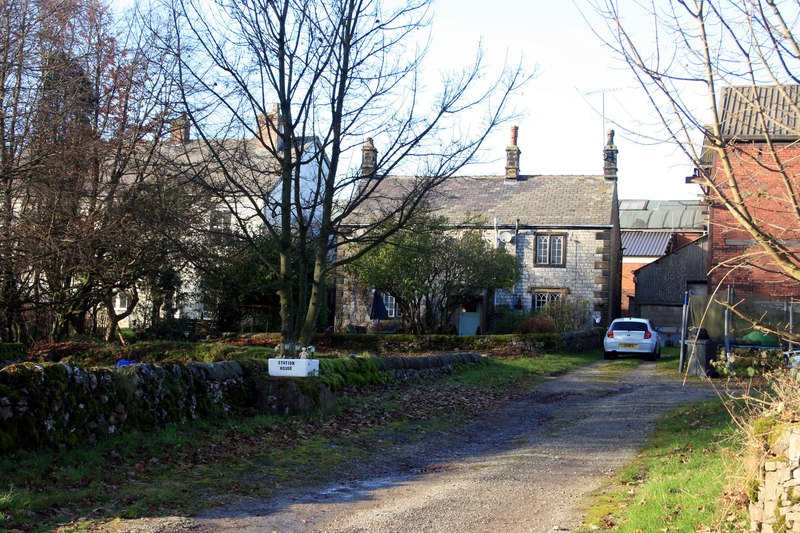
The Grade II listed Station House, which was the station masters house.

After closure of the line, in 1971, the line was purchased by Derbyshire County Council and was converted into the High Peak Trail. The High Peak Trail now passes through the station site with only part of the platform still visible. The station masters house now renamed "Station House" which is near the site was given Grade II listed building status by Historic England in 1984.

== Route ==
| Preceding station | Disused railways | Following station |
|---|---|---|
| Parsley Hay | Cromford and High Peak Railway | Longcliffe |
