= Gotham Curve =

Railway curve in Derbyshire, England

Coordinates: 53.1234°N 1.7213°W

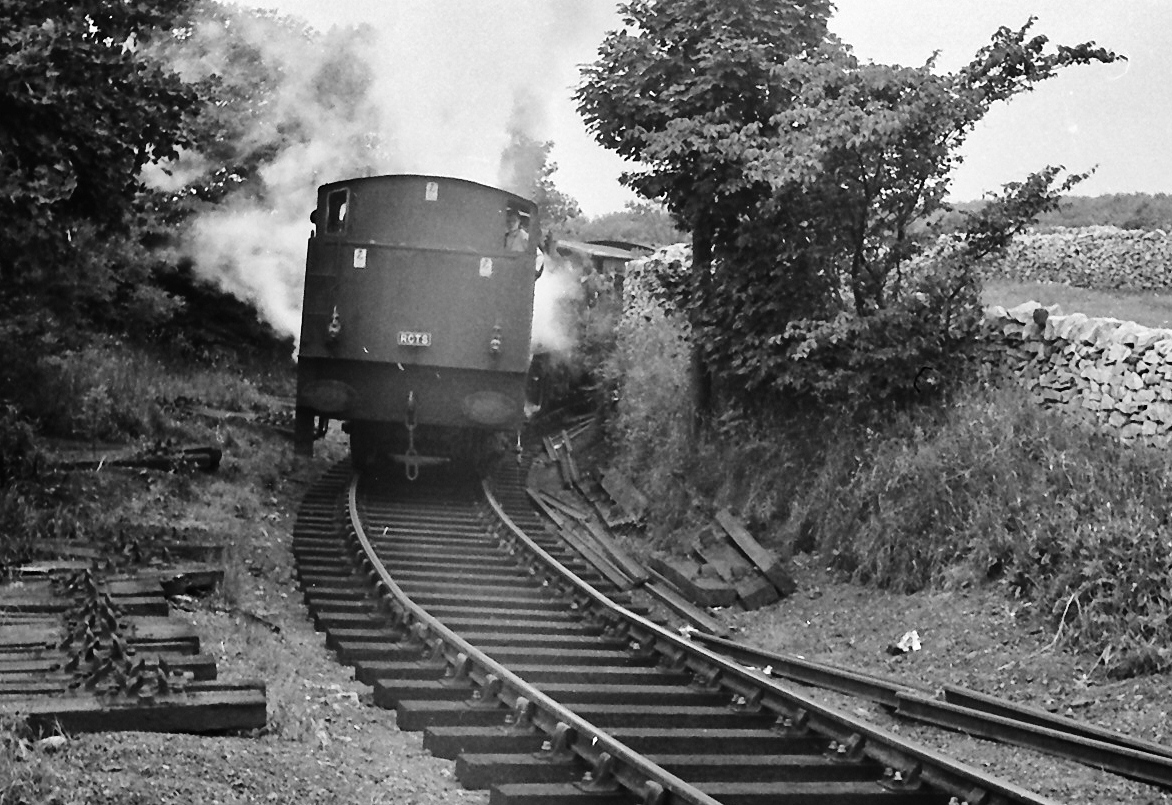
A railtour rounds the curve carrying enthusiasts in brake vans and open wagons in 1964.

The Gotham Curve was once the sharpest curve on any standard gauge railway line in the UK. The curve, which was situated in the sparsely populated, exposed limestone uplands in the Peak District of Derbyshire, England, was on the Cromford and High Peak Railway. The single-track main line was inherited by British Railways in 1948. It closed in 1967.

== Description ==
Although sharper curves were present on industrial sidings and harbour railways, the line through the Gotham curve went through an 80 degree curve with a radius of 55 yards (50 m). The curve was subject to a speed limit of 5 mph (8 km/h) and led "the platelayer [..] to keep a supply of rail chairs and other spares to hand in case a driver "burst the rails" when negotiating the curve." It might have once had a steep camber but none was present in 1954 when there were check-rails in place.

== History ==
The section of line including the curve opened on 29 May 1830. Initially, trains through the curve were horse-drawn, but the intention, as enshrined in the enabling legislation, was also to use steam locomotives, the first of which started work in 1833. Horse-haulage through the curve had finished by the mid-1860s. Diesel shunter 12006 was tested through the curve in 1959, but was considered unsuitable, largely because it was barely able to climb the line's other extreme feature, the Hopton Incline. A further trial took place in August 1966, using Class 08 diesel shunter D3778. The locomotive was rostered to take over from steam from 31 August 1966 but for some reason it did not happen and steam monopolised the curve until closure the following spring. Trains were conventional, but locomotives and rolling stock nevertheless had to be carefully selected. Only short wheelbase wagons, tenders and brake vans were permitted and few locomotives could negotiate the extreme curvature without putting machine and track under unacceptable strain. This led to a limited number of locomotive types using the curve for unusually long periods. Starting in 1931 several NLR 0-6-0Ts were moved from the London area to the line, remaining there until 1956, when they were progressively displaced by a small fleet of J94 0-6-0STs, which worked the stretch until closure. The last NLR loco, No. 58850, was withdrawn in 1960 and has been preserved. Both classes of locomotive, despite having six-coupled wheels, were specifically designed for low-speed, high power dock and shunting work, where they could encounter severe curves and gradients.

Passenger services ran through the curve from 1833 to 1876, some were horse-drawn, the rest steam-hauled. Loadings in this sparsely populated upland area were very light. Evidence of the forms of provision is patchy and inconsistent, with the clearest sources being anecdotal. Some horse-drawn provision appears to have been based on stagecoaches, with inside and outside provision similar to the 'Dandy' used on the service to Port Carlisle. In locomotive-hauled trains passengers were accommodated by attaching a specially adapted guard's van to conventional goods trains; the adaptation consisted of putting some seating in the van's goods section. Like a number of other features on the line, this vehicle was given a name - Fly - inherited from the canal world, though the term appears to have been used interchangeably to mean the vehicle and the train.

Passenger traffic was slight and general goods was substantially less than the line's promoters foresaw, especially after the line was effectively bypassed in the 1860s then truncated in 1892. The sparsely populated, largely agricultural area surrounding the curve meant that coal was the only significant inflow and milk the only significant outflow, except for the one traffic which dominated all – stone products, notably limestone and burnt lime. This traffic grew, and kept the line open despite its many operating obstacles, of which the curve was but one. Towards the end the curve's significance grew, as quarrying processes became more efficient and rail sought higher payloads the light trains of short wheelbase-only rolling stock kept trains short and composed of small, slow-moving, obsolescent and uneconomic wagons. There was one other traffic, a 19th Century relic, whereby the line carried water. Limestone uplands drain naturally, so, despite the high rainfall, water supply to outlying properties was a problem. Some railway properties needed water, the railway itself needed water and in the 1960s Prestwich Intake Quarry needed water, so it was carried on trains using former locomotive tenders specially adapted by adding buffers at each end and, where a tender originally had six wheels, the centre wheels were removed. This last adaptation helped on the Gotham Curve, but was required to enable such vehicles to pass over the extreme vertical curves at the feet and especially the tops of Sheep Pasture and Middleton Inclines Tanks were mostly replenished from a spring at the foot of Sheep Pasture Incline, then worked up towards Parsley Hay as required, but some replenishment took place at Buxton, the tenders being worked southwards onto the High Peak line. This duality ensured continuity of supply if, for example, Sheep Pasture Incline was out of action. From the early 1960s more modern and more capacious six-wheeled tenders started to appear among the traditional vehicles north of Middleton, especially after Middleton Incline closed in 1963.

== Special trains ==
The Cromford and High Peak Railway was promoted in the 1820s and opened in two stages in 1830 and 1831. By 1900 it had been reduced by half, but the remaining half had many archaic features, of which the Gotham Curve was one. After the Second World War it attracted a wide following among railway enthusiasts, which is reflected in the volume of print and film material; it was also reflected in the number of special passenger trains run between 1953 and closure in 1967. As only short-wheelbase rolling stock could be used, participants paid significant monies to travel in guards vans and open wagons. The highlight of such tours was to participate in trains storming the Hopton Incline, but "rumbling, grinding and squealing" round the Gotham Curve was seen as a key part of the experience.

== Legacy ==
In 1971 the Peak Park Planning Board and Derbyshire County Council bought the track bed from north of the site of Hurdlow station, near Buxton, through Gotham Curve to High Peak Junction, near Cromford and turned it into the High Peak Trail, which is now National Route 54 of the National Cycle Network. The trail is popular with walkers, cyclists and horse riders.

The High Peak Trail is also designated as part of the Pennine Bridleway, a leisure route that starts at Middleton Top, near Cromford, and includes 73 miles (117 km) through Derbyshire to the South Pennines.

The curve was dramatic in railway terms, but as part of an off-road trail it does not catch the public's imagination, particularly when compared with inclines, embankments, machinery, buildings and scenery. It is, nevertheless, preserved and mentioned, if not proclaimed.

== See also ==
- Horseshoe Curve (Pennsylvania) - a historic three-track railroad curve on the Norfolk Southern Railway in Pennsylvania, United States
