= Hopton Incline =

Coordinates: 53.0883697°N 1.6219715°W

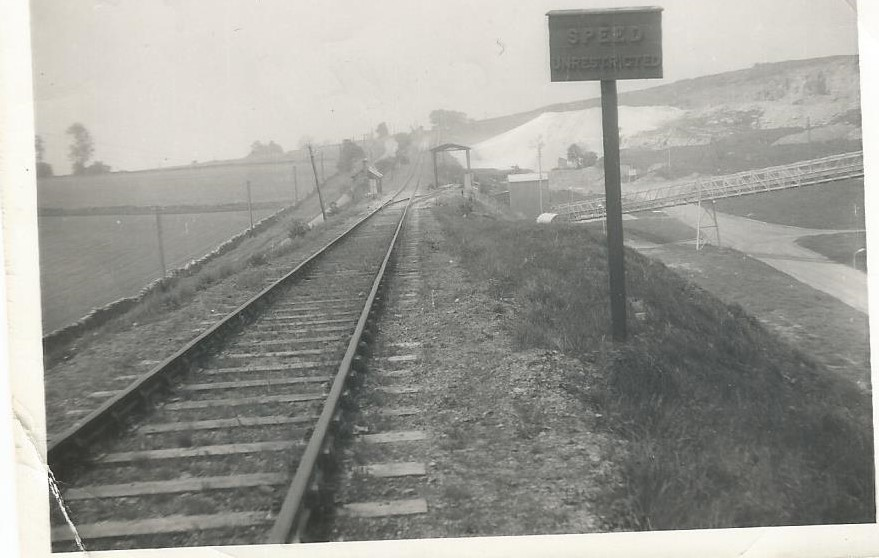
Hopton incline in c. 1964

The Hopton Incline was the steepest stretch of conventional, adhesion-worked standard gauge railway in the UK. The incline was situated in sparsely populated, exposed limestone uplands in the Peak District of Derbyshire, England.

It is possible that steeper stretches were to be found in sidings, but the Hopton Incline was on the former Cromford and High Peak Railway's single-track main line as inherited by British Railways.

== Inclines ==
Part of the line opened in 1830 with the remainder following in 1831; Hopton Incline was in the first, southern part. The 33 mi (53 km) route originally included nine inclined planes, which were often referred to as "planes" rather than "inclines"; staff who worked on inclines, for example, were formally known as "Planemen". Initially, all nine planes were double track. Trains were chain-hauled, eight were powered by a stationary winding engine at the summit, with ascending and descending wagons acting as counterbalances to ease the load. The Whaley Bridge incline was initially horse-drawn. At first trains were horse-drawn between inclines, with steam locomotives starting to appear in 1833, becoming universal by the 1860s except on the Whaley Bridge incline. Inclines were a means to cross hilly terrain, but they imposed significant costs in money and time.

By the 1870s Hopton Incline's winding engine had given 40 years' service and was life-expired. During that time locomotive power had improved, in 1877 Hopton incline's chains and engines were removed, after which the incline became a conventional adhesion railway; trains ascended the bank under their own power and descended using their own brakes. The more westerly line on the incline fell into disuse and was lifted at some time between 1889 and 1903. In 1886 an inspector recommended the gradient be eased to allow greater loads, but nothing happened until 1903 when the trackbed at the foot of the incline was raised to ease the slope, which northbound trains approached at the gently downhill gradient of 1 in 1056. The top was also shaved to ease a short final stretch to 1 in 470. From the bottom the amended slope became progressively steeper in stages: 1 in 60 for 200 yards (180 m), 1 in 30 for 75 yards (69 m), 1 in 20 for 100 yards (91 m), then 200 yards (180 m) at 1 in 14, easing to 1 in 470 before levelling off. The approach was gentle downhill, but it included (for a railway) a fairly sharp bend of 20 chains (400 m) radius, 160 yards (150 m) before the incline foot.

=== Incline locations ===
From south to north, Hopton was one of several inclines on the Cromford and High Peak Railway:

Incline	Length	Gradient	Notes
Cromford	580 yards (530 m)	1 in 9	Combined with Sheep Pasture in 1857, combined name "Sheep Pasture Incline"
Sheep Pasture	711 yards (650 m)	1 in 8	Combined with Cromford in 1857, combined name "Sheep Pasture Incline"
Middleton	708 yards (647 m)	1 in 8½	
Hopton	457 yards (418 m)	1 in 14	Chain-hauled until 1877, conventional adhesion thereafter
Hurdlow	850 yards (777 m)	1 in 16	Bypassed and abandoned 1869
Bunsall Upper	660 yards (604 m)	1 in 17½	Combined with Bunsall Lower in 1857, combined name "Bunsall Incline", abandoned 1892
Bunsall Lower	455 yards (416 m)	1 in 7	Combined with Bunsall Upper in 1857, combined name "Bunsall Incline", abandoned 1892
Shallcross	817 yards (747 m)	1 in 10¼	Abandoned 1892
Whaley Bridge	180 yards (165 m)	1 in 13½	Abandoned 1952

== Services ==
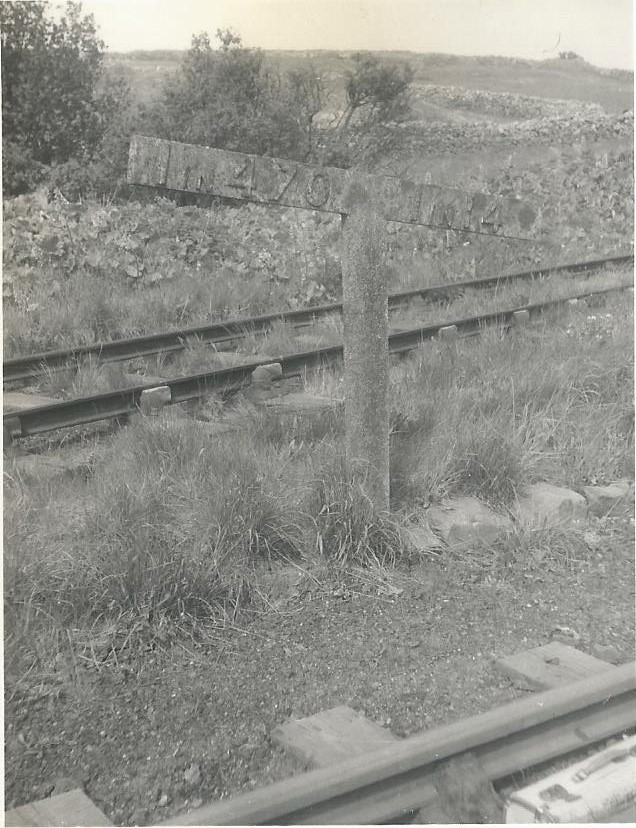
Hopton Incline in 1964

The section of line including the incline was opened on 29 May 1830. Initially, trains to and from the incline were horse-drawn, but the intention, as enshrined in the enabling legislation, was also to use steam locomotives, the first of which started work in 1833. Horse-haulage finished by the mid-1860s. Steam locomotives started to use the incline from 18 April 1877. Diesel shunter 12006 was trialled in 1959, but was considered unsuitable, largely because it was barely able to climb the incline on its own, without any load. A further trial took place in August 1966, using Class 08 diesel shunter D3778. The locomotive was rostered to take over from steam from 31 August 1966, but for unknown reasons it did not happen and steam monopolised the incline until closure the following spring. Trains were conventional, but locomotives and rolling stock nevertheless had to be carefully selected. Only four-wheeled wagons, tenders and brake vans were permitted and few locomotives could negotiate Gotham Curve's extreme curvature without putting machine and track under unacceptable strain. This led to a limited number of locomotive types using the curve for unusually long periods.

In 1931 several NLR 0-6-0Ts were moved from the London area to the line, remaining there until 1960, when they were displaced by a small fleet of J94 0-6-0STs, which worked the stretch until closure. Both classes of locomotive, despite having six-coupled wheels, were specifically designed for low-speed, high power dock and shunting work, where they could encounter severe curves and gradients. Not only was short wheelbase rolling stock necessary for the line's tight curves, but Hopton Incline imposed a severe limit as to what load could be hauled uphill, especially in wet or icy moorland conditions, when splitting trains down to two wagons at a time was not rare.

Passenger services ran up and down the incline from 1833 to 1876. The line's rule book made it clear that passengers were not to stay on board on inclines, but this was not always observed. Loadings in this sparsely populated upland area were very light. Evidence of the forms of provision is patchy and inconsistent, with the clearest sources being anecdotal. Some horse-drawn provision appears to have been based on stage-coaches, with inside and outside provision similar to the 'Dandy' used on the service to Port Carlisle. Later, locomotive-hauled, passengers were accommodated by attaching a specially adapted guard's van to conventional goods trains; the adaptation consisted of putting some seating in the van's goods section. This was known on the line as a "Fly", though the term appears to have been used interchangeably to mean the vehicle and the train.

Passenger traffic was light and general goods was substantially less than the line's promoters foresaw, especially after the line was effectively bypassed in the 1860s then truncated in 1892. The sparsely populated, largely agricultural area surrounding the curve meant that coal was the only significant inflow and milk the only significant outflow, except for the one traffic which dominated all – stone products, notably limestone and burnt lime. This traffic grew, and kept the line through the incline open despite its many operating obstacles, of which the incline was but one. Towards the end the incline's significance grew, as quarrying processes became more efficient and rail sought higher payloads the light trains of four-wheels-only limitations kept trains short and composed of small, slow-moving, obsolescent and uneconomic wagons. There was one other traffic, a 19th-century relic, whereby the line carried water. Limestone uplands drain naturally, so despite the high rainfall water supply to outlying properties was a problem. Some railway properties needed water, the railway itself needed water and in the 1960s Prestwich Intake Quarry needed water, so it was carried on trains using specially adapted former locomotive tenders.

On 6 October 1937, the 8:35 am freight train going from Middleton to Parsley Hay derailed while running chimney first at the foot of the Hopton Incline. Traveling at a speed of around 45 mph (72 km/h) and consisting of four laden wagons and a 20-ton brake van, the engine, three of the wagons, and the brake van were impelled down a 25 ft (7.6 m) embankment, coming to rest on a public road. The fourth wagon remained on the embankment, running off on the opposite side of the track.

== Closure ==
By the 1960s, rail services on the line has almost become exclusively block trains from local quarries. These freight services slowly decreased further during the Beeching cuts. In 1963 the rope-worked 1 in 8 Middleton Incline became the first section of the Cromford and High Peak line to closed. This was then followed by the Middleton Top-Friden section, including the 1 in 8 Sheep Pasture Incline and the Hopton Incline, which closed on 21 April 1967. The final section was between Friden Goods Yard and Hindlow which closed on 2 October 1967.

== Preservation ==
In 1971 the Peak Park Planning Board and Derbyshire County Council bought the track bed from the site of Hurdlow station, near Buxton, through the Hopton Incline to High Peak Junction, near Cromford and turned it into the High Peak Trail, which is now National Route 54 of the National Cycle Network. The trail is popular with walkers, cyclists and horse riders.

The High Peak Trail is also designated as part of the Pennine Bridleway, a leisure route that starts at Middleton Top, not far from the incline, and covers 73 miles (117 km) through Derbyshire to the South Pennines.

The incline was dramatic in railway terms. As part of an off-road trail it catches the public's eye, but not with the same impact as rope-hauled inclines, embankments, machinery, buildings and scenery. The adjacent road also diminishes the impact except for people "in the know". It is, nevertheless, preserved for all to enjoy.

== See also ==
- Hopton, Derbyshire
- Cromford and High Peak Railway
- Cromford
- British Rail
