= Listed buildings in Middleton-by-Wirksworth =

Middleton-by-Wirksworth is a civil parish in the Derbyshire Dales district of Derbyshire, England. The parish contains six listed buildings that are recorded in the National Heritage List for England. All the listed buildings are designated at Grade II, the lowest of the three grades, which is applied to "buildings of national importance and special interest". The parish contains the village of Middleton-by-Wirksworth and the surrounding area, and the listed buildings consist of houses, cottages and associated structures, a milestone and a church.

== Buildings ==
Name and location	Photograph	Date	Notes
2 and 3 New Road; 53.10178°N 1.58982°W		Late 17th or early 18th century	A pair of stone houses with a tile roof. There are two storeys and four bays. On the front are two doorways, one with a gabled hood, and the windows are small-paned with plain surrounds.
13 Main Street; 53.09871°N 1.58692°W	—	Early 18th century	A stone house with a slate roof, coped gables and kneelers. There are three storeys and three bays. In the centre is a doorway with moulded pilasters, and a cornice hood on consoles. The windows are two-light mullioned casements, the window to the left of the doorway with a relieving arch.
10 and 11 Rise End; 53.09415°N 1.58352°W	—	c. 1800	A pair of limestone cottages with gritstone dressings, quoins, and a Welsh slate roof with coped gables and kneelers. There are three storeys and three bays. The doorways and the windows, which are casements, have flush gritstone surrounds.
Railings and pier north of 13 Main Street; 53.09884°N 1.58695°W	—	Early 19th century	Along the front of the house is a stone retaining wall with wrought iron railings. At the end of the wall is a square stone pier with a cornice cap and a ball finial.
Milestone; 53.09456°N 1.58318°W		Early 19th century	The milestone on the north side of Porter Lane has splayed sides, and is inscribed with the distances to Alfreton and Ashbourne.
Holy Trinity Church; 53.09808°N 1.58568°W		1837–38	The church was extended at the west end in 1925. It is in stone with a tile roof, and consists of a nave and chancel in one unit, and the added vestry at the west end. The whole church has embattled parapets, and the windows are in Perpendicular style with three lights and hood moulds. The vestry obscures the original doorway that has an arched opening and a coped pediment with a crucifix finial. Above the vestry is a four-light window, a clock face, and a bellcote on the gable apex.
