= NLR Class 75 =

Class of 30 British 0-6-0T locomotives

- LNWR No. 2875 at or near the former NLR's; Devons Road workshops
Type and origin
- Power type: Steam
- Designer: J. C. Park
- Builder: Bow works
- Build date: 1879–1905
- Total produced: 30
Specifications
- Configuration
  - Whyte: 0-6-0T
  - UIC: C nt
- Gauge: 4 ft 8 1/2 in (1,435 mm) standard gauge
- Driver dia.: 4 ft 4 in (1.321 m)
- Loco weight: 45.50 long tons (46.23 t; 50.96 short tons)
- Fuel type: Coal
- Boiler pressure: 160 psi (1.10 MPa)
- Cylinders: Two outside
- Cylinder size: 17 in × 24 in (432 mm × 610 mm)
- Valve gear: Stephenson
Performance figures
- Tractive effort: 18,140 lbf (80.7 kN)
Career
- Operators: NLR · LNWR · LMS · BR
- Power class: LMS: 1F
- Number in class: 1 January 1923: 30; 1 January 1948: 14
- Withdrawn: 1930–1960
- Disposition: One preserved, remainder scrapped

The North London Railway Class 75 is a class of 0-6-0T steam locomotive.

Thirty were built to a design by J. C. Park from 1879 to 1905. They were designed for shunting the NLR's docks and were very compact but powerful engines. This made them suitable later for transfer onto the Cromford and High Peak Railway in Derbyshire, and some were sent north. They worked there until they were displaced by J94 "Austerity" 0-6-0STs.

== Numbering ==
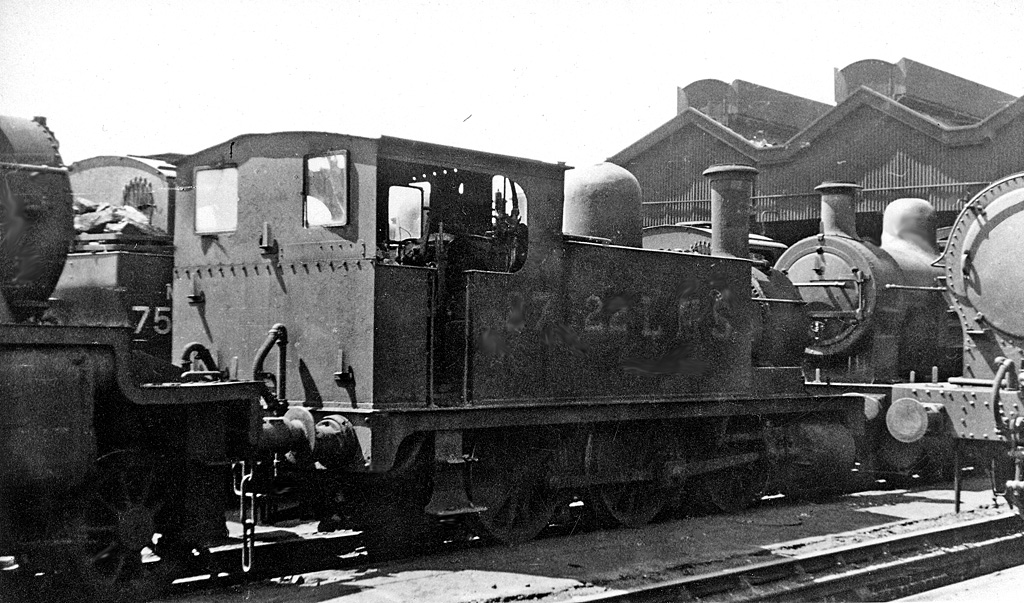
LMS No. 27522 at Birkenhead shed 1948

They were originally numbered 15–18, 61–66, 75–80, 91–95, 104, 107, 111, 115–116, 119, 121–123. In 1909 the nine locomotives numbered above 100 were transferred to the London and North Western Railway and renumbered in the 2600s. The remaining locomotives were also transferred at a later date and renumbered in the 2800s. All passed to the London, Midland and Scottish Railway on grouping, and were renumbered 7503–7532. In 1934 the surviving engines were renumbered by adding 20,000 to their numbers. In 1948 the 14 surviving engines passed to British Railways on nationalisation and were renumbered 58850–58863.

== Preservation ==
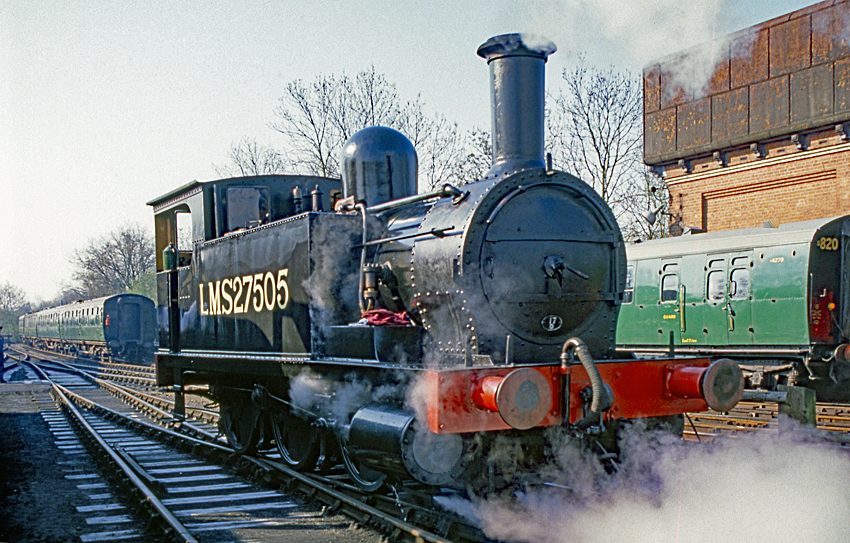
LMS 27505 0-6-0T at Sheffield Park in 1991

One, BR 58850 (ex LMS 27505, LMS 7505, LNWR 2650, NLR 116) – the last of the class to be withdrawn, in 1960 – has been preserved and has run on the Bluebell Railway. However as of 2017 it is stored at Sheffield Park shed awaiting overhaul.
