= Whatstandwell railway station =

Railway station in Derbyshire, England

Coordinates: 53.0832°N 1.5041°W

Whatstandwell
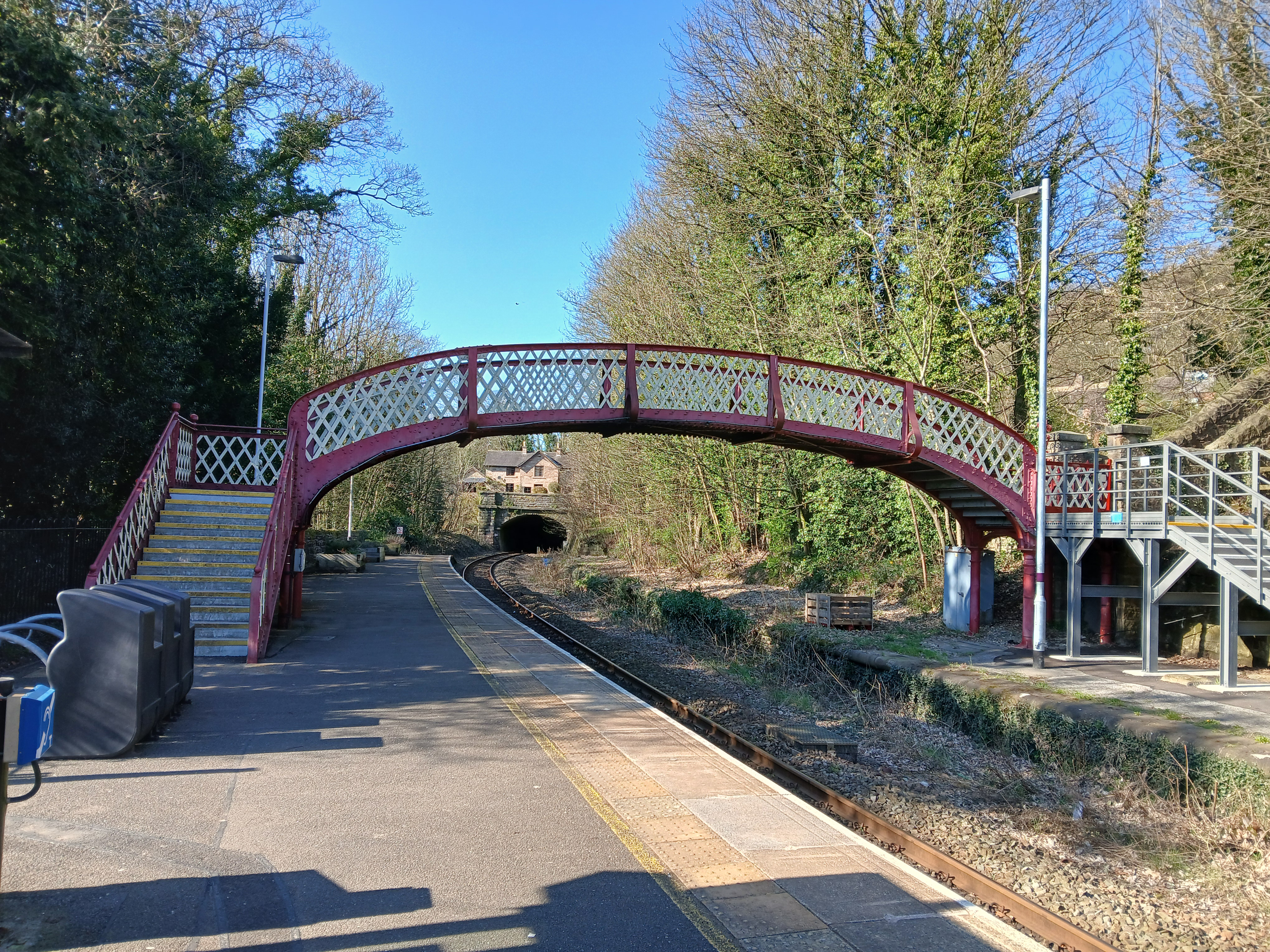

General information
- Location: Whatstandwell, Derbyshire Dales; England
- Grid reference: SK333541
- Manager: East Midlands Railway
- Platforms: 1

Other information
- Station code: WTS
- Classification: DfT category F2

Key dates
- 4 June 1849: opened
- 11 November 1894: resited

Passengers
- 2021/22: ▲21,264
- 2022/23: ▲24,948
- 2023/24: ▲25,488
- 2024/25: ▲28,430
- 2025/26: ▲29,690
Location
Notes
- Passenger statistics from the Office of Rail and Road

Whatstandwell railway station serves the villages of Whatstandwell and Crich Carr in Derbyshire, England. It is a stop on the Derwent Valley line, which runs between Derby and Matlock. The station is owned by Network Rail and managed by East Midlands Railway.

It is the nearest station to the National Tramway Museum at Crich; there is a steep uphill walk of about 1 mile (1.6 km) from the station to the museum.

== History ==
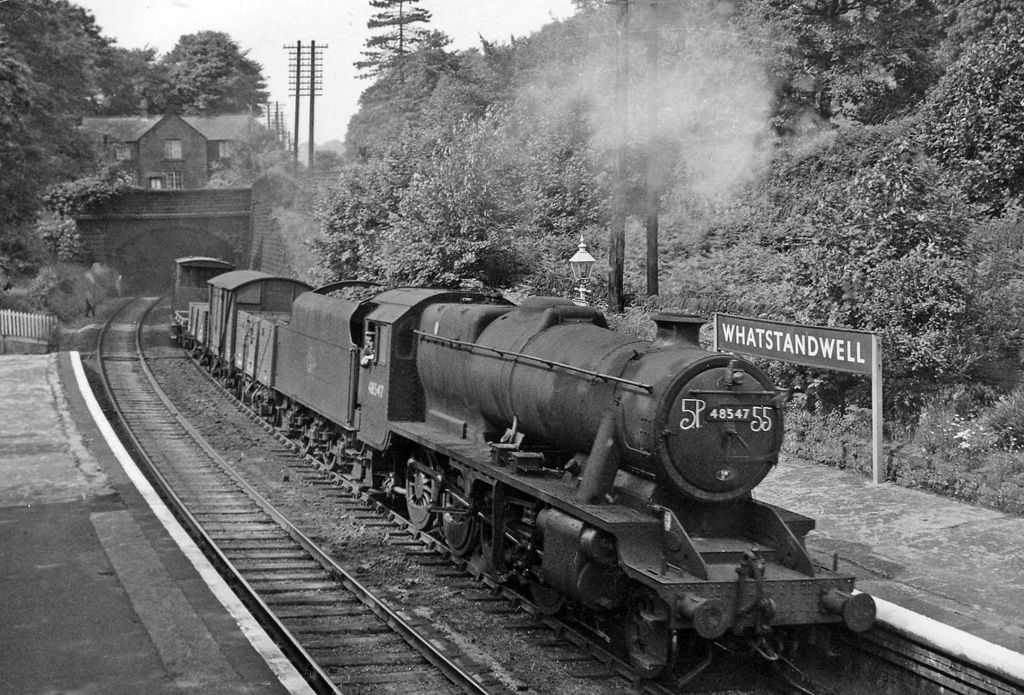
An up freight in 1961

The station was opened by the Manchester, Buxton, Matlock and Midland Junction Railway as Whatstandwell Bridge on 4 June 1849, though it was not listed in the timetable until 1853. It was north of the 149-yard (136 m) Whatstandwell Tunnel, behind the Derwent Hotel.

The station was moved to its present location in 1894, when its name became Whatstandwell; the platform at the original station still exists. The area was used as a goods yard after the present station was built. The contractor for the new station was W.C. Hardy of Derby. The new station opened on 11 November 1894.

A little way north was High Peak Junction, at the base of the former rope-worked incline of the Cromford and High Peak Railway.

=== Incidents ===
On 4 October 1853, a luggage train was on its way from Rowsley to Ambergate; at Whatstandwell, it was put into a siding to collect some empty wagons. It derailed and a breakdown crew was sent for from Derby. With this assistance, the train was re-railed and set off for Ambergate. The breakdown train, which had come from Derby, was standing on the wrong line for returning to Derby. Instead of continuing for 1/2 mile (0.8 km) to cross onto the correct line, they were determined to return to Derby on the wrong line, calculating that they would get back before anything started out from Derby. They ignored the rules of the company which required a fireman walking 800 yards (732 m) in advance of the train and proceeding at a walking pace; instead, they travelled at full speed.

They collided with another engine and Michael Barker, a fireman, was killed. Samuel Kent, George Cawood and John Smeeton were indicted for his manslaughter. They were found guilty at the Midland Assizes on 18 March 1854. Kent was sentenced by Lord Chief Justice Jervis to 18 months’ imprisonment and hard labour; the others were given 12 months each.

== Facilities ==
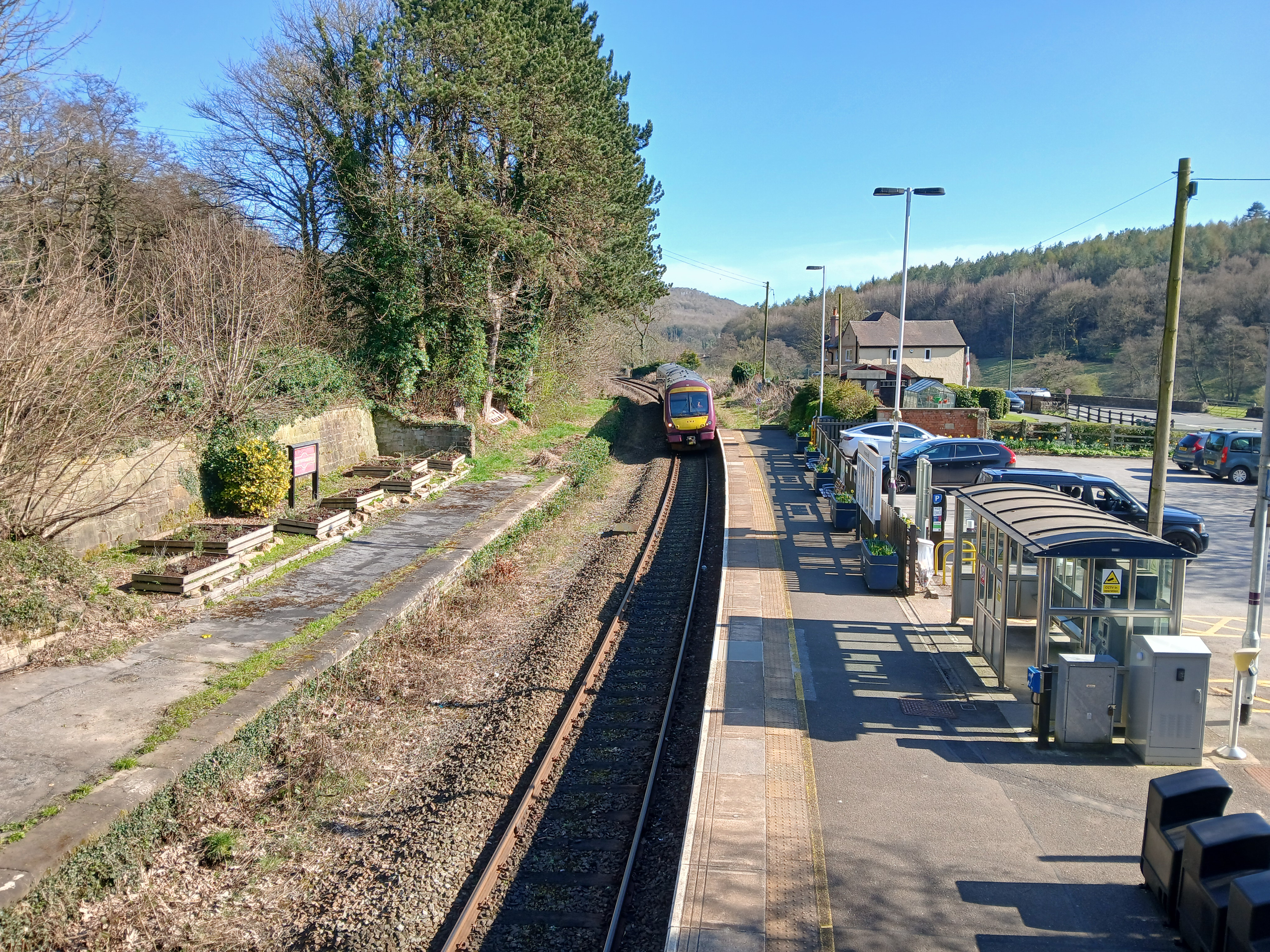
Whatstandwell station, with a passenger service approaching from Nottingham

The station has a single platform, which has direct access from the station car park and the A6 road. Additionally, a footbridge crosses the railway line and gives access to the Cromford Canal towpath and to a bridge over the canal to Main Road, the village and the National Tramway Museum.

There is a shelter and ticket machine on the platform. There is no ticket office or toilets and the station is generally unstaffed. The station is in a penalty fare zone and a ticket must be purchased before boarding the train.

A team of volunteers from the village helps to maintain the station and car park.

== Service ==
All services at Whatstandwell are operated by East Midlands Railway using Class 170 diesel multiple units.

The typical off-peak service is one train per hour in each direction to and from Matlock and Lincoln, via Derby, Nottingham and Newark Castle with one train every two hours extending to Cleethorpes.

Preceding station	National Rail	Following station
Ambergate	East Midlands Railway Derwent Valley line	Cromford
