= Middleton-by-Wirksworth =

Village and civil parish in Derbyshire Dales, Derbyshire, England

Coordinates: 53.1009°N 1.5885°W

Middleton
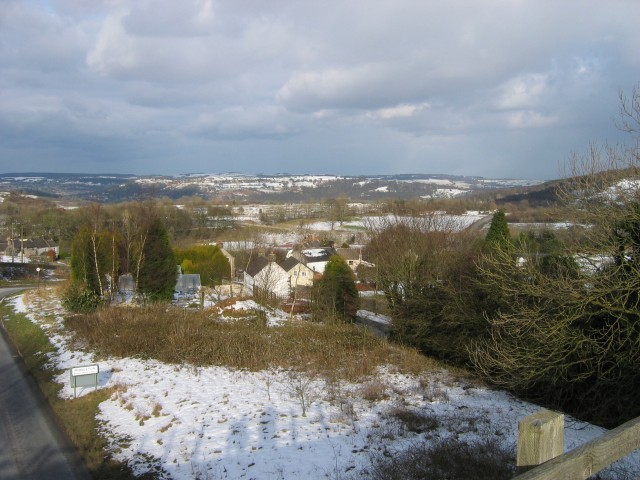
- View of the eastern end of Middleton village, from the High Peak Trail

- Location within Derbyshire
- Population: 775 (2011)
- OS grid reference: SK277559
- Civil parish: Middleton
- District: Derbyshire Dales
- Shire county: Derbyshire
- Region: East Midlands
- Country: England
- Sovereign state: United Kingdom
- Post town: MATLOCK
- Postcode district: DE4
- Dialling code: 01629
- Police: Derbyshire
- Fire: Derbyshire
- Ambulance: East Midlands
- UK Parliament: Derbyshire Dales

Middleton or Middleton-by-Wirksworth is an upland village and civil parish lying approximately one mile NNW of Wirksworth, Derbyshire, England. Middleton was, in 1086, a berewick (a supporting farm) of the town and manor of Wirksworth. Middleton was formerly known for its lead mines and high quality limestone quarries, including the underground quarry site at Middleton Mine. The Middleton Mine networks underground for approximately 25 miles (40 km) with tunnels on three different levels running under Middleton Moor to the Hoptonwood Quarry works at the other side of the hill below Ryder Point Works’. Part of the tunnel collapsed in the 1970s leaving a noticeable depression in the ground above on the eastern side of Middleton Moor. The population of the parish as taken at the 2011 Census was 775.

The attraction towards Middleton becoming a village had much to do with the fact that it is one of the few Derbyshire villages in the limestone area that has a ‘perched’ water table due to the impervious volcanic rock and shale formations within its topology. The availability of water was the incentive behind it becoming a choice of settlement. Middleton formed originally in the Saxon times as a small farming hamlet which settled around a very high spring.

The former Cromford and High Peak Railway passes close by the village. The local quarries were linked to this line by a short branch spur, Killer's Branch, part of which now forms the track bed of the Steeple Grange Light Railway. The branch line was operational until the late 1960s.

In the 1970s, the disused track bed of the Cromford and High Peak Railway and some surrounding land were purchased by the Derbyshire County Council and the Peak Park Planning Board, who then worked collaboratively to turn the former railway into the 17-mile (27 km) High Peak Trail for walkers and cyclists. Middleton Top lies near the southern end of the trail, which starts at High Peak Junction. There is a car park and visitor centre at Middleton Top, where cycles may be hired.

Middleton Top Engine House (grid reference SK275552) houses a preserved steam engine formerly used to haul trains up the 700-yard (640 m) long 1-in-8 (12.5%) gradient of Middleton Incline. The engine, built by the Butterley Company of Ripley in 1829, still runs for demonstration purposes and is occasionally open to the public.

The northern part of the village on the west side of the main road out towards New Road is called 'The Hall' due to the location of the now demolished Middleton Hall.

The cold winter of 1947 combined with the exposed nature of Middleton meant that snow was present even during the summer following the heavy snowfall.

Middleton is dependent on the market town of Wirksworth for many of its services, such as its health centre, leisure centre, high school (the Anthony Gell School) and nearby shops, petrol and so on. The closest railway station to Middleton is Wirksworth on the Ecclesbourne Valley Railway.

== Literary connection ==
In 1918-19, D. H. Lawrence and his wife Frieda rented Mountain Cottage, which stands below the B5023 road on the NW side of village as the road descends towards the Via Gellia. Lawrence also reputedly spent time at Woodland Cottage (formerly known as The Woodlands) on the opposite side of New Road. While living in Middleton during the bitter winter of 1918-19, Lawrence wrote the short story A Wintry Peacock (published in 1921), which is set in the immediate locality.

== In popular culture ==
Middleton Mine has become filming location. Productions that have filmed here include Mission: Impossible – The Final Reckoning, and The Fantastic Four: First Steps (both 2025). The nearby Middle Peak Quarry was used to represent Narkina 5 in the Star Wars television programme Andor.

== See also ==
- Listed buildings in Middleton-by-Wirksworth
