= High Peak Trail =

Bridleway in the English Peak District

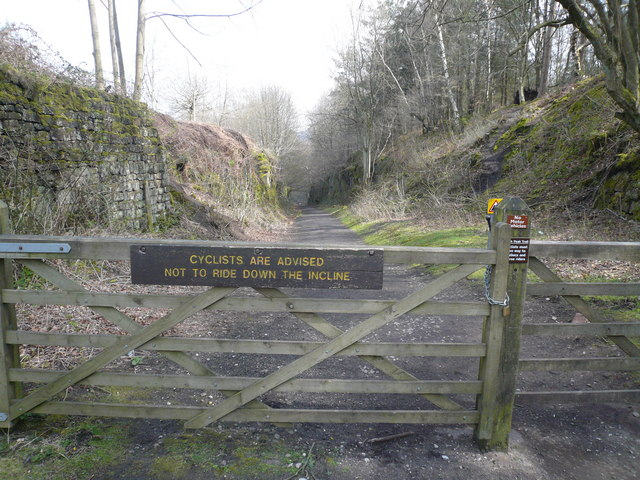
Looking down Sheep Pasture Incline

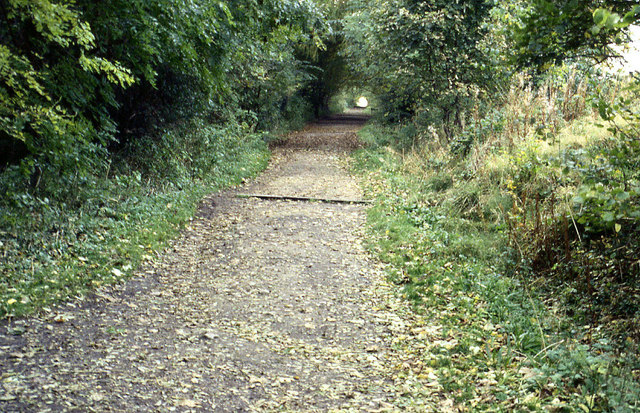
The trail at Middleton Incline

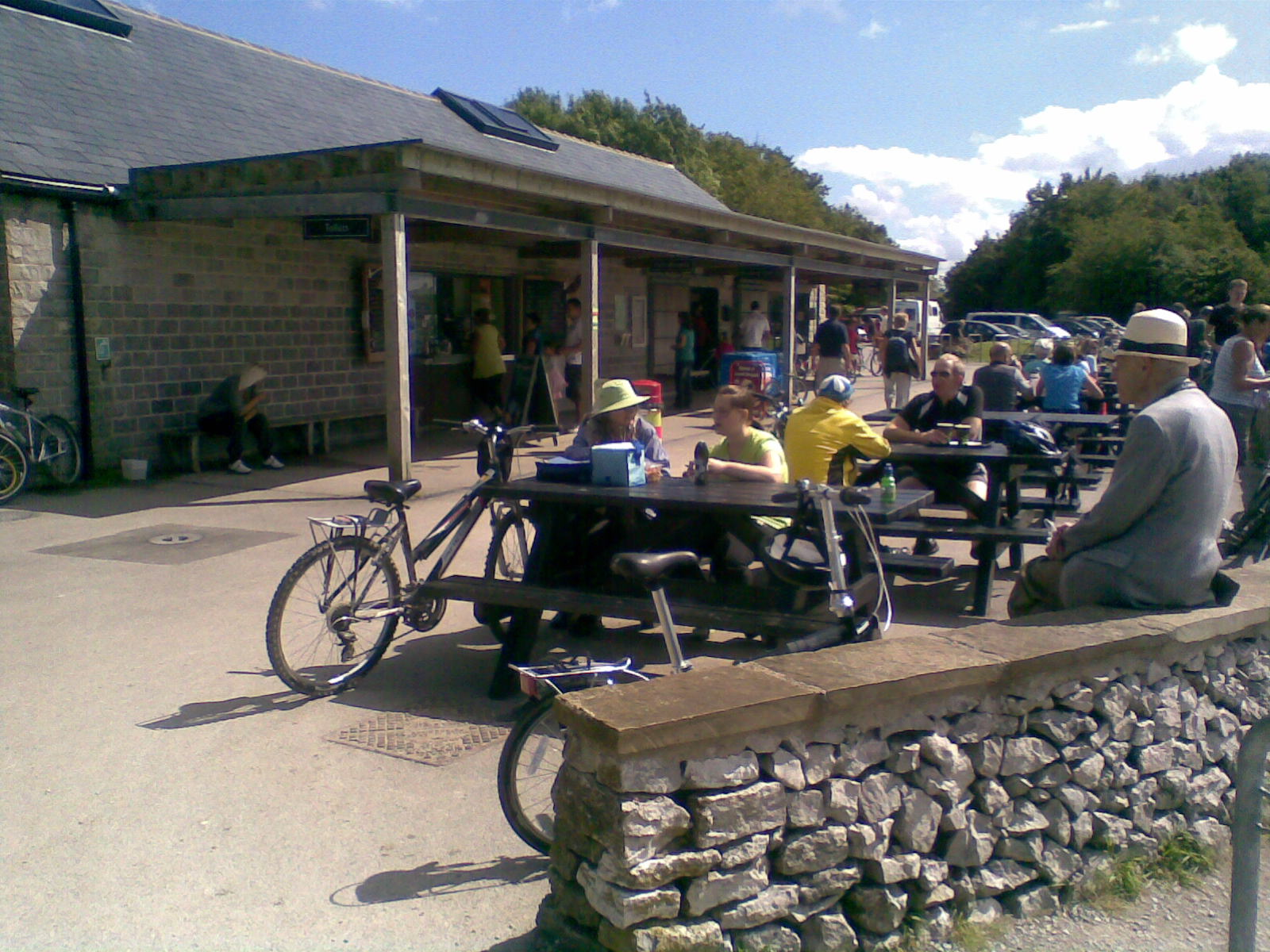
The cycle-hire centre at Parsley Hay on a busy August weekend

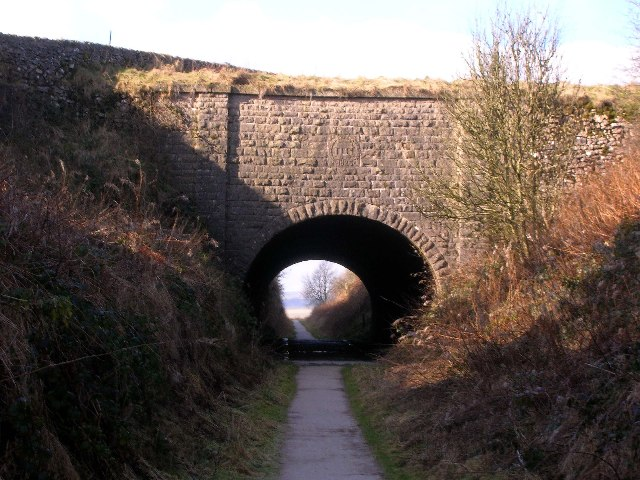
The trail passing under the A515 at Newhaven Tunnel

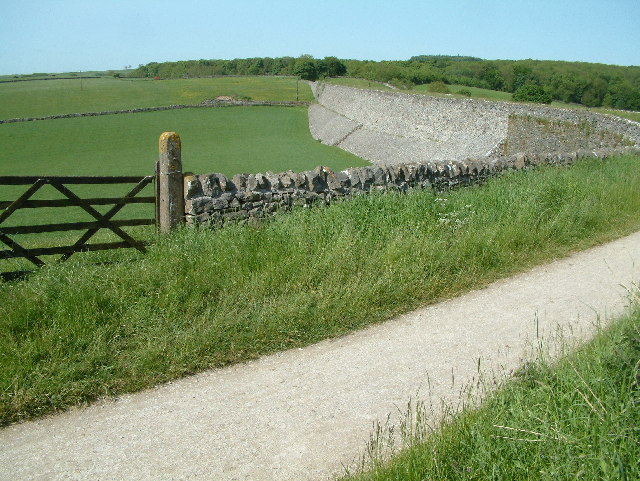
The trail at Minninglow

The High Peak Trail is a 17-mile (27 km) trail for walkers, cyclists and horse riders in the Peak District of England. Running from Dowlow (53.2059°N 1.8349°W), near Buxton, to High Peak Junction, Cromford (53.1004°N 1.5354°W), it follows the trackbed of the former Cromford and High Peak Railway, which was completed in 1831 to carry minerals and goods between the Cromford Canal wharf at High Peak Junction and the Peak Forest Canal at Whaley Bridge.

Closure of the line occurred during the Beeching era, with the first section of the line closing in 1963 (i.e. the Middleton Incline) followed by full closure in 1967.

In 1971 the Peak Park Planning Board and Derbyshire County Council bought the largest part of the trackbed and, in partnership with the Countryside Commission, adapted it for its current leisure use. The trail has a crushed limestone surface which makes it ideal for all users, including wheelchair use, assisted by level access onto the trail at various points along its route.

The High Peak Trail is now a national route of the National Cycle Network.

The elevated nature of the trail (the highest part of the line is at Ladmanlow, at a height of 1,266 ft or 386 m) affords many splendid views across the countryside. However, these higher sections can also be very exposed in poor weather. The original railway incorporated a number of inclines at its northern and southern ends, and whilst much of the trail is fairly level, these sections are naturally steeper.

At Parsley Hay, about 5 miles (8 km) southwest of Bakewell, the High Peak Trail is joined by the 13-mile (21 km) Tissington Trail, another route of the National Cycle Network, which was formerly the railway branch line to Ashbourne. The High Peak Trail crosses the Limestone Way near Harboro' Rocks.

The High Peak Trail (and part of the Tissington Trail) are also designated part of the Pennine Bridleway, a 130-mile (210 km) leisure route which starts at Middleton Top, near Cromford, and includes 73 miles (117 km) through Derbyshire to the South Pennines. The Trail also forms part of the Midshires Way, a long-distance footpath and bridleway which runs for 225 miles (362 km) through the Midlands from Bledlow to Stockport.

The High Peak Trail forms part of the White Peak Loop Trail, a 60-mile (97 km) route for walking, cycling and horse riding in the Peak District. It links the High Peak Trail with the Monsal Trail, with linking sections through the towns of Buxton, Bakewell and Matlock. The White Peak Loop is being developed by Derbyshire County Council and as of 2020 some sections are not yet complete.

== Access and facilities on the trail ==
- At Hurdlow (map ref. SK128659), at the northern end of the trail, there is parking and level access onto the trail. Picnic tables are provided.
- At Parsley Hay (map ref. SK146637), where the trail is joined by the Tissington Trail, there is direct access from the car park to the trail. Facilities include toilets, a picnic site, visitor information, and cycle hire.
- At Friden (map ref. SK172607) there is a car park giving level access onto the trail. There is a picnic table.
- At Minninglow (map ref. SK194581) there is a car park and picnic site, with level access onto the trail.
- At Middleton Top there is a visitor centre, with car park and toilets. Cycles can also be hired here.
- At Black Rocks there is a car park, toilets, and shop for light refreshments.
- At High Peak Junction there is a Visitor Centre and shop. Light refreshments can be purchased and there are picnic tables outside. Lea Road car park, over the river, is accessible by footbridge.
- Nearby is the National Stone Centre, Wirksworth.

== See also ==
- Cromford and High Peak Railway
- Tissington Trail
