= High Peak Junction =

Coordinates: 53.1002°N 1.5334°W

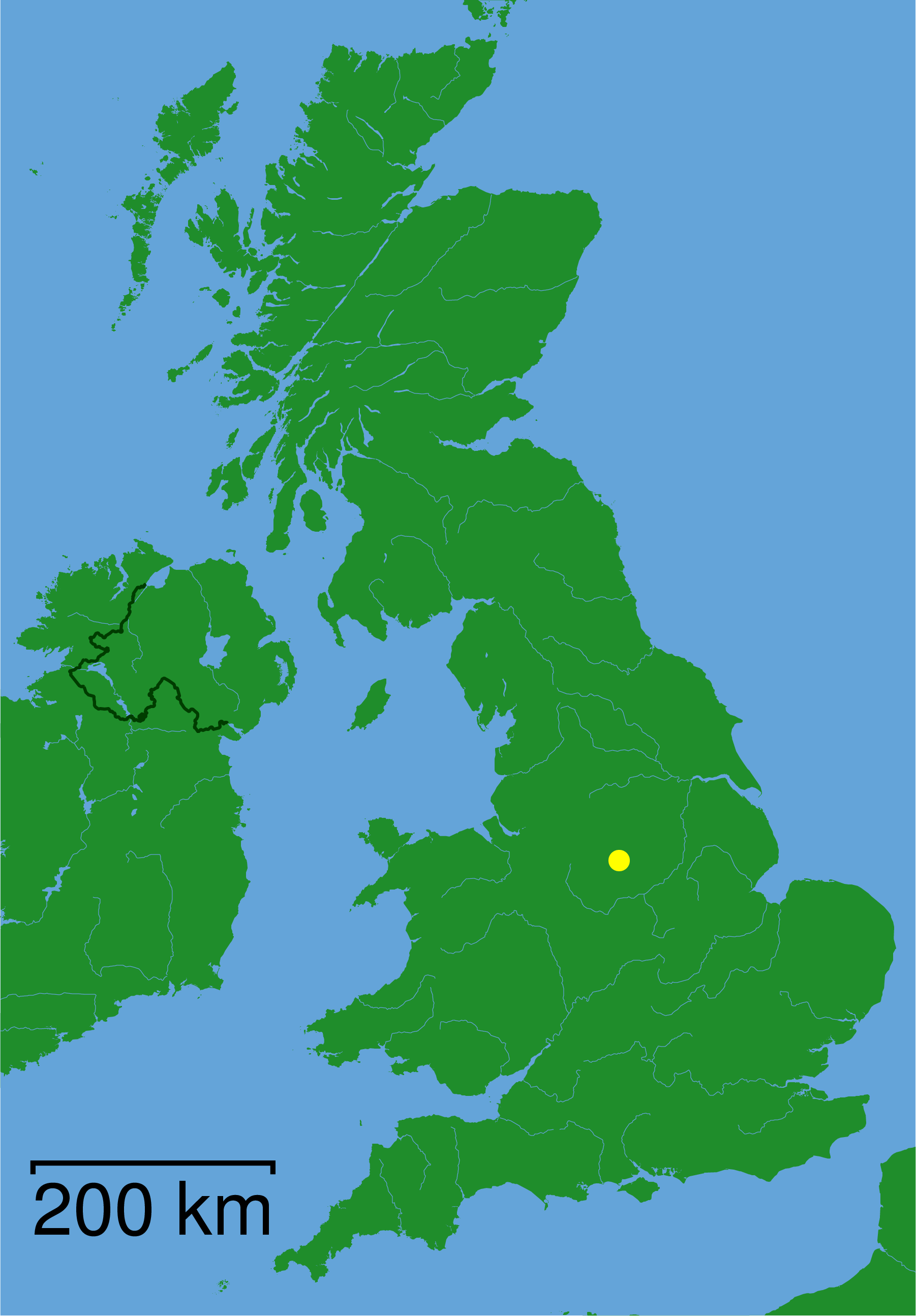
Location of High Peak Junction in Derbyshire, England

High Peak Junction, near Cromford, Derbyshire, England, is the name now used to describe the site where the former Cromford and High Peak Railway (C&HPR), whose workshops were located here, meets the Cromford Canal. It lies within Derwent Valley Mills World Heritage Site, designated in 2001, and today marks the southern end of the High Peak Trail, a 17 miles (27 km) trail for walkers, cyclists and horse riders. The Derwent Valley Heritage Way also passes this point, and popular walks lead from here along the towpath in both directions.

== History as part of the High Peak Railway ==
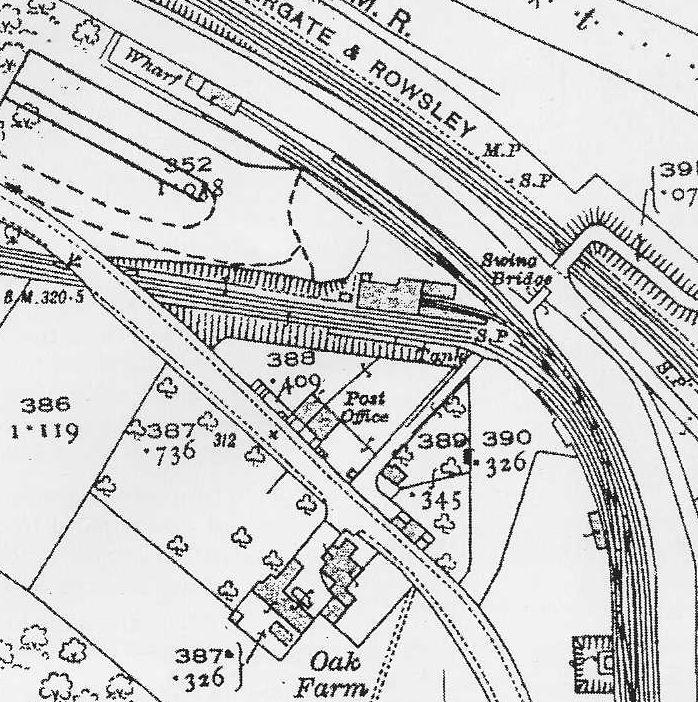
The site as shown on an old OS Map; the extremes of the map show the original northern wharf, and the southern weigh-house.

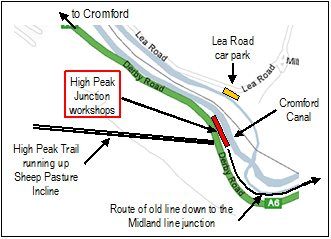
A diagram of High Peak Junction today.

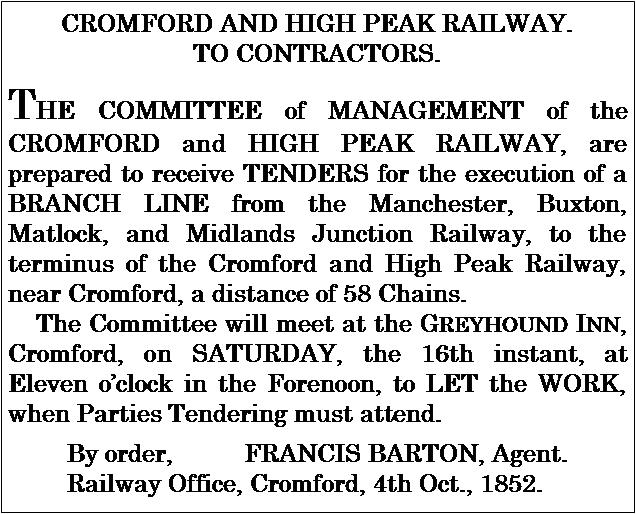
The advertisement placed for the construction of the branch line from the Midland Railway Junction to the canal-side site.

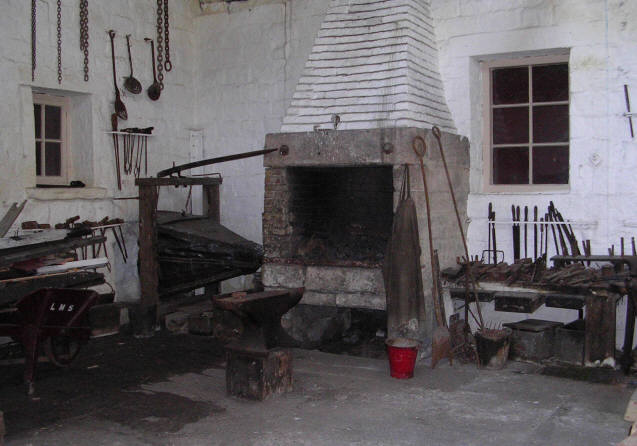
A view inside the old workshop, showing the forge.

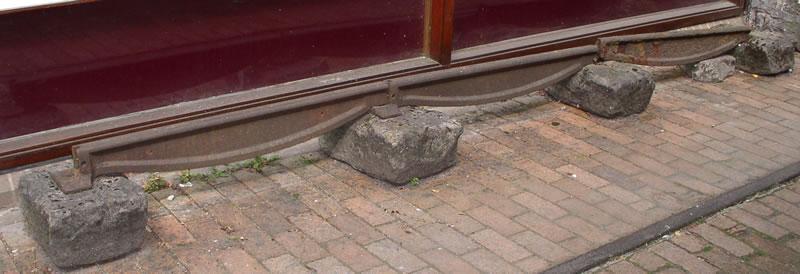
Specimen fish-belly rail laid on stone blocks.

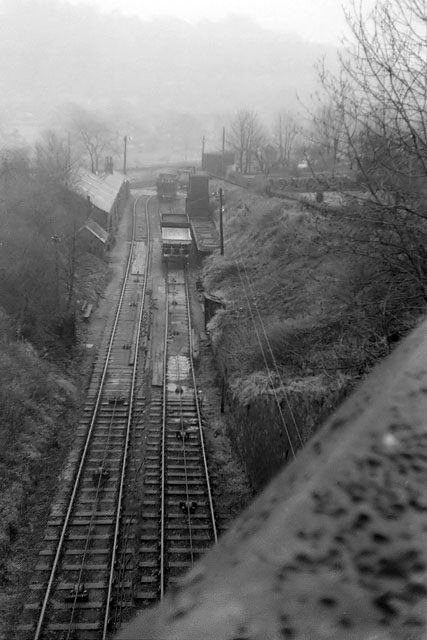
A 1966 view from the A6 bridge down the lower part of Sheep Pasture incline towards the wharf.

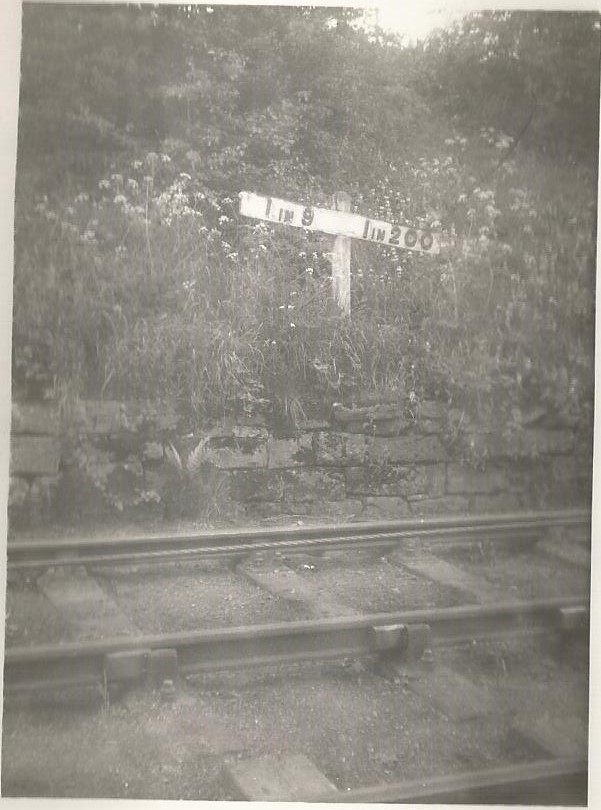
Gradient Post at the foot of Sheep Pasture Incline, Cromford and High Peak Railway, Derbyshire, England

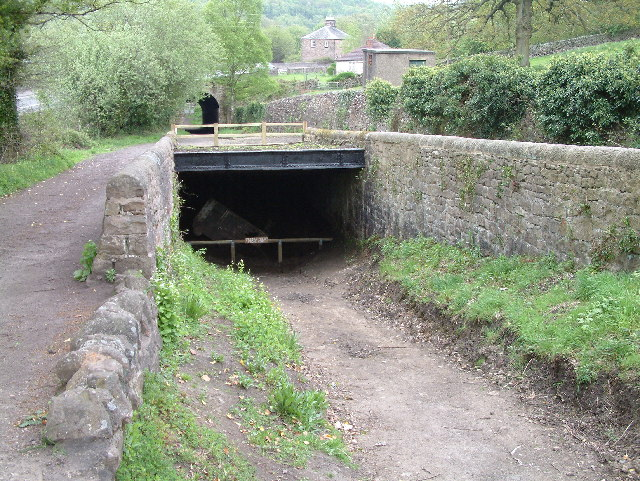
Immediately above the bridge is the Sheep Pasture catch-pit built to trap runaway wagons.

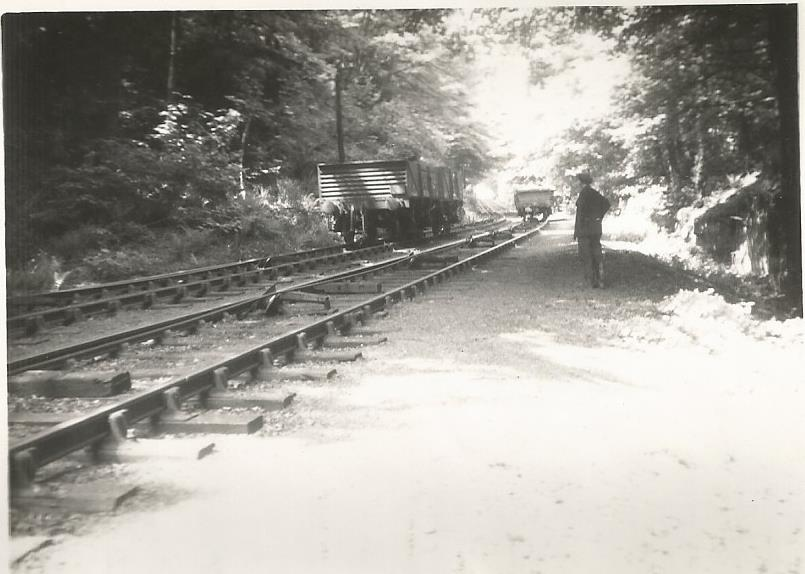
Rope-hauled wagons crossing near the mid-point of the incline in 1964

As first built, the C&HPR – built to standard gauge proportions after initial plans for it to be constructed as a canal route – originally terminated at this location, named in the original act of Parliament, the Cromford and High Peak Railway Act 1825 (6 Geo. 4. c. xxx), as "beside the Cromford Canal, at or near to Cromford", where freight was transferred between canal barges and railway wagons. The large wharf-side transit shed, with awning over the canal, still stands on the west bank of the canal, a small distance from the workshop complex. From here the double-tracked line ran beside the workshops and up the steep Sheep Pasture incline. Prior to the construction of this larger transit shed, use was made of another shed the other side of the workshops, which opened onto the river. This later became a locomotive shed, but has now been demolished, and lies beyond the picnic area.

This first section of the line, from here to Hurdlow, opened on 29 May 1830, opening throughout in 1831. At this point in time the railway was isolated from any other railway lines, being connected only to canals at either end, namely the Cromford Canal in the south, and the Peak Forest Canal at Whaley Bridge in the north. Cromford Canal had previously been finished in 1794 and linked Sir Richard Arkwright’s mills to the national waterway system.

The workshop complex here was largely built between 1826 and 1830 (making them the second oldest railway workshops in the world), specifically to serve the new line. There were also limited sidings here. The endless chains for the inclines, for instance, were made here from ¾ inch chain apparently supplied by Pritt & Co of Liverpool.

At the time of the railway's opening, apart from on the inclines, horses were the main form of power, and only minerals and goods were carried. These goods, which included coal, were primarily for local communities along the route. The carriage of limestone also played a predominant part, for this mineral was required in the manufacture of steel, and was found in abundance in this upland area.

Initially static steam engines powered the inclines, but in 1833 the first locomotive was acquired for the line, and as such was one of the country's earliest railways, coming only seven years after George Stephenson's Stockton and Darlington Railway had opened. It was to take 30 years before all horse motive-power was replaced by steam, but whilst there were engines on the line, water wagons had to be carried up the inclines from the wharf, for use by the stationary engines, and later by the locomotives, and for supply at isolated properties. There were over 20 rail tanks in total, many converted LNWR tenders, despatched from the wharf at a rate of about 100 a month and left in sidings along the route. Water was sparse up the line, but here at the wharf a hillside spring fed a tank which was located at Sheep Pasture bottom, across the line from the workshops. Apart from repairing wagons and locomotives, the company stock list records that in 1859 two locomotives were built at the workshops, but in reality they were more likely assembled here, for from 1840 parts were being bought from the Union Foundry in Derby.

However, the railway was initially only a link in the canal network, and isolated from other railway lines. It terminated here at its southern end, and it was not until two decades later that physical connection was made with any main line, eliminating its dependence for trade on the canal. This connection was with the Manchester, Buxton, Matlock and Midland Junction Railway at a point between Cromford and Whatstandwell stations (now on the Derwent Valley line). This was strictly the "High Peak Junction", this name not being used for this canal-side site until after closure of the line. (See below.)

The new main line Midland Railway junction was brought into use on 21 February 1853, increasing the length of the C&HPR by 58 chains (about ¾ mile), and Bradshaw's Railway Manual of 1870 describes the whole undertaking as now running "from Peak Forest Canal to the Cromford Canal, and to a junction with the Manchester, Buxton, Matlock and Midlands Junction". However, it took another decade before horse power on the High Peak Railway was entirely replaced by steam. Following this connection, and the development of the Midland Line through to Manchester, more and more traffic took this route. Tonnage rates on the canal were lowered to attract trade, but competition was fierce, not helped by the eventual selling of the Cromford Canal to the railway company in 1852. A second collapse of the Butterley tunnel (2,966 yd (1.685 mi)) in 1900 – due to mining subsidence – rang the final death knell for the canal as an effective mode of transport. However, coal was still carried on this isolated section from Hartshay to Lea and Cromford until 1944, when the whole canal was officially abandoned.

Beside the transit shed a road crossed the junction extension line at an ungated crossing. A red iron plate on a post was turned 90 degrees to indicate "stop" to either the road or the railway.

From 1862 LNWR officials made regular inspections of the railway, and an inspection in June of this year led to an attempt to find a larger workshop site than that here at Cromford. A level site at Ladmanlow, some 25 miles (40 km) along the line, was considered, but a report by Charles Mason the following month suggested only a small maintenance shop there. Given that 18 men were employed at Cromford, and that many of their children worked in Arkwright's mill, it was left here.

A timetable of 1874 showed some nine departures daily from the junction, although there was only one through train daily along the whole length of the line, a journey of some 5½ hours. Most of the others terminated at Hopton, but clearly all these workings passed through this Cromford wharf site.

High Peak Junction lies at the bottom of the steep Sheep Pasture incline (some 1,320 yd (0.75 mi) in length at a gradient varying between 1:8 and 1:9), and following a runaway in 1888 a catch pit was constructed, the two lines passing either side of it. In this accident (of which there are a number of varying versions), it would seem that a wagon loaded with lime and a brake van containing gunpowder broke free from a train, hurtling down the incline at speeds of up to 120 mph (190 km/h). Failing to take the bend at the bottom, they then ran across the site, jumping across both the canal (damaging the bank) and the double tracks of the Midland Railway before one of the canisters exploded in the adjacent field. Minutes later the London passenger train passed. Wreckage seen in the catch pit today dates from a further runaway in the 1950s.

The line prospered, and quarries were serviced at Hopton, Hoptonwood, Middleton Top & Longcliffe. Traffic was also generated at the Harboro Brick Works, Longliffe and the Derbyshire Firebrick Company at Friden.

Locomotives on the line were primarily sourced from Rowsley shed, but subsheds were also provided at Cromford, Middleton and Sheep Pasture. These provided both accommodation and routine minor maintenance, and provided for the section of line between High Peak Junction and Friden.

The Cromford and High Peak Railway Act 1855 (18 & 19 Vict. c. lxxv) provided powers to carry passengers, and this was done – on certain trains – using a brake van with seats. There was no proper timetable, but passengers could take advantage of the once-daily train which ran in both directions along the whole length of the 33-mile (53 km) line. Passengers were supposed to alight and walk up the inclines, but many risked the ride. A fatality in 1877 provided a reason to discontinue what was an unprofitable service.

- Some photos of locomotives operating at High Peak Junction and on the C&HPR can be seen here.
- Photos taken on the last day of operation, Sunday 30 April 1967, can be seen here.

== Alternative names for this site ==
As has been mentioned, although today the name High Peak Junction refers to the canal-side workshop complex at the foot of Sheep Pasture incline, during the operating life of the High Peak Railway the name "High Peak Junction" was officially that of the signal box and Junction with the Midland Railway main-line, which lay some ¾ mile away to the south-east. Consequently the name High Peak Junction sidings referred to that adjacent siding (See below.).

Over the years this workshop site has had various names:

On Ordnance Survey maps of 1880 and 1884 the site is labelled "Railwayend", as it was until the Junction line was built in 1852 (to canal users, the swing bridge at this point was known as Railwayend bridge). From at least 1900 onwards maps label this site "High Peak Junction" (or "Highpeak Junction"). It is so labelled on the 1899 edition of the 25" OS map (revised 1896), where the former term refers to the main line junction, while the latter refers to the wharf area. The 1884 edition of the 25" OS maps also shows a "Junction Inn" on the towpath side opposite the wharf, though by the 1899 edition this had disappeared due to a realignment of the main line.

A table dated 1891 detailing "Particulars of Gradients" for the line records "Bottom of Sheep Pasture" (ie. this being at the foot of the Sheep Pasture incline). This name was retained for that section of line beside the workshops and the signal, ie. where the brake wagons currently stand.

Jones and Bentley refer to Cromford Wharf of the C&HPR, whilst Rimmer, an authority on the railway, refers to the main site as Cromford Wharf, although today this name is used to refer to the original Wharf at the Canal end beside Cromford Mill, in Cromford. For this reason the name High Peak Wharf is also sometimes used.

The small goods yard and limited sidings to the north-west, beyond the workshops and parallel to the canal, were known as Cromford Goods. The Rule Book and timetables refer simply to Cromford. The 1900 O.S. Map marks Cromford Goods Wharf beside the transit shed.

An issue of Railway Magazine (1934) incorrectly refers to this site as Cromford Sidings, although this name was that used for the main line sidings at Cromford railway station.

The changing use of the name "High Peak Junction" still causes confusion today. For instance, in "Peak District Walking on the Level" (Sigma Press, 2006), whilst correctly stating that "the Cromford end of the (High Peak) railway was connected at High Peak Junction to the (Midland) main line", the author's diagram shows a direct link from here, the foot of Sheep Pasture incline, continuing directly over the canal to the adjacent mainline. The difference in height could never have allowed this.

== The signalbox and main line junction ==
Midland Railway plan showing the workshop at the base of the incline of the C&HPR and High Peak Junction south of Leawood Tunnel

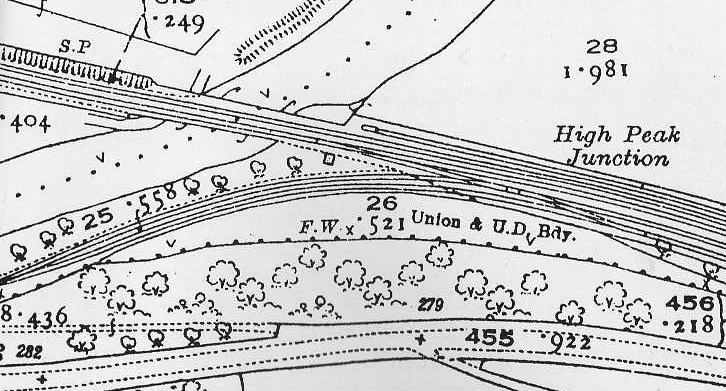
"High Peak Junction" with the Midland Railway, as shown on an old OS map.

There was no act of Parliament authorizing a branch line to connect the C&HPR to the Midland main line, but its construction and opening (on 21 February 1853) were confirmed in Section 6 of the Cromford and High Peak Railway Act 1855 (18 & 19 Vict. c. lxxv).

Construction of this branch line had followed a fair bit of argument as to who should finance it - the C&HPR or the Matlock (later Midland) Railway. The C&HPR ultimately agreed, on 19 January 1852, to build it at its own expense, but asked the Matlock Company for a siding at the junction, which was provided. Following an advertisement in the Derby Mercury on 6 October of that year, asking for tenders to construct this line, 58 chains long (see illustration), the contract was let on 16 October, and opened the following year, running along a shelf above and largely parallel to the river Derwent.

A description of 1934 states that:

"two exchange sidings are provided on the down side of the main line and from these the High Peak line turns off through the woods, on a rising gradient of 1 in 200, to Cromford Sidings [sic], at the foot of Sheep Pasture incline, which is a mile distant from the junction. The first 500 yards are worked as a siding, after which a staff section extends to the foot of the incline."

The 1858 Rulebook, replaced in 1877 by one issued by the LNWR, refers to Section 1 of the C&HPR (of 9 in total) being "High Peak Junction to Cromford", served by a square, black staff. Here, the name "High Peak Junction" refers to the actual junction with the main line, "Cromford" referring to the canal-side site.

A timetable of 1891 also uses this terminology, and shows a time of 10 minutes from Cromford to the Junction, with 20 minutes allowed in the uphill direction. This section was operated as OES, i.e. One Engine in Steam.

At the junction, looking north, the signal box was located to the right of the Main Line. At this point there were in fact 5 parallel tracks, comprising - from west to east - the "down siding" (used by the C&HPR, with room for 35 wagons), the "High Peak Branch" (the main C&HPR line, operated by separate staff), the up Main Line, the down Main Line, and the Up Loop. The siding here, together with the adjoining High Peak Railway main-line, was used for shunting wagons by the engine in this section, and was known as High Peak Junction sidings.

The length of double track comprising the C&HPR siding (essentially main lain and loop) provided only the most basic of facilities, and operating flexibility was limited. If ever a main line train failed to pick up loaded wagons (a booked operation), or if the High Peak shunter was slow to remove empties, the result was considerable congestion.

The High Peak Junction signal box, designated "D22", is described as being located "E (Up) side of line 140m S of Lea Wood river bridge", at grid reference 32306 55495. Distances to neighbouring locations were given as :

- "Cromford Sidings - 1mi 516yd"
- "Whatstandwell Sidings - 1485yd"
- "Cromford Goods (C&HP) - 1294yd".

The box closed in October 1967, and the foundations and a significant amount of timber still survives, including rear posts and cross beams. The steel tubed Up Home bracket signal has been cut off at its base, and is still lying where it fell - presumably for intended collection later - although the arms and dolls are missing. A line of telegraph poles still runs from Cromford Meadows to the Junction, between the River Derwent and the railway line, though the wires have long gone.

- A photo of a main line locomotive passing the C&HPR exchange sidings can be seen here
- A map of 1930 showing both sites - High Peak (main line) Junction and Cromford Goods - can be seen here.

== Closure to present ==
=== The High Peak Trail ===
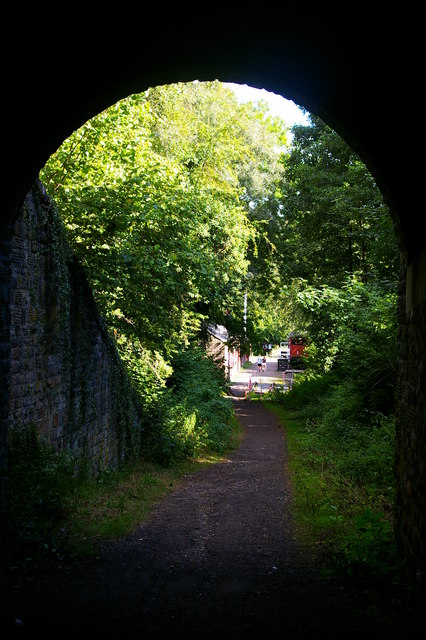
The start of the High Peak Trail - looking back down to High Peak Junction from the A6 tunnel.

The High Peak Railway closed fully in 1967, and in 1971 the Peak Park Planning Board and Derbyshire County Council purchased for £1 the trackbed from the High Peak Junction workshops as far as Parsley Hay, and it was turned it into the High Peak Trail. At Parsley Hay it is joined by the Ashbourne branch, now part of the Tissington Trail, another long-distance walking/cycle trail, and the route continues northwards to Dowlow near Buxton, a total distance of 17½ miles.

The section of line from the workshops down to the original junction, although part of the C&HPR, was not purchased - although it remains a right of way - and High Peak Junction, beside the Cromford Canal, is therefore the southern start point of the High Peak Trail, from where it heads immediately uphill, passing through the tunnel and up Sheep Pasture incline towards Black Rocks and Middleton Top, from where cycles can be hired.

=== The site today ===
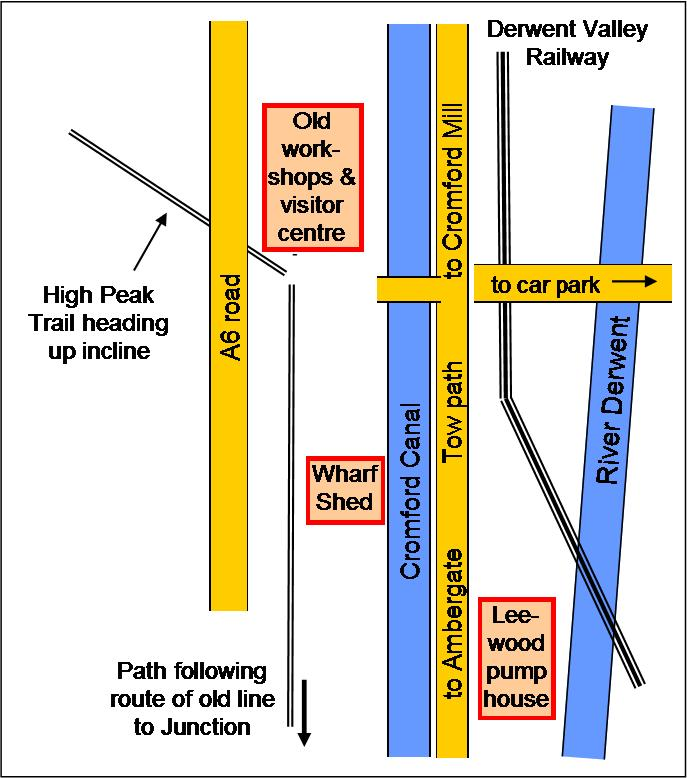
A schematic diagram of the site today.

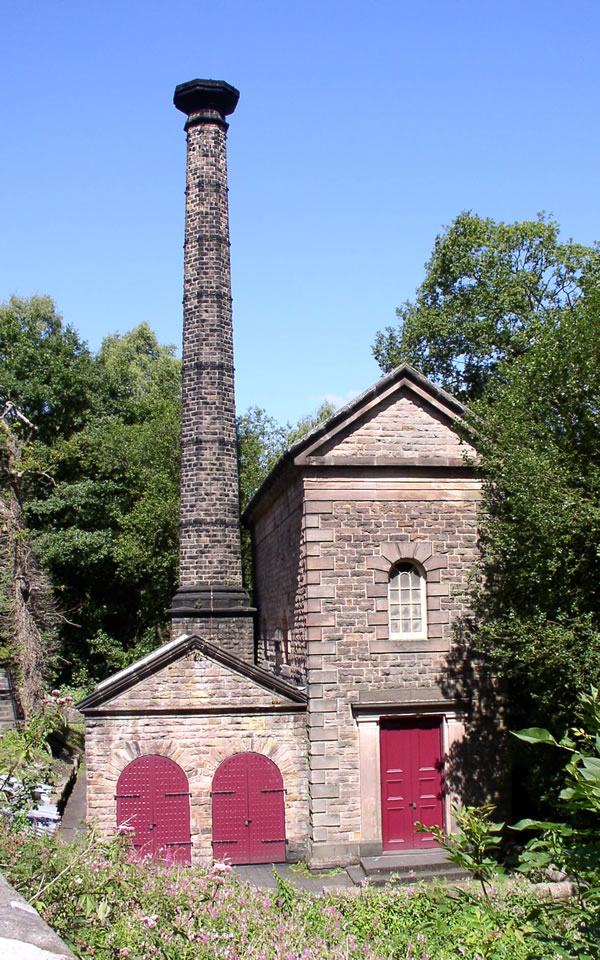
Nearby is Leawood pump house.

Most of the railway buildings remains, namely offices and the old workshops where the early locomotives were built and serviced, and where water tanks were repaired. Beside the transit shed there is also the engine shed where the yard shunting engine resided. In 1985 the railway workshops and forge were restored and opened to the public, and there is also an information centre, shop and small cafe for visitors. An audio guide of the site is available. The shop today is located in what was one of the offices, and the oil and lamp store. The room on the end was the drivers' mess room.

Beyond what is now the picnic site there was once an engine shed (a former transit shed), used to house the locomotive used between here and the mainline junction. Opposite the old signal post was once a large water tank, used to fill the tenders which were then taken up the incline.

In the workshops much remains virtually unchanged since closure, with many items on display in the way of artifacts, and a leaflet to help identify them (although some items of equipment are so rare that the Visitors Guide admits that it has not been possible to identify them all). It is possible that the cast iron, fish-bellied rails on either side of the inspection pit form the oldest length of railway line in the world still in its original position. Other items of particular interest, as indicated in the Visitors Guide, include a drill, chain bays, an old photograph, line tools, the forge and bellows, beam engine parts, a joiner's bench, and an oil tank.

The former C&HPR agent's house can be seen next to the A6 above.

Some 1/4 mile from the workshops and other railway buildings stands the canal-side Wharf Shed (the former transit shed), the 10-ton crane, and the weighhouse, the Shed itself being of major historical significance. Wagons could pass right through to the canopied area beyond. A sign prohibiting engines from entering the shed - there are timber beams and floors - is still displayed. Now owned by Derbyshire County Council, the Wharf Shed was converted to a residential centre in the early 1970s. It is available for hire to schools, youth and adult community groups, with room for groups of up to 24 people. Note that "Cromford Wharf Shed" is here, not at the Canal terminus by Cromford Mill, now known as Cromford Wharf.

A 6-mile (9.7 km) long section of the Cromford canal between Cromford and Ambergate is listed as a Biological Site of Special Scientific Interest (SSSI), and also forms part of the Derwent Valley Heritage Way.

Another adjacent attraction is Leawood Pump House, built to pump water from the river Derwent in order to maintain the water level in the Cromford canal. Originally conceived in 1844 following a very dry summer, the Pumphouse became operational in 1849.

The whole site at High Peak Junction is easily accessed from the large public car-park at Lea Bridge, in Lea Road, from where a footbridge crosses the river Derwent, the railway, and the canal.

From High Peak Junction walkers can follow the level canal tow-path in both directions, or take the High Peak Trail up the incline.

== Gallery ==
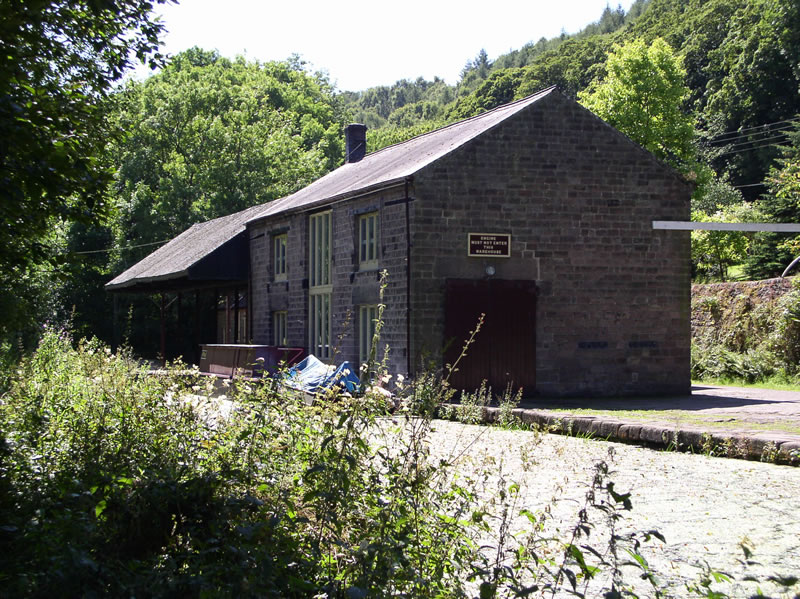
The canal-side Wharf Shed at High Peak Junction, a little distance from the workshops. The awning overhangs the canal.

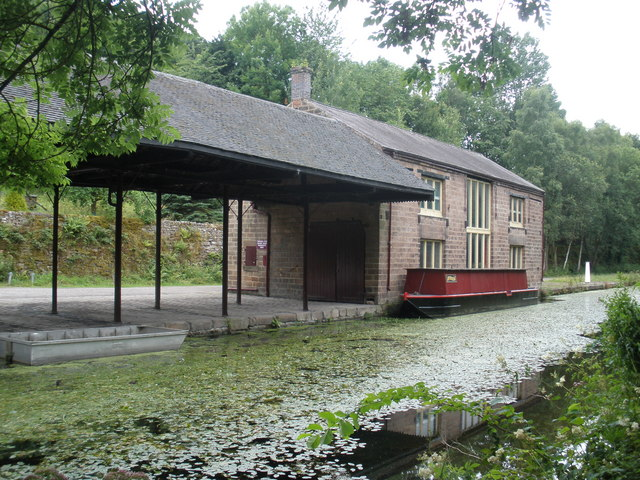
Another good view of the transit shed

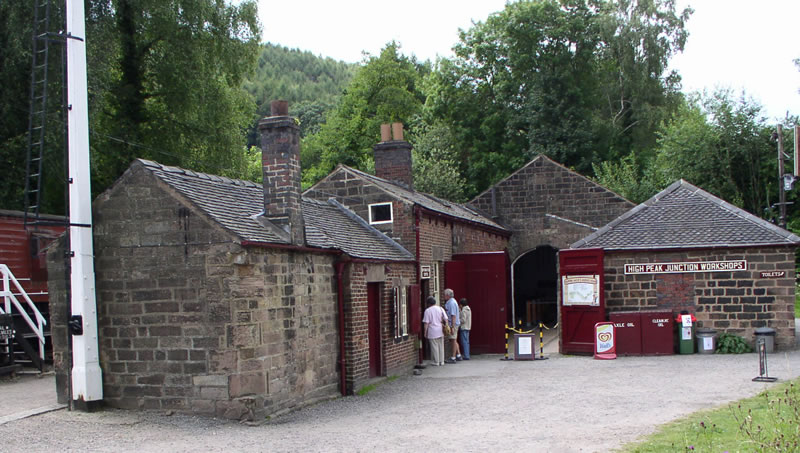
The workshops and offices at High Peak Junction today

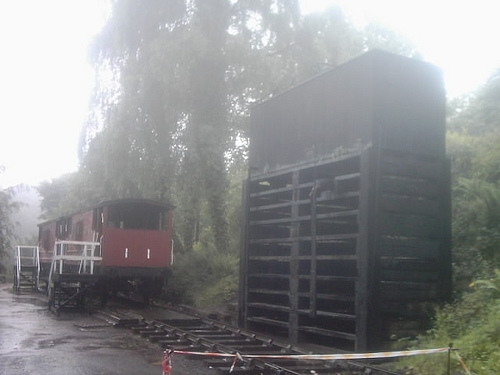
The watertank was used to fill special wagons, for transport up the line.

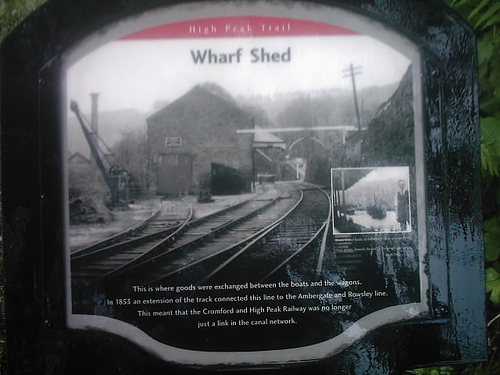
This sign shows the main line branch from the Junction proper running along the wharf, and passing to the right of the Wharf Shed.

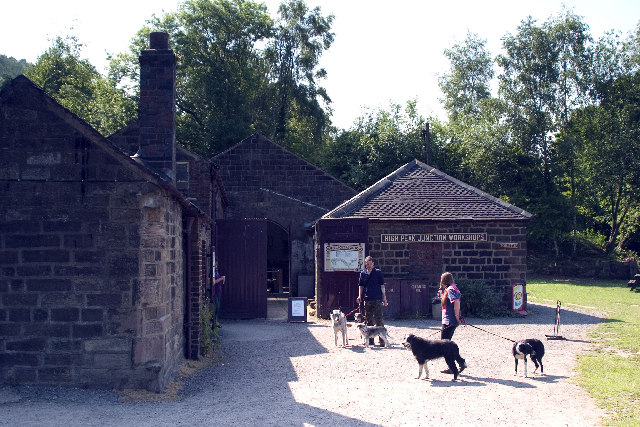
The visitor area today

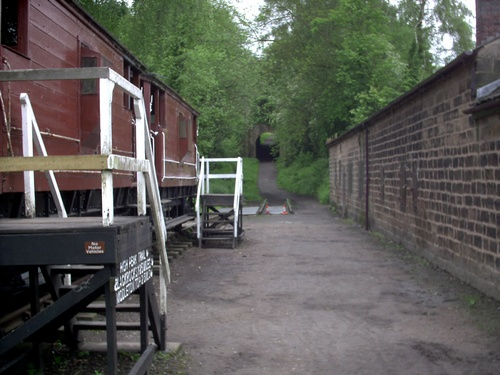
Two brake vans on display at Sheep Pasture bottom. Beyond the bridge in the distance the incline leads up the hill towards Black Rocks and Middleton.

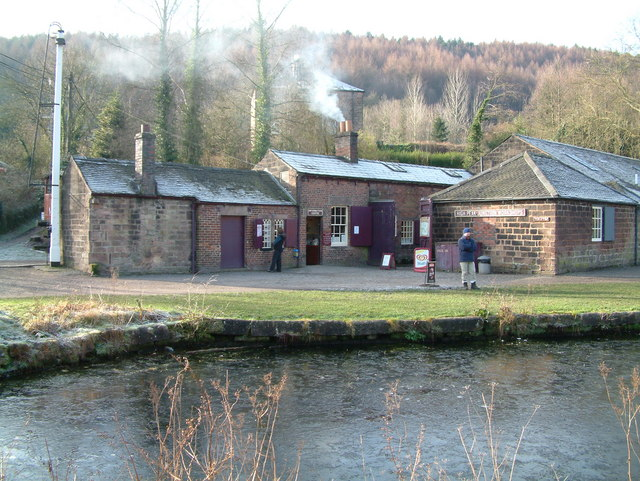
The centre as viewed from across the canal

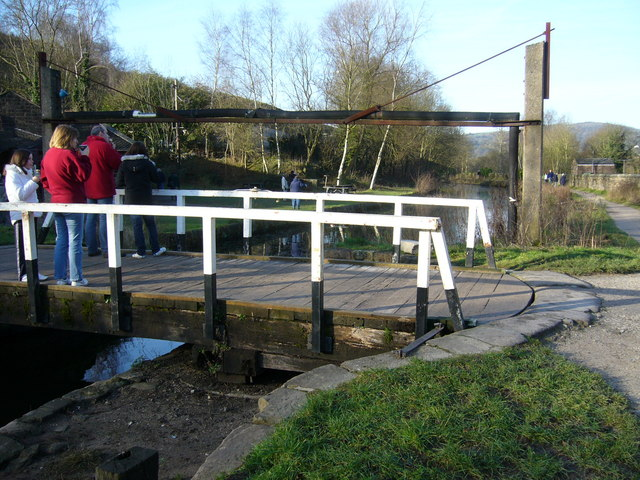
Railway End swingbridge across the Cromford Canal at High Peak Junction

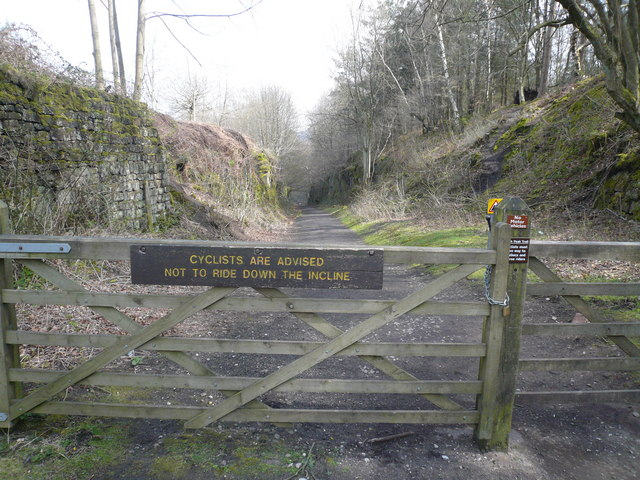
The top of Sheep Pasture incline, which leads up from High Peak Junction

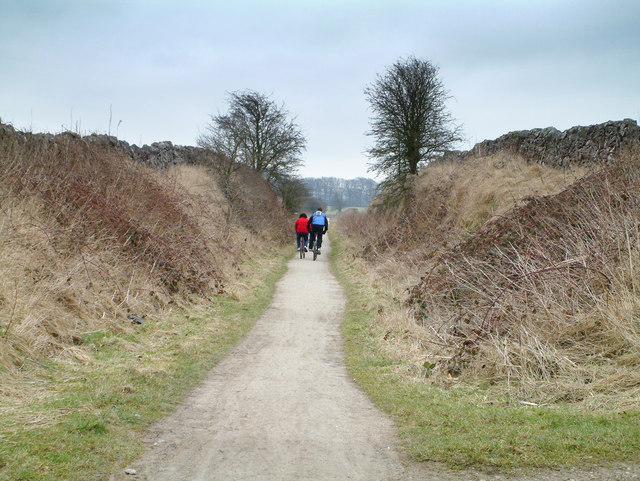
A cutting on the High Peak Trail
