= Alsop en le Dale railway station =

Former railway station in Derbyshire, England

Coordinates: 53.09150°N 1.76878°W

Alsop en le Dale
- Alsop en le Dale station soon after closure

General information
- Location: Buxton, Derbyshire Dales; England
- Grid reference: SK15485498
- Platforms: 2

Other information
- Status: Disused

History
- Original company: London and North Western Railway
- Pre-grouping: London and North Western Railway
- Post-grouping: London, Midland and Scottish Railway

Key dates
- 4 August 1899: Station opened
- 1 November 1954: Station closed to regular traffic
- 7 October 1963: Station closed to all traffic
Location

Alsop en le Dale railway station was opened in 1899 near Alsop en le Dale and Alstonefield, villages in Derbyshire southeast of Buxton.

It was on the Ashbourne Line built by the LNWR as a branch from the Cromford and High Peak Railway (which ran from Whaley Bridge to Cromford) at Parsley Hay. At some time it was known as "Alsop en le Dale for Alstonefield."

== History ==
Opened by the London and North Western Railway, it became part of the London, Midland and Scottish Railway during the Grouping of 1923. The station then passed on to the London Midland Region of British Railways on nationalisation in 1948. It was then closed to regular traffic by the British Transport Commission and finally for excursions by the British Railways Board.

== The line ==
From Hurdlow the line had been fairly easily graded, but at Alsop Moor, roughly halfway from Hartington it began to fall sharply at 1 in 60 (16.7‰) and would continue to do so into Ashbourne. From Alsop to the next station at Tissington the fall was at 1 in 71 (14.1‰).

The descent to Alsop was through Cold Eaton Cutting, 60 feet (18 m) deep and three-quarters of a mile (1.2 km) long, requiring the removal of 300,000 long tons (300,000 t; 340,000 short tons) of limestone.

Two years after the line opened, a train of six-wheeled carriages became derailed by snow and was marooned for three days, during which time the crew were given hot food and drinks by local farmers.

In common with the other stations on this line, the platforms and buildings were of timber construction. From Parsley Hay to Ashbourne the line was single with passing loops at the stations, though provision was made for doubling which never occurred.

Regular passenger services ended in 1954, though excursions continued until 1963. Freight continued until October of that year, the track to Ashbourne finally being lifted in 1964.

Nottingham High School used the station shortly after its closure in the mid 60's as a geography field centre, using the station buildings as accommodation for the students.

== The site today ==
Station site

The station was demolished after closure and later the site became a car park. The track bed from Ashbourne to Parsley Hay was acquired by Derbyshire County Council and the Peak District National Park in 1968 for a cycle and walking route. This, the Tissington Trail, was one of the first of such ventures in the country. Later, Ashbourne Tunnel was acquired by Sustrans.

== Route ==
| Preceding station | Disused railways | Following station |
|---|---|---|
| Hartington; Line and station closed | LNWR; Ashbourne Line | Tissington; Line and station closed |

== See also ==
- Cromford and High Peak Railway
