= Hartington =

Hartington may refer to:

== Places ==
- Hartington, Derbyshire, a village in the Derbyshire Peak District, England
  - Hartington railway station
- Hartington, Nebraska, a city in Cedar County, Nebraska, United States
- Hartington, Northumberland, England, a former civil parish, now in Rothley
- Hartington, Ontario, a small village in Canada

== People ==
- Harry Hartington (1881–1950), English cricketer
- Marquess of Hartington, British Liberal Party leader, 1886–1903

== Other ==
- Hartington City Hall and Auditorium
- Hartington Hall
- Hartington Road Halt railway station, Brighton, England
- Marquess of Hartington, subsidiary title held by the Duke of Devonshire
