= Higher Buxton railway station =

Former railway station in Derbyshire, England

Coordinates: 53.2557°N 1.9083°W

Higher Buxton
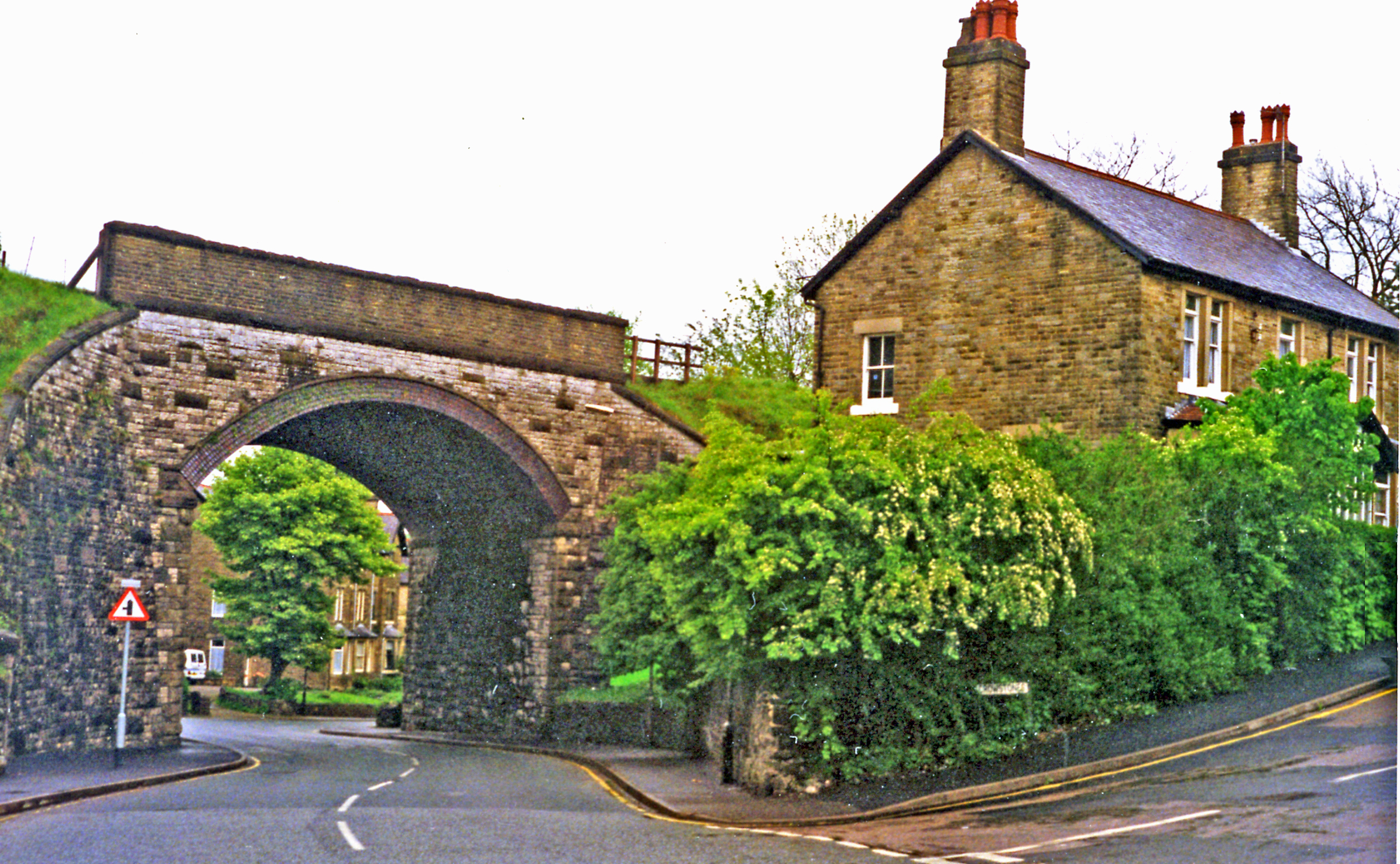
- Station location (1995)

General information
- Location: Buxton, High Peak; England
- Platforms: 2

Other information
- Status: Disused

History
- Original company: London and North Western Railway
- Pre-grouping: London and North Western Railway
- Post-grouping: London, Midland and Scottish Railway

Key dates
- 1 June 1894: Station opened
- 2 April 1951: Station closed
Location

Higher Buxton railway station was opened in 1894 to the south east of Buxton, Derbyshire, on the LNWR line to Ashbourne and the south.

It utilised part of the Cromford and High Peak Railway (which ran from Whaley Bridge to Cromford), joining it at Hindlow and proceeding to a branch to Ashbourne at Parsley Hay

On leaving its bay at Buxton LNWR station, the line turned through a tight 180-degree curve southwards across a thirteen-arch skew viaduct 87 feet (27 m) high over the Midland line and Spring Gardens, with an uphill gradient of 1 in 62 (16.1 ‰). The station was located next to Clifton Road, and between it and Dale Road was an extensive goods yard which had been opened in 1891 as part of the scheme to link Buxton with High Peak Junction near Cromford. Like all the stations on the line the platforms and buildings were of timber construction.

On leaving the station, the line continued its climb across the thirteen arch Duke's Drive Viaduct on its way to Harpur Hill thence to Beswick's Sidings, where the gradient eased to 1 in 330 (3 ‰) as far as Hindlow.

The station was never very busy, being close to the main station, and it closed in 1951.

Passenger services on the line finished in 1954 but the now-single line remains open for mineral trains serving the lime works at Dowlow.

== Route ==
Preceding station	Disused railways	Following station
Buxton (LNWR); Line closed, station open	LNWR; Ashbourne Line	Hindlow; Line and station closed

== See also ==
- Cromford and High Peak Railway
- Ashbourne Line

== Bibliography ==
- Bentley, J.M., Fox, G.K., (1997) Railways of the High Peak: Buxton to Ashbourne (Scenes From The Past series 32), Romiley: Foxline Publishing
