= Dowlow Works =

Quarry in Derbyshire, England

Coordinates: 53.2076°N 1.8480°W

Dowlow Works in 2024

Dowlow Works is a quarry in High Peak, Derbyshire near the village of Earl Sterndale. The quarry has been in operation since 1899, and has extracting permissions until 2046. It produces agricultural lime, crushed rock, white limestone and associated asphalt products.

The works are close to the former Ashbourne Line and Cromford and High Peak Railway, which were closed in the 1950s and 1960s. Passenger and workmen trains once stopped at Dowlow Halt but, in the 21st century, only a stub of the line from Buxton to Hurdlow remains in use. The rest of the line is now the High Peak Trail.
