= Thorpe Cloud railway station =

Former railway station in Derbyshire, England

Thorpe Cloud

General information
- Location: Derbyshire Dales; England
- Coordinates: 53.0497°N 1.7542°W
- Platforms: 1

Other information
- Status: Disused

History
- Original company: London and North Western Railway
- Pre-grouping: London and North Western Railway
- Post-grouping: London, Midland and Scottish Railway; British Railways

Key dates
- 4 August 1899: Station opened
- 1 November 1954: Closed to regular passenger services
- 7 October 1963: Final closure
Location

Thorpe Cloud railway station was opened in 1899 between the villages of Thorpe and Fenny Bentley in Derbyshire, south east of Buxton.

== History ==
The station opened on 4 August 1899 when the London and North Western Railway (LNWR) opened the Parsley Hay to Ashbourne section of the Ashbourne Line, a branch from the Cromford and High Peak Railway (which ran from Whaley Bridge to Cromford) at Parsley Hay.

In common with the other stations on this line, the platforms and buildings were of timber construction. From Parsley Hay to Ashbourne the line was single with passing loops at the stations, though provision was made for doubling which never occurred. Like the previous station at Tissington it was built on a gradient of 1 in 60, downwards towards Ashbourne, and the modular buildings were stepped to accommodate this. The station took its name from a nearby hill, Thorpe Cloud which is at the entrance to Dovedale, and was therefore a popular venue for ramblers. The station was host to a LMS caravan from 1934 to 1939, a camping coach was also positioned here by the London Midland Region from 1954 to 1955.

Regular passenger services ended on 1 November 1954, though excursions continued until 1963. Freight continued until 7 October 1963. The track to Ashbourne finally being lifted in 1964.

The track bed from Ashbourne to Parsley Hay was acquired by Derbyshire County Council and the Peak National Park in 1968 for a cycle and walking route. This, the Tissington Trail, was one of the first of such ventures in the country. Later, Ashbourne Tunnel was acquired by Sustrans.

== Route ==
Preceding station	Disused railways	Following station
Tissington; Line and station closed	LNWR; Ashbourne Line	Ashbourne; Line and station closed

== See also ==
- Cromford and High Peak Railway

== Bibliography ==
- Bentley, J.M.; Fox, G.K. (1997). Railways of the High Peak: Buxton to Ashbourne (Scenes From The Past series 32). Romiley: Foxline.
- Hurst, Geoffrey (1992). Register of Closed Railways: 1948-1991. Worksop, Nottinghamshire: Milepost Publications. ISBN 0-9477-9618-5.
- Jowett, Alan (March 1989). Jowett's Railway Atlas of Great Britain and Ireland: From Pre-Grouping to the Present Day (1st ed.). Sparkford: Patrick Stephens Ltd. ISBN 978-1-85260-086-0. OCLC 22311137.
- McRae, Andrew (1997). British Railway Camping Coach Holidays: The 1930s & British Railways (London Midland Region). Vol. Scenes from the Past: 30 (Part One). Foxline. ISBN 1-870119-48-7.
- Quick, Michael (2022) [2001]. Railway passenger stations in Great Britain: a chronology (PDF). version 5.04. Railway & Canal Historical Society. Archived from the original (PDF) on 25 November 2022.
