= Clifton (Mayfield) railway station =

Former railway station in Derbyshire, England

Clifton (Mayfield)
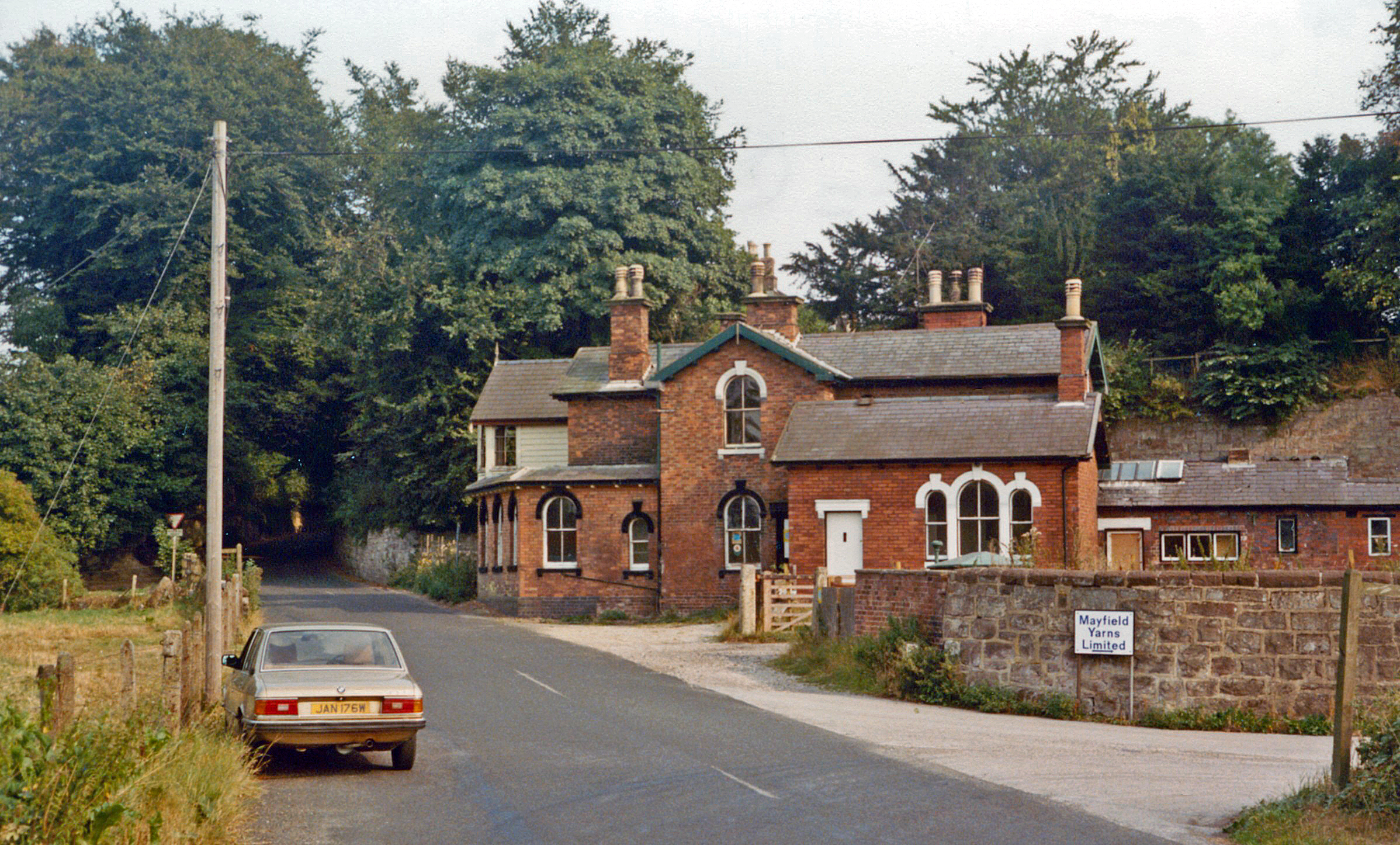
- The station in 1983

General information
- Location: Clifton, Derbyshire Dales; England
- Coordinates: 53.0004°N 1.7564°W
- Grid reference: SK164447
- Platforms: 2

Other information
- Status: Disused

History
- Original company: North Staffordshire Railway
- Post-grouping: London, Midland and Scottish Railway; British Railways

Key dates
- 3 May 1852: Station opened as Clifton
- 22 August 1893: renamed Clifton (Mayfield)
- 1 November 1954: Closed to passengers
- 1964: Final closure
Location

Clifton (Mayfield) railway station was opened on 3 May 1852 by the North Staffordshire Railway at Clifton on the southern fringes of Ashbourne, Derbyshire. Originally named Clifton, it was renamed Clifton (Mayfield) on 22 August 1893, and was known as Clifton for Mayfield in some timetables.

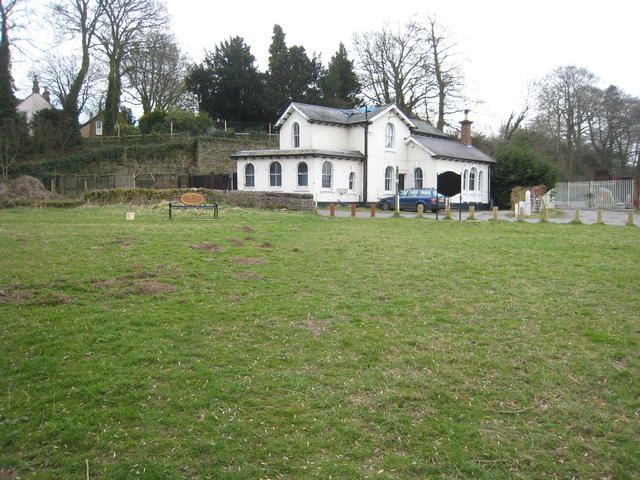
Clifton Station

It was on a branch from Rocester to Ashbourne and in 1899 it was met by the Ashbourne Line built by the London and North Western Railway from Buxton.

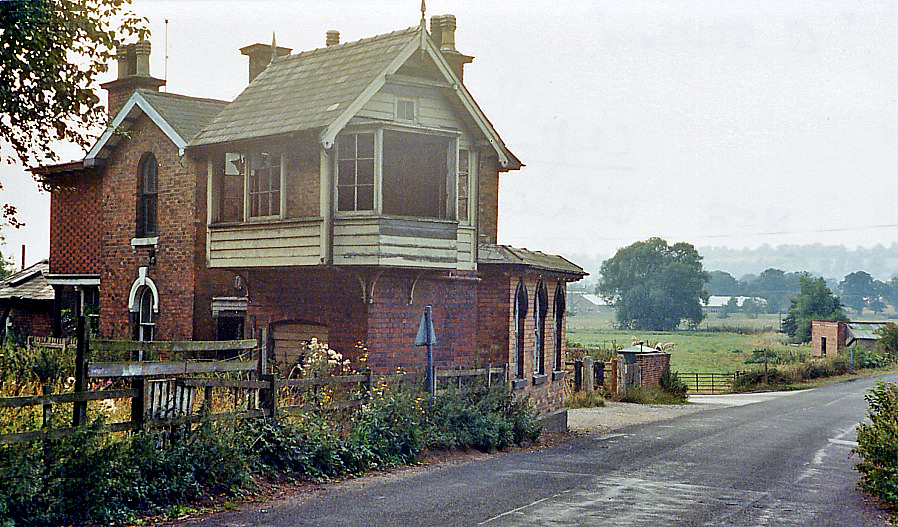
The unique signal box in 1983

Regular passenger services ceased on 1 November 1954 and freight ended in 1964

== Route ==
Preceding station	Disused railways	Following station
Ashbourne	North Staffordshire Railway; Ashbourne Line	Norbury and Ellaston

== See also ==
- Cromford and High Peak Railway
