= Pilsbury (family) =

Family

The Pilsbury family is a British family of Anglo-Norman origins. The family rose to its highest prominence within the counties of Derbyshire and Staffordshire within the United Kingdom and Minnesota, New England and Massachusetts within the United States of America.

The name, which holds many variations in spelling, appears first within the Domesday Book, completed in 1086 by William the Conqueror. Families bearing the name lived in the Derbyshire.

== Early history ==
The surname can be divided into two sections: ‘pile’ or ‘peel’ and ‘burgh’ or ‘borough’. The two respective words have meaning. In Anglo Saxon, 'Burgh' refers to a place of fortification or defence. ‘Pil’ refers to a ‘stake, or pile’. The surname is first recorded as Pilsburie or Pilesberie in 1086 – the spelling of which is testament to the family's Norman origins, within the kingdom of France, before the Norman Conquest.

There are multiple variations in the spelling of the surname. These include: (De) Pilsbury, Pilsburie, Spilsbury, Bateman de Pilsbury, Pilesberie, Pilborough, Pillesborough, Pillsburye and Pyllesbury.

== Origins ==
The Pilsbury family originate from the village of Pilsbury, Derbyshire. The village is situated within the valley of the River Dove, that forms the border between the counties of Staffordshire and Derbyshire. Key features of the village include Pilsbury Castle and Pilsbury Grange. Predominantly, the land surrounding the village is property of the Devonshire Family (Duke of Devonshire, of Chatsworth House) whom the Pilsbury family have historically served. The heir to the Dukedom has historically taken the Title of "Marquess of Hartington". Hartington is the parish in which Pilsbury is situated.

== Family branches ==
Branches of the family are established in other English counties. For example, Essex and Hertfordshire. The Essex family hold ancestral Arms, which can be seen within Burke's Greater Armoury. Within these counties, variation as to the spelling of the surname is often seen as: Pilborough or Pillesborough.

Additionally, surrounding Hartington and Leek (the Staffordshire side of the river Dove), the name is often spelled Pilsbury or Spilsbury. This is quoted as being "a corruption of as early a date as 1600".

== Arms ==
The coats of arms, unique to an individual person or family, are noted within Fairbairn's Book of Crests, 1905 ed., as follows: A Garb Or, Thereon A Dove Ppr. And: A Garb Az.

William Pillsbury of Dorchester in the colony of Massachusetts, New England, died 19 June 1686 at Newbury in said colony. Having established his descent from a subject of the British Crown, Charles Stinson Pilsbury and his forebears were granted honorary arms, crest and badge from the College of Arms.

The granted arms are blazoned: Per fesse Gules and Sable an Eagle displayed Argent within an Orle of Millrings Or. The crest is blazoned: On a Wreath of the Colours Out of a circlet of Bezants conjoined a Pine Tree Proper. The Badge is blazoned: A Mill-bill hafted Sable bladed Or the haft enfilled by a circlet of Bezants conjoined.

== Castle and village ==
Pilsbury castle is a Norman castle and is a key feature of the surrounding landscape. Pilsbury Castle is located strategically on 'high ground', measuring "175 by 150 yards (160 by 137 m)" defensively above the River Dove. Historically, the castle was founded within the Iron-age for military use, before the Norman Conquest of England by the Duke of Normandy. The situation of the castle is of historical importance. Specifically, the location, in terms of proximity to the River Dove, is of notable interest as in medieval times it would have "overlooked a key crossing point". Following the Iron-age use of the fortification, a substantial motte-and-bailey castle was constructed as a defensive fortification.

Historical research suggests that the castle was built in the 11th century, following the Norman Conquest of England, led by William the Conqueror. Substantial acreages in Derbyshire surrounding the village of Pilsbury were held, at the time, by Henry de Ferrers, granted by King William, Duke of Normandy. The De Ferrers family share Norman origins with the Pilsbury family. As a result of the Norman Conquest, many Norman Lords were accompanied by their 'Under-Lords' from the Duchy of Normandy to England.

The De Ferrers' family extended their influence by establishing Castles in Tutbury and Duffield. This served to establish a family 'seat' and a series of defensive fortifications for the De Ferrers family. The Pilsbury family and castle share historic links with the First Creation of the Earldom of Derby through the village: Robert De Ferrers, 1st Earl of Derby was the first of the family to be awarded the title. As a De Ferrers stronghold, Pilsbury castle was largely destroyed after William de Ferrers’ (3rd Earl Derby, First Creation) actions against King Henry II of England in the Revolt of 1173–4. However, other theories surrounding the Castles demise include that after the substantial landholdings passed from the De Ferrers family to the Duchy of Lancaster, as a result of rebellion of Robert De Ferrers, (6th Earl of Derby First Creation) that the castle became unused and was abandoned. The first creation of the Earldom of Derby was created in 1138 and disbanded in 1296.

== Pilsbury Grange ==
Pilsbury Grange, a historic farmstead within the village, has passed through ownership of various county families. Reverend Fylde, previously Vicar within the Parish of Hartington, has stated that "Pilsbury formerly belonged to Merivale Abbey in Warwickshire, a foundation of Cistercian monks." The abbey was founded by Robert De Ferrers in 1148.

However, in the sixteenth century following the dissolution of Merevale Abbey, Pilsbury Grange passed through several other County Families.

Specifically, Pilsbury Grange was purchased by Bess of Hardwick for the Cavendish family (Of Hardwick Hall and Chatsworth House). The rights to ownership of the Grange were first "passed on to her eldest son Henry", however, later the ownership was transferred it to her "second son William Cavendish, ancestor of the Earls (and from 1694 the Dukes) of Devonshire".

== American branch ==
Leading branches have held high offices in American business and politics. Notably, members of the family have been members of the Republican party, serving in the Minnesota State Senate and as mayors of Minneapolis. The families American branch are prominent members within America's Business Elite: running and owning the 'Pillsbury Company', one of the world's largest producers of grain and other products. The company was founded in 1869 by Charles Alfred Pillsbury and John S. Pillsbury. Pillsbury asserted that the Pillsbury "A" Mill was the largest grain mill in the world

William Pillsbury, from whom the American branch of the family descend from, became a resident of Newbury sixteen years after its settlement. "He came, tradition says, from Staffordshire". Within descriptions of William, he is described as "a man of wealth, who owned considerable land and had money to let". The Inventory of the Estates of William Pillsbury were taken by 7 July 1686.

== Genealogy ==
A book has been written exploring the history and lineage by the family by David Brainard and Emily Getchell, published in 1898, entitled: "The Pillsbury family: being a history of William and Dorothy Pillsbury of Newbury in New England, and their descendants to the eleventh generation".

== Pedigree of county families ==
A barrister of the Inner Temple, London, John Sleigh, compiled a history of the "Ancient Parish of Leek" through use of the 'Harleian and Cottonian manuscripts', housed within the British Museum, and the deed-box of the Duke of Westminster. Sleigh has compiled extensive "pedigrees" of the "county families" living in and around Leek parish, with their respective Arms.

Among them were the Davenport family of Capesthorne Hall. Sleigh states that a marriage between "Ralph Davenport, of Tettesworth" had a daughter by the name of "Margaret, who married R. Pilsbury". Additionally, Sleigh states that another "Ralph Davenport, of Tettesworth, will proved 1616, had a daughter who married Edmund Pillsbury."

Another of the "county families" were the Washington's. Sleigh states that their lineage and Arms are identical with those of the "Father of his country", George Washington, first president of the United States of America. The historic marriage register that is stored at St. Edward's church within the Parish of Leek states that:

Benjamin Pilsbury married Anne Washington, 29 September 1634. John Pillsbury married Alice Washington, 15 March 1636.

Other information relating to the family can be found in Sleigh's history. William Bateman de Pilsbury, serving as "gentleman, under-sheriff" to Henry Cavendish of the Cavendish family of Chatsworth House. William born in "1580, obiit 1616, wife Joanna".

Additionally, John Pilsburye was made a "trustee of a chapel by Ralph Bagenall, knight". Sleigh notes that the chapel is still standing in the village of Meerbrook, a few miles from Leek, and was built in 1562 . Furthermore, on 19 July 1605, Lady Awdley granted tithes to Robert Pillsburie.

William de Bateman Pilsbury residing in the neighbouring parish Hartington in the 16th century, originated from the county of Norfolk from a historic Norfolk family. The family built Hartington Hall, "17th-century manor" house located in Hartington.

The Hall is of foremost historical significance as it is believed that during the Jacobite rising in 1745 (where by the Jacobites aimed to restore the House of Stuart to the British throne), that Bonnie Prince Charlie stayed at the Hall Copied content from Hartington Hall; see that page's history for attribution.
