= Tissington railway station =

Former railway station in Derbyshire, England

Tissington
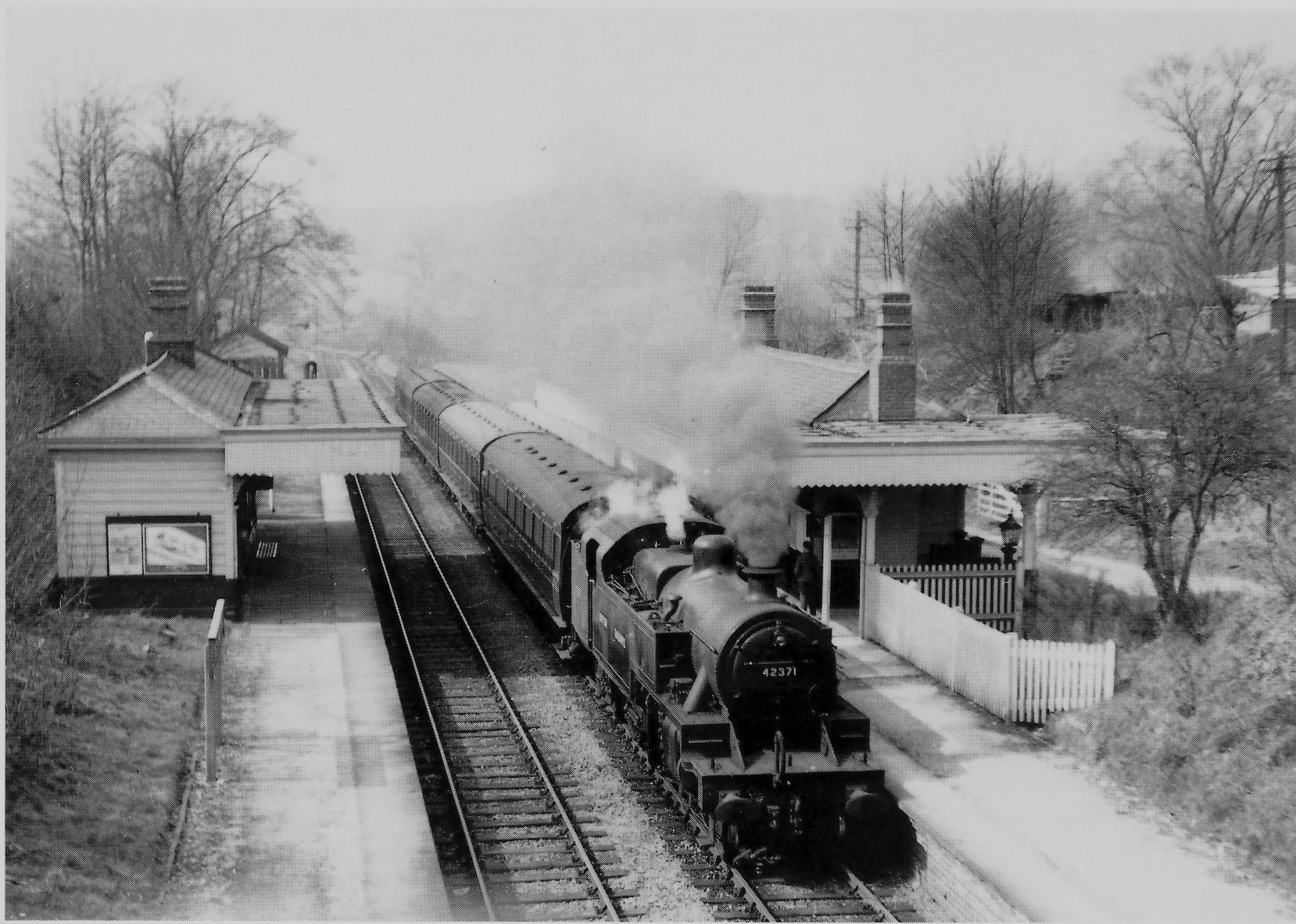

General information
- Location: Derbyshire Dales; England
- Coordinates: 53.0655°N 1.7366°W
- Grid reference: SK177521
- Platforms: 2

Other information
- Status: Disused

History
- Original company: London and North Western Railway
- Post-grouping: London, Midland and Scottish Railway

Key dates
- 4 August 1899: Station opened
- 1 November 1954: Closed to regular passenger services
- 7 October 1963: Final closure
Location

Tissington railway station is a disused British railway station near Tissington (grid reference SK177521), a village in Derbyshire near Ashbourne. It opened on 4 August 1899 and closed on 7 October 1963.

== History ==
Tissington was on the Ashbourne Line, built by the LNWR as a branch from the Cromford and High Peak Railway (which ran from Whaley Bridge to Cromford) at Parsley Hay

In common with the other stations on this line, the buildings were of timber, although the platforms were of conventional construction. From Parsley Hay to Ashbourne the line was single with passing loops at the stations, though provision was made for doubling which never occurred. A hazard for enginemen was that it was built on a gradient of 1 in 60.

Regular passenger services ended in 1954, though excursions continued until 1963, particularly for the annual Well dressing. Freight continued until October of that year, the track to Ashbourne finally being lifted in 1964

The track bed from Ashbourne to Parsley Hay was acquired by Derbyshire County Council and the Peak National Park in 1968 for a cycle and walking route. This, the Tissington Trail, was one of the first of such ventures in the country. Later, Ashbourne Tunnel was acquired by Sustrans.

== Route ==
Preceding station	Disused railways	Following station
Alsop en le Dale; Line and station closed	LNWR; Ashbourne Line	Thorpe Cloud; Line and station closed

== See also ==
- Cromford and High Peak Railway
