= Hindlow railway station =

Former railway station in Derbyshire, England

Hindlow
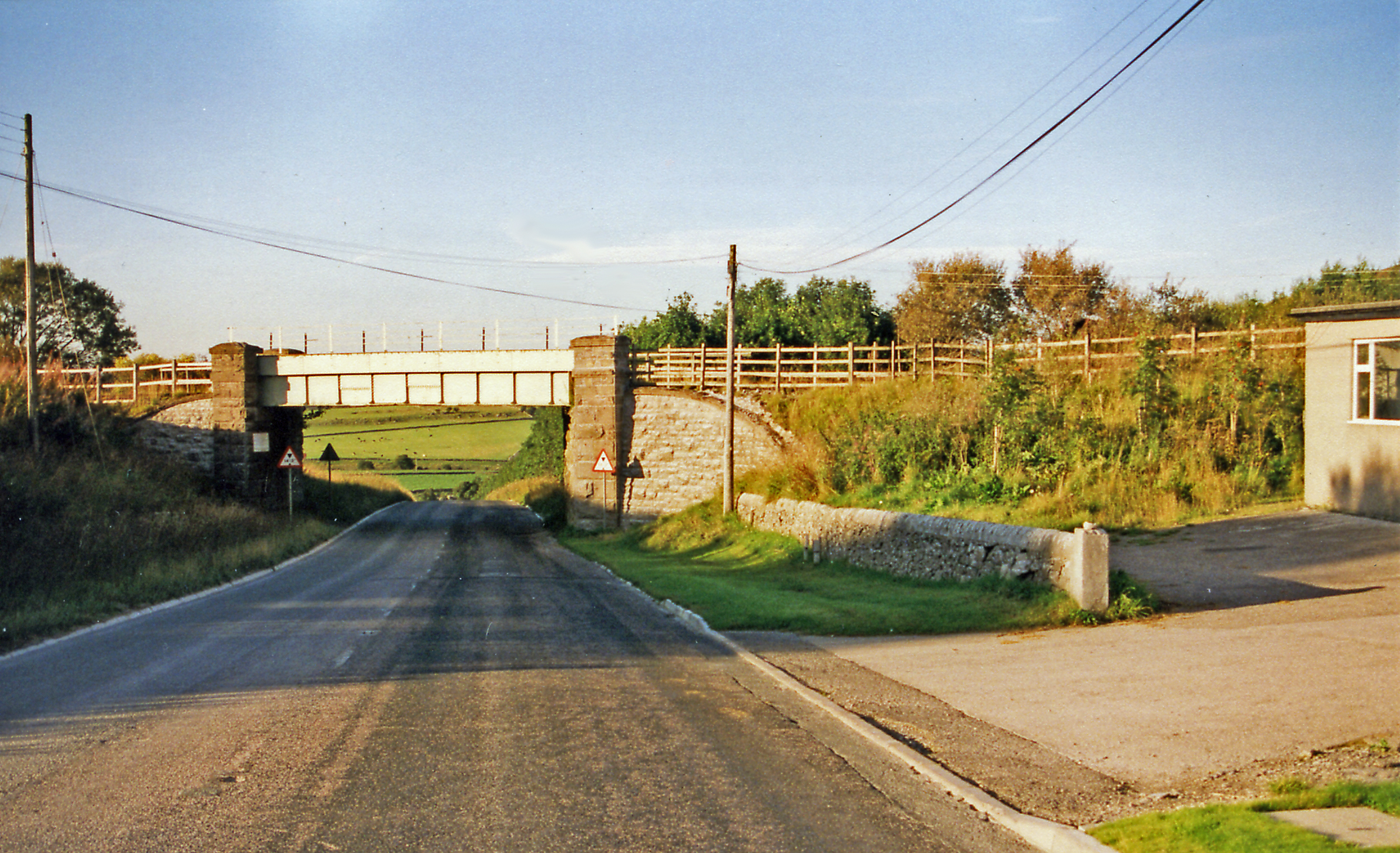
- Location of Hindlow station (1999)

General information
- Location: High Peak; England
- Coordinates: 53.2203°N 1.8729°W
- Grid reference: SK086692

Other information
- Status: Disused

History
- Original company: Cromford and High Peak Railway
- Pre-grouping: London and North Western Railway
- Post-grouping: London, Midland and Scottish Railway

Key dates
- June 1833: Station opened for goods
- July 1856: Opened for passengers
- December 1877: closed
- 1 June 1894: reopened LNWR
- 1 November 1954: closed to scheduled services
- 7 October 1963: Final closure
Location

Hindlow railway station was opened for goods in 1833 near to Hindlow near King Sterndale to the south east of Buxton, Derbyshire on the Cromford and High Peak Railway (which ran from Whaley Bridge to Cromford) and the LNWR line to Ashbourne and the south.

== History ==
The Cromford and High Peak Railway goods station opened in 1833. It was opened for passengers in 1856 but closed in 1877.

A new station was opened in 1894 by the LNWR when it built its branch to Ashbourne from a junction at Parsley Hay

At this time the C&HPR line to Whaley Bridge was closed. Just before the station there was a junction to a stub of the old line which continued to serve the Hillhead branch. The junction was known as the Buxton and High Peak Junction, not to be confused with High Peak Junction at the other end of the C&HPR near Cromford.

Like all the stations on the line the platforms and buildings were of timber construction. Regular passenger services on the line finished on Saturday 30 October 1954. Occasional special passenger trains used the station until 7 October 1963 when the station was closed completely. The station was removed in 1966.

At Hindlow was a sidings for Ryan, Somerville and Company, and another for W.Spencer and Company (later Buxton Lime Firms Ltd.) These were two of the many lime works served by this stretch of line, which covered everything with a patina of white powder which on many photographs from this era is mistaken for snow. This section still exists, serving the lime works at Dowlow.

After a fairly easy stretch of 1 in 330 (3‰) from Beswick's Sidings, the line began to climb again at 1 in 60 (16.7‰) through Hindlow Tunnel to the summit at Brigg's Sidings and Dowlow Halt.

== Image gallery ==
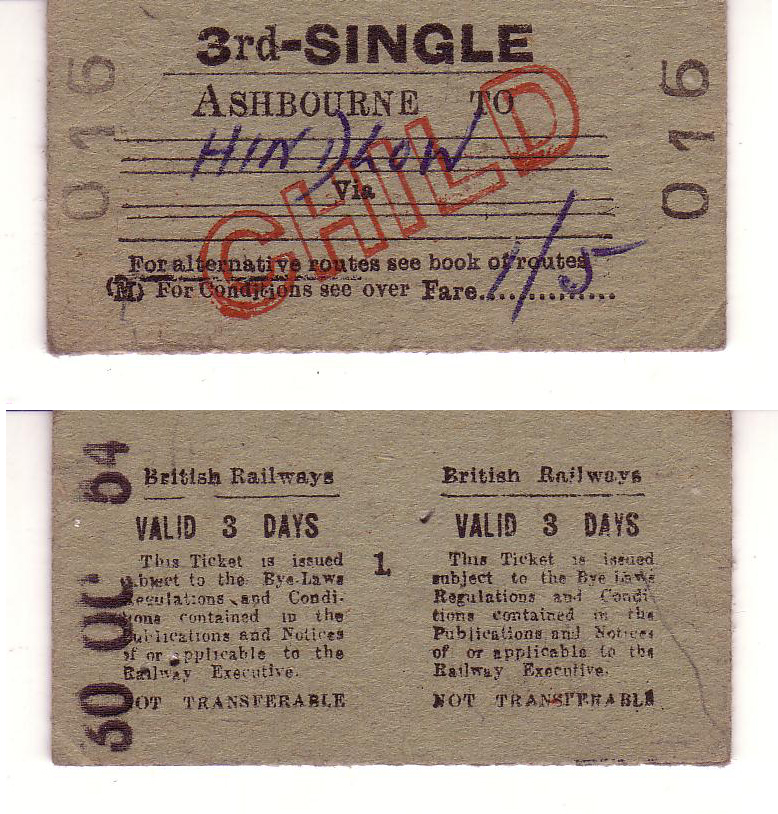

== Route ==
Preceding station	Disused railways	Following station
Higher Buxton; Line and station closed	London and North Western Railway; Cromford and High Peak Railway	Dowlow Halt; Line and station closed

== See also ==
- Cromford and High Peak Railway
- London and North Western Railway
- London, Midland and Scottish Railway

== Bibliography ==
- Bentley, J.M., Fox, G.K., (1997) Railways of the High Peak: Buxton to Ashbourne (Scenes From The Past series 32), Romiley: Foxline Publishing
