= Norbury and Ellaston railway station =

Former railway station in Derbyshire, England

Coordinates: 52.9779°N 1.8187°W

Norbury and Ellaston

General information
- Location: Derbyshire Dales; England
- Grid reference: SK122422
- Platforms: 2

Other information
- Status: Disused

History
- Original company: North Staffordshire Railway
- Pre-grouping: North Staffordshire Railway
- Post-grouping: London, Midland and Scottish Railway; British Railways

Key dates
- 31 May 1852: Station opened as Norbury
- November 1901: renamed Norbury and Ellastone
- 2 April 1923: renamed Norbury and Ellaston
- 1 November 1954: regular services passenger services end
- c. April 1958: Station closed
Location

Norbury and Ellaston railway station was on a branch of the North Staffordshire Railway between Rocester and Ashbourne. The station, which had a waiting room, ticket office, and stationmaster's office, and two side platforms, opened at Norbury, Derbyshire in 1852.

In 1899 the line was joined with the Ashbourne Line built by the London and North Western Railway from Buxton.

Regular passenger services ended in 1954, freight finished in 1956. Occasional excursion trains and specials continued to use the station until it was officially closed in 1958. The line closed in 1963 and the track lifted.

== Route ==
| Preceding station | Disused railways | Following station |
|---|---|---|
| Clifton Mayfield | North Staffordshire Railway; Ashbourne Line | Rocester |

== See also ==
- Cromford and High Peak Railway
