= River City Church =

Church in Minneapolis, Minnesota, U.S.

Coordinates: 44°58′30″N 93°16′40″W

River City Church (formerly First Baptist Church) is a Baptist church in Minneapolis, Minnesota, member of the Venture Church Network.

== History ==
It was founded in 1853 at Saint Anthony Falls by E. W. Cressey, a missionary with the American Baptist Home Mission Society, together with members of First Baptist Church of Saint Paul and St. Anthony gathered on March 5, 1853, and committed themselves to organizing a "Regular Baptist Church," the first Church organized in Minnesota Territory west of the Mississippi River.

The first permanent home for the Church was at Third and Nicollet, and was the largest meeting hall in Minneapolis. With the rapid growth of the city a larger building was built at 5th and Hennepin in 1857. In 1871 a group of Swedish attendees at First Baptist Church formed Bethlehem Baptist Church. A new building was inaugurated in 1885 at 10th Street and Hennepin Avenue. The building was designed by the firm of Kees and Fisk, which later became the firm of Long and Kees. It is built of Kasota limestone in a blend of the Romanesque and Gothic Revival styles. The original steeples were blown down in a 1967 windstorm.

In the late 19th century, the church was one of "silk stockings and blue bloods", with the prominent Minneapolis Pillsbury, Dunwoody, and Jewett families in attendance.

William Bell Riley, an American Baptist evangelical Christian, served as pastor of the church for forty-five years (1897–1942) and another five as pastor emeritus until his death in 1947. He also founded the Northwestern Bible Training School along with an evangelical seminary, now known as University of Northwestern – St. Paul. During his time as pastor, Riley sought to open the church to servants, factory workers, and other non-aristocrats. He further alienated wealthy members when he openly opposed the Spanish—American War of 1898, and many left to found the Trinity Baptist Church, also in Minneapolis

In 2020, the church announced that they would be changing their name to River City Church.

In 2022, the church sold the building to Eagle Brook Church and moved to 11th Avenue.

== Demographics ==
In 1897, First Baptist had 600 members, growing to about 3,000 in the 1930s.

== LGBTQ issues ==
River City Church's Statement of Faith denounces homosexuality and gender transition as sinful. Both leaders and official church members are required to affirm the Statement of Faith.
