= Dowlow Halt railway station =

Former railway station in Derbyshire, England

Dowlow Halt
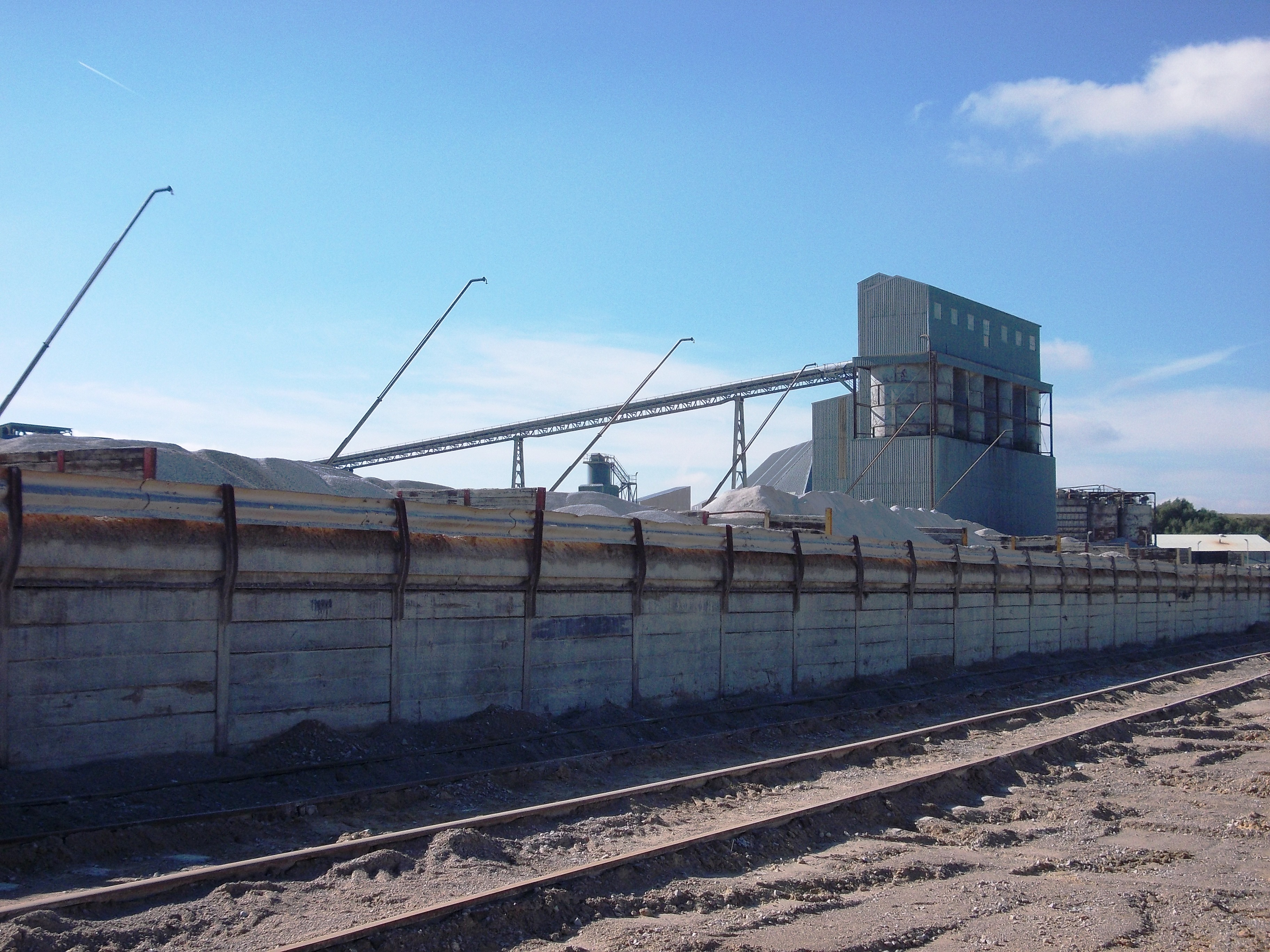
- The station site, on the line running past Dowlow Limestone Works

General information
- Location: Dowlow, High Peak; England
- Coordinates: 53.2076°N 1.8480°W
- Grid reference: SK102678
- Platforms: 2

Other information
- Status: Disused

History
- Original company: London and North Western Railway
- Pre-grouping: London and North Western Railway
- Post-grouping: London, Midland and Scottish Railway

Key dates
- 1920: Opened for workmen
- 4 Nov 1929: Opened to public
- 1 Nov 1954: Closed
Location

Dowlow Halt was opened in 1920 between Dowlow (hill now largely quarried away) and Greatlow to the south east of Buxton, Derbyshire on the London and North Western Railway line to Ashbourne and the south.

== History ==
The line utilised part of the Cromford and High Peak Railway (which ran from Whaley Bridge to Cromford) joining it near Hindlow and proceeding to a branch to Ashbourne at Parsley Hay.

After leaving Hindlow the line began to climb at 1 in 60 (16.7 ‰) through Hindlow Tunnel to Brigg's Sidings and its summit at Dowlow Halt. 1,260 feet (380 m) at the summit, this was the highest main line in England at the time. From Dowlow Halt the line travelled downhill at a gradient of 1 in 60 (16.7 ‰) to Hurdlow.

Brigg's Sidings served Messrs. Briggs and the Dowlow Lime and Stone Company (later Steetley, then Redland Aggregates).

The halt itself was unstaffed with two short stone platforms and without buildings, since it was initially used by workmen's trains for the nearby works. It was opened for public services in November 1929. Passenger services on the line finished in 1954.

One section still exists, serving Buxton Lime Industries, and terminating a short distance further on at the Lafarge Dowlow sidings.

== Route ==
Preceding station	Disused railways	Following station
Hindlow; Line and station closed	Cromford and High Peak Railway	Hurdlow; Line and station closed
Hindlow; Line and station closed	LNWR; Ashbourne Line	Hurdlow; Line and station closed

== See also ==
- Cromford and High Peak Railway

== Bibliography ==
- Bentley, J.M., Fox, G.K., (1997) Railways of the High Peak: Buxton to Ashbourne (Scenes From The Past series 32), Romiley: Foxline Publishing
