= Tissington Trail =

Rail trail in Derbyshire, England

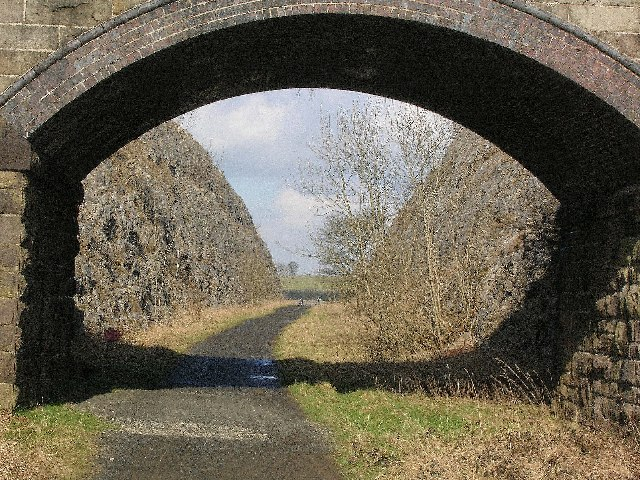
- Coldeaton Cutting
- Length: 13 mi (21 km)
- Location: Derbyshire, England
- Designation: Rail trail
- Trailheads: Parsley Hay (Note: Location: 53.1706°N 1.7828°W) and Ashbourne (Note: Location: 53.0196°N 1.7397°W)
- Use: Walking; hiking; running; cycling; horseriding

The Tissington Trail is a rail trail in Derbyshire, England, which follows the trackbed of the former railway line connecting Ashbourne to Buxton. It takes its name from the village of Tissington, around which the trail skirts. Opened in 1971, and now a part of the National Cycle Network, it stretches for 13 mi (21 km) from Parsley Hay in the north to Ashbourne in the south.

== History ==
Built by the LNWR, the line opened in 1899, and linked with the Cromford and High Peak Railway at Parsley Hay, a line completed nearly 70 years earlier to link the Cromford Canal wharf at High Peak Junction with the Peak Forest Canal at Whaley Bridge. It was the last of the railways to be built in the Peak District. Whilst the section from Parsley Hay to Ashbourne was single tracked, (Note: From Parsley Hay north to Buxton, it was double tracked.) the formation was constructed to allow for doubling if necessary; however, this never happened. There were passing loops at the former stations: Hartington, Alsop en le Dale, Tissington and Thorpe Cloud.

Despite the relatively short length of this branch line, it was deservedly popular with walkers and ramblers, enjoying its heyday in the 1930s. Apart from the elevated views over the Peak itself, a large attraction was that this line passed close to Dovedale. For a time, the line also carried a through-service for passengers from London Euston to Manchester London Road, via Nuneaton, Uttoxeter, Ashbourne and Buxton; a daily train also transported local milk to London. However, the line suffered from passing through a sparsely populated area and it was closed to regular passenger traffic in 1954; all services between Ashbourne and Hartington ceased in October 1963, including excursion traffic and specials, such as run during bad weather or well dressing specials. The route between Hartington and Parsley Hay survived until October 1967.

== Route ==
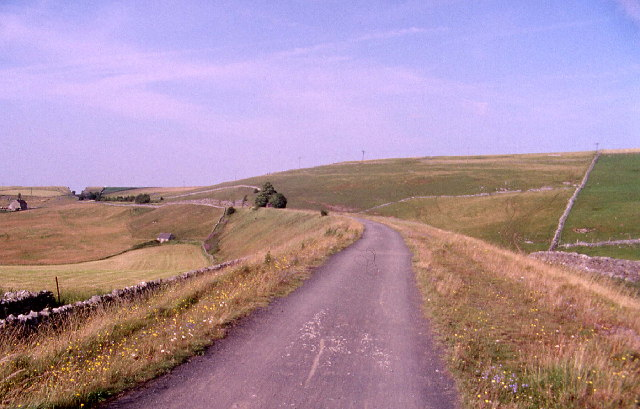
The trail, just south of Parsley Hay

At Parsley Hay, a small settlement to the north-east of Hartington, it is joined by the High Peak Trail, another rail trail which is 17 miles (27 km) in length from High Peak Junction, near Cromford in Matlock, to Dowlow, near Buxton.

The trail has a firm crushed-limestone surface, which is suitable for hikers, cyclists, horse-riding and wheelchair users; it has easy level access at many points along its route. The elevated nature of the line (Note: At Parsley Hay, it is over 1,000 feet (305 m) above sea level.) means that it affords good views, but it is exposed in poor weather. The trail runs gently downhill from Parsley Hay southwards but, about 1/4 mile (400 m) north of the bicycle hire centre at Mapleton Lane in Ashbourne, the trail dips down and up where a viaduct has been removed; both slopes are about 130 feet (40 m) long with gradients of 1:9.

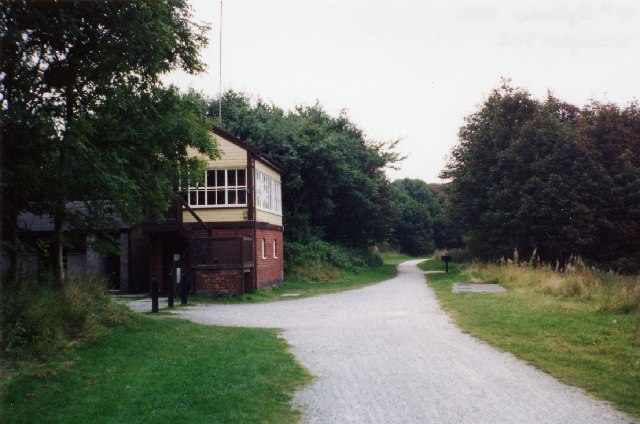
The restored Hartington signal box beside the trail; it is now an information centre

Hartington signal box, beside the trail although some distance from the village, has been converted to an information centre, which is open in summer on Saturdays, Sundays and bank holidays. The National Park Authority operates bicycle hire at both ends of the trail.

From Hartington station northwards, the route forms part of the Pennine Bridleway, a 130-mile (209 km) shared-use path which includes 73 miles (117 km) through Derbyshire to the South Pennines. The trail has two southern starting points, with another at Middleton Top, near Cromford, on the High Peak Trail.

== Facilities ==
The following facilities are available at the trail's main locations:

- Parsley Hay station: (Note: Location: SK146637.) there is a car park, toilets, picnic site, visitor information, café and bicycle hire; there is direct level access to the trail.
- Hartington station: (Note: Location: SK149610.) there is a car park with toilets and picnic site; there is level access onto the trail.
- Ruby Wood: (Note: Location: SK149604.) there is a car park and a picnic site.
- Alsop-en-le-Dale: (Note: Location: SK155549.) there is a car park with picnic site, with level access onto the trail.
- Tissington: (Note: Location: SK177520.) there is a car park, café, toilets and picnic site, with a tea room in the village itself.
- Thorpe Cloud: (Note: Location: SK165503.) there is a small car park and picnic site, with level access onto the trail.
- Narlows Lane, near Thorpe: (Note: Location: SK163504.) there is a car park.
- Mapleton Lane, near Ashbourne: (Note: Location: SK175473.) there is a car park, café, toilets and bicycle hire.

== See also ==
- Monsal Trail
- List of rail trails.
