= Hurdlow railway station =

Former railway station in Derbyshire, England

Hurdlow
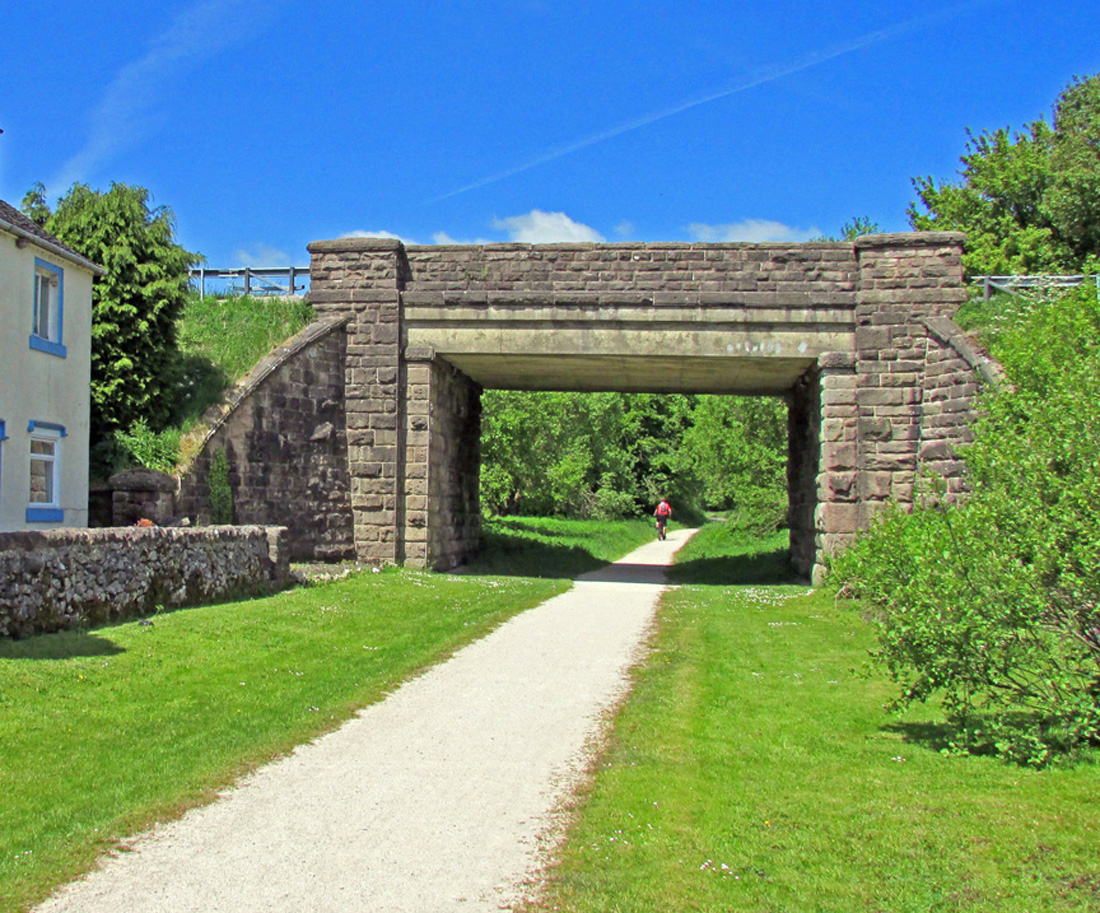
- The site of the station, 2015

General information
- Location: Hurdlow, Hartington Middle Quarter, Derbyshire Dales; England
- Coordinates: 53.1914°N 1.8106°W
- Grid reference: SK127660
- Platforms: 2

Other information
- Status: Disused

History
- Original company: Cromford and High Peak Railway
- Pre-grouping: London and North Western Railway
- Post-grouping: London, Midland and Scottish Railway

Key dates
- June 1833: Station opened for goods
- July 1856: Opened for passengers
- December 1877: Closed
- 1 June 1894: Reopened by the LNWR
- 15 August 1949: Closed
- 1 November 1954: Final closure
Location

Hurdlow railway station served the hamlet of Hurdlow, within the Hartington Middle Quarter civil parish, near Buxton, in Derbyshire, England. It was a stop on the London and North Western Railway's line to Ashbourne and the south.

== History ==
Hurdlow station after closure

The station opened for goods in 1833 on the Cromford and High Peak Railway, between Whaley Bridge to Cromford. Passenger services began in 1856, but it closed in 1877. When it became part of the Ashbourne Line, the LNWR reopened it in 1894.

In some timetables, it was listed as Hurdlow for Longnor and Monyash; the platforms and buildings were of timber construction, as in all the stations on the line.

From the summit at 1,260 feet (380 m) above sea level at Dowlow Halt, the line descended at 1 in 60 (16.7‰) to Hurdlow. From here to Ashbourne, the gradients would become much easier, though this was countered by the curves as the line endeavoured to follow the contours.

Easter Tuesdays were particularly busy with special trains laid on for the Flagg Moor Steeplechase.

The station was closed to passengers on 15 August 1949. but continued in occasional use for workmen until the line closed in 1954.

Preceding station	Disused railways	Following station
Dowlow Halt; Line and station closed	Cromford and High Peak Railway	Parsley Hay; Line and station closed
Dowlow Halt; Line and station closed	LNWR; Ashbourne Line	Parsley Hay; Line and station closed

== The site today ==
Although the station buildings and platforms have been demolished, the site lies at a point where the High Peak Trail, which occupies the track bed, passes under a bridge carrying the road from Longnor to Monyash.
