= Listed buildings in Hartington Town Quarter =

Hartington Town Quarter is a civil parish in the Derbyshire Dales district of Derbyshire, England. The parish contains 39 listed buildings that are recorded in the National Heritage List for England. Of these, one is listed at Grade II*, the middle of the three grades, and the others are at Grade II, the lowest grade. The parish contains the village of Hartington and the surrounding countryside. Most of the listed buildings are houses, cottages, farmhouses, and associated structures. The other listed buildings include a church, hotels and public houses, a bridge, two mileposts, and a war memorial.

== Key ==
Grade	Criteria
II*	Particularly important buildings of more than special interest
II	Buildings of national importance and special interest

== Buildings ==
Name and location	Photograph	Date	Notes	Grade
St Giles' Church; 53.14134°N 1.80761°W		13th century	The church has been altered and extended through the centuries, and was restored in 1858 by Henry Currey. It is built in sandstone, limestone and gritstone and has lead roofs. The church has a cruciform plan, consisting of a nave with a clerestory, a south porch, north and south transepts with aisles, a chancel, and a west tower. The tower has three stages, buttresses, a west window with a moulded surround and a pointed arch and hood mould, slit windows, and clock faces. In the top stage are bell openings, over which is a moulded string course with gargoyles, and embattled parapets with crocketed corner pinnacles. Also, along the body of the church are embattled parapets.	II*
Hartington Hall; 53.14015°N 1.80451°W		1611	A large house that has been extended and much altered and used for other purposes, it is in limestone with gritstone dressings, quoins, and a stone slate roof with coped gables, moulded kneelers, and ball finials. There are two storeys and attics, and an H-shaped plan with rear additions. On the front are three gables, a doorway with a moulded surround, a four-centred arched head, a dated and initialled lintel and a bracketed hood. The windows are mullioned with hood moulds.	II
Wolfscote Grange; 53.12079°N 1.80038°W		1649	A farmhouse in limestone with gritstone dressings, and a tile roof with coped gables and plain kneelers. There are two storeys and four bays. The second bay has a projecting sandstone gabled porch with ridgeback copings and moulded kneelers. It contains a doorway with a chamfered surround, a four-centred arched head, and a lintel with three inscribed and dated panels. Above is a moulded string course, and a single-light window with a semicircular head and a moulded architrave. Elsewhere, most of the windows are mullioned, there is a horizontally-sliding sash window in the right bay, and at the rear is a projecting staircase bay with a single-light window.	II
Moat Hall Farmhouse; 53.14525°N 1.81272°W		17th century	The farmhouse, which was altered in the 19th century, is in gritstone, and has a stone slate roof with coped gables and moulded kneelers. There are two storeys and three bays. The doorway has a large lintel, the earlier windows are mullioned, and the later ones are sashes.	II
Thatchers; 53.14279°N 1.81103°W		17th century	A pair of cottages, later combined, in limestone with gritstone dressings, and stone slate roofs with coped gables and plain kneelers. There are two storeys and three bays. On the front are two doorways with quoined surrounds and flat hoods on brackets, and the windows are mullioned with two lights. At the rear is a mullioned and transomed window. The attached front garden wall contains gritstone gate piers and an elaborate cast iron gate.	II
Outbuildings north of Bank Top Farmhouse; 53.15100°N 1.80846°W		1687	A farmhouse and barns, later used as outbuildings, in limestone with gritstone dressings, massive quoins, and stone slate roofs with coped gables and plain kneelers. There are two storeys and the building contains doorways, windows and a hayloft door, all with four-centred arched heads, a mullioned window, and a dated and initialled plaque.	II
Digmer Farmhouse; 53.14295°N 1.81112°W		18th century	The farmhouse, later a private house, is in rendered stone with painted stone dressings and a tile roof. There are two storeys, three bays, and a lean-to on the right. The doorway has a flush surround, and the windows are mullioned and contain two casements.	II
Pilsbury Farmhouse; 53.16806°N 1.82561°W		Mid 18th century	The farmhouse is in limestone with gritstone dressings, quoins, a string course, a moulded eaves cornice, and a slate roof. There are three storeys and three bays. The central doorway has a bracketed moulded pediment. The windows on the front are sashes, and at the rear is a transomed stair window and two-light mullioned windows.	II
The Old School House; 53.14139°N 1.80884°W		1758	The former school house is in limestone with gritstone dressings, quoins, and a tile roof. There are two storeys and two bays. The central doorway has a quoined surround, an inscribed lintel, and a bracketed hood. The windows are mullioned with two lights, and between the upper floor windows is a dated and initialled plaque with a moulded top and base.	II
Watergap Farmhouse; 53.14398°N 1.81175°W		1766	The farmhouse, later a private house, is in limestone with gritstone dressings, quoins, and a tile roof with coped gables and moulded kneelers. The central doorway has a moulded hood mould, and the windows are casements. Between the top floor windows is a stepped circular dated plaque.	II
Charles Cotton Hotel; 53.14050°N 1.81057°W		Late 18th century	The hotel is in limestone and gritstone, with gritstone dressings, quoins, an eaves band, and a tile roof. It consists of a range with three storeys and four bays, and a cross-wing to the left with two storeys, three bays, and a coped gable with plain kneelers, the gable containing a coat of arms. The windows in the main range are sashes, and in the cross-wing they are mullioned and transomed.	II
Cottage and barn east of Dale Cottages; 53.14144°N 1.80572°W	—	Late 18th century	The cottage and attached barn, the latter converted for residential use, are in limestone with gritstone dressings, quoins, and a tile roof, two storeys, and a lean-to on the right. The cottage has a doorway with a quoined surround and a two-light mullioned window in each floor, and the former barn has a stable roof and inserted windows.	II
Mill Lane Farmhouse; 53.14010°N 1.81071°W	—	Late 18th century	The farmhouse is in limestone with gritstone dressings, quoins, a coved eaves band, and a tile roof with moulded gable copings and plain kneelers. There are two storeys and three bays. The central doorway has a massively quoined surround, a traceried fanlight and a bracketed hood. The windows are mullioned with two or three lights.	II
Pilsbury Grange; 53.16788°N 1.82515°W		Late 18th century	A farmhouse in limestone with gritstone dressings, quoins, and a slate roof with coped gables and plain kneelers. There are three storeys and four bays. The doorway has a bracketed hood, and the windows either have a single light, or are mullioned with three casements.	II
Meri Cottage, 2, 3 and 4 Market Place; 53.14087°N 1.80877°W		1777	A row of four cottages in pebbledashed stone with painted stone dressings, gritstone quoins, a slate roof, and a coped gable and kneelers to the right. There are two storeys, and each cottage has a single bay. The right doorway has moulded imposts and a hood, and the other doorways have plain surrounds. The windows of the middle two cottages are mullioned with two lights, the other cottages have inserted windows, and in the centre of the upper floor is an initialled datestone.	II
The Old Vicarage and wall 53.14129°N 1.80969°W		1780	The vicarage, later a private house, in limestone with gritstone dressings, quoins, and a tile roof. There are three storeys, three bays, and a rear wing. The central doorway has a bracketed moulded hood, above which is a window with a moulded hood, and a stone plaque with an oval disc, floral decoration, and the date. The other windows are replacement casements. The garden is enclosed by a wall with an attached four-step mounting block.	II
Springfield House; 53.14172°N 1.81023°W		1790	A limestone house with gritstone dressings, quoins, a moulded eaves cornice, and a slate roof with coped gables and plain kneelers. There are three storeys and three bays, and a single-storey addition to the east. The central doorway has a semicircular-arched head, stepped jambs, projecting impost blocks, and a flat hood on tall brackets. The windows on the front are sashes, and between the windows in the top floor is a dated circular plaque. At the rear is a central transomed stair window.	II
Dale Cottage; 53.14121°N 1.80653°W	—	Early 19th century	The cottage is in limestone with gritstone dressings, quoins, and a tile roof. There are two storeys and two bays. The central doorway has a bracketed hood, and the windows are mullioned with two casements.	II
Dale House; 53.14097°N 1.80778°W		Early 19th century	The house is in limestone with gritstone dressings, quoins, and a tile roof. There are two storeys and three bays. In the centre is a semicircular-headed doorway with a moulded architrave, stepped imposts, a traceried fanlight, and a projecting keystone. The windows are sashes with flush surrounds.	II
Dove Cottage and railings 53.14069°N 1.81031°W	—	Early 19th century	A gritstone house with quoins, a moulded eaves cornice, and a stone slate roof with coped gables and moulded kneelers. There are two storeys and three bays. The central doorway has a reeded surround, projecting square corners with a flower motif, a rectangular fanlight, and a small bracketed hood. The windows are sashes with incised fluted keystones. Attached to the front is a low wall, and railings with arrowhead and urn finials.	II
Hartington Bridge; 53.13560°N 1.82098°W		Early 19th century	The bridge carries the B5052 road over the River Dove. It is in gritstone, and consists of a single shallow segmental arch. The bridge has voussoirs, a moulded string course, and a plain parapet with square-sectioned copings. The walls curve outwards at the ends and finish at octagonal piers with pyramidal copings.	II
Ivy Cottage and Rose Cottage; 53.14079°N 1.81029°W	—	Early 19th century	A pair of cottages in limestone, partly rendered, with gritstone dressings, quoins, and a coped gable and a plain kneeler to the south. There are two storeys and each cottage has one bay. The doorways in the centre have flush surrounds, the windows in the left cottage are mullioned with two lights, and in the right cottage they are 20th-century replacements.	II
Ivydene; 53.14080°N 1.80856°W		Early 19th century	A house in rendered stone with gritstone dressings, quoins, and a tile roof with coped gables and plain kneelers. There are two storeys and three bays. In the centre is a doorway with a semicircular head, Doric pilasters, a fanlight, and a broken pediment. The windows are sashes with flush surrounds.	II
Ludwell Mill Farmhouse; 53.15793°N 1.81566°W		Early 19th century	The farmhouse is in rendered stone with painted stone dressings, quoins, and a stone slate roof. There are two storeys, an L-shaped plan, and a front of two bays. The central doorway has a reeded surround, corner blocks and a keystone with flower motifs, and a rectangular fanlight. The windows are sashes with plain surrounds.	II
Newhaven Cottage; 53.14697°N 1.76430°W	—	Early 19th century	A farmhouse in rendered stone with gritstone dressings and a hipped tile roof. There are two storeys and three bays. The doorway has a rendered surround and a pointed head. The windows either have a single light, or are mullioned, all with cusped semicircular heads.	II
Newhaven Lodge; 53.16028°N 1.77378°W	—	Early 19th century	A farmhouse in rendered stone with gritstone dressings, quoins, and a roof of tile at the front and stone slate at the rear, with coped gables and plain kneelers. There are two storeys, an L-shaped plan, and a front of three bays. The central doorway has a semicircular head, a quoined surround, a traceried fanlight, imposts, and a projecting keystone. The windows are sashes in plain surrounds.	II
Barn north of Newhaven Lodge; 53.16042°N 1.77384°W	—	Early 19th century	The barn is in limestone with gritstone dressings, quoins, and a stone slate roof with coped gables and plain kneelers. There is a single storey, and the front facing the road contains vents.	II
Outbuildings north of Newhaven Lodge; 53.16056°N 1.77415°W	—	Early 19th century	The outbuildings are in limestone with gritstone dressings, quoins, and a roof partly in stone slate roof and partly in asbestos sheeting, with coped gables and plain kneelers. There are two storeys and an L-shaped plan, with two ranges at right angles with four bays each. Most of the openings have quoined surrounds, and there is an external flight of twelve steps.	II
Bank House; 53.14091°N 1.80936°W		1828	The house is in limestone with gritstone dressings, chamfered quoins, an eaves band, and a stone slate roof with coped gables and plain kneelers. There are three storeys and three bays. The central doorway has a semicircular head, a moulded architrave and imposts, a fanlight with radiating tracery, and a projecting keystone decorated with flowers. The windows are sashes, and between the windows in the top floor is an inscribed and dated elliptical plaque.	II
Nettletor Farmhouse; 53.13933°N 1.81023°W		1830	The farmhouse is in rendered stone, on a plinth, with a sill band, an eaves band, and a tile roof with coped gables and plain kneelers. There are two storeys and three bays. The central doorway has a bracketed hood with reeded moulding, the windows are sashes, and above the central window is a circular dated plaque.	II
Former market hall 53.14086°N 1.80896°W		1836	The market hall, later a shop, is in sandstone with rusticated quoins, sill bands, a moulded eaves cornice, and a slate roof with coped gables. There are three storeys and three bays. The right two bay project under a pedimented gable with an arcade of three segmental arches with moulded imposts on square rusticated piers. In the left bay is an archway with a segmental head. The upper floors contain sash windows with moulded architraves. In the tympanum of the pediment is a decorated plaque with carved figures and the date in Roman numerals.	II
Church View Farmhouse and outbuilding 53.14154°N 1.80853°W		Mid 19th century	The farmhouse and outbuilding are under a continuous roof, and are in limestone with gritstone dressings, quoins, and a stone slate roof, hipped to the east. There are two storeys, an L-shaped plan, and four bays. The central doorway has a flush surround and a bracketed hood, and the windows are sashes. The outbuilding to the east contains a segmental archway with a projecting keystone.	II
Devonshire Arms Inn; 53.14054°N 1.80969°W		Mid 19th century	The public house is in two parts, both with two storeys, and tile roofs with coped gables and plain kneelers. The left part is in gritstone with an eaves band, three bays, a T-shaped plan, the left two bays forming a cross-wing with the gable end facing the square. It contains a doorway with a moulded surround and a flat hood, and the windows are sashes. To the right is a rendered range of five bays, and contains a doorway with a flush surround, and mullioned windows.	II
Milepost south of Newhaven Lodge; 53.16004°N 1.77351°W	—	Mid 19th century	The milepost on the west side of the A515 road is in cast iron. It has a triangular section, curving to a flat back with a segmental head. On the top are the distances to London and Derby, on the curving face is "HARTINGTON PARISH", and on the side faces are the distances to Ashbourne and Buxton, and details of the manufacturer.	II
Milepost south of Newhaven Cottage; 53.14674°N 1.76368°W	—	Mid 19th century	The milepost on the southwest side of the A515 road is in cast iron. It has a triangular section, curving to a flat back with a segmental head. On the top are the distances to London and Derby, on the curving face is "HARTINGTON PARISH", and on the side faces are the distances to Ashbourne and Buxton, and details of the manufacturer.	II
Outbuildings, Mill Lane Farm; 53.14021°N 1.81066°W	—	Mid 19th century	Stables and a hayloft in limestone with gritstone dressings, quoins, and a tile roof. There are two storeys, and external steps lead to the upper floor. The building contains two doorways, windows, and a hayloft door, all with quoined surrounds.	II
Corner House; 53.14087°N 1.81022°W		1877	A pair of houses, later combined, in gritstone with quoins, a moulded eaves cornice, and a tile roof with coped gables. There are two storeys and two bays. In the centre are paired doorways with rectangular fanlights and bracketed hoods. The windows are sashes, and between the upper floor windows is an initialled and dated oval plaque.	II
Wiltshire Villa and Minton House Hotel; 53.14059°N 1.80888°W		1894	A pair of houses, later used for other purposes, in gritstone with a moulded sill band, and a tile roof with coped gables and plain kneelers. There are two storeys and attics, and three bays. In the middle bay is a tall mullioned and transomed stair window, flanked by doorways with chamfered surrounds, inscribed lintels and flat hoods. The outer bays contain three-storey gabled canted bay windows. In the top floor are Venetian windows, and in the other floors the windows are sashes.	II
Hartington War Memorial; 53.14060°N 1.80836°W		1924	The war memorial is in an enclosure by a crossroads. It consists of five limestone boulders, the tallest upright at the rear. Two of the boulders have smooth faces inscribed with the names of those lost in the two World Wars. The boulders are on a paved platform, and enclosed by stone kerbs and chains between posts.	II
