= Hartington railway station =

Former railway station in Derbyshire, England

Coordinates: 53.1467°N 1.7781°W

Hartington
- The restored Hartington signal box beside the Trail, converted into an information centre.

General information
- Location: Derbyshire Dales; England
- Platforms: 2

Other information
- Status: Disused

History
- Original company: London and North Western Railway
- Pre-grouping: London and North Western Railway
- Post-grouping: London, Midland and Scottish Railway

Key dates
- 4 August 1899: Station opened
- 1 November 1954: Closed to regular passengers service
- 7 October 1963: Final closure
Location

Hartington railway station is a former railway station which operated from 1899 to 1963. It was built to serve the village of Hartington (grid reference SK129604) in Derbyshire, south east of Buxton.

== History ==
Hartington station in 1967, after the withdrawal of passenger services

It opened in 1899 some 1 1/2 miles (2.4 km) east of the village of Hartington. It was on the Ashbourne Line built by the LNWR as a branch from the Cromford and High Peak Railway (which ran from Whaley Bridge to Cromford) at Parsley Hay.

To the north of the station is Hand Dale viaduct. It was reported that when digging the foundations for the piers, remains of a lead mine, in which the miners had perished, were discovered.

Platforms and buildings at this station, like the others on this line, were made of timber. From Parsley Hay to Ashbourne, the line was single with passing loops at the stations, but provision was made for doubling, which never occurred.

Like all the stations on the line, it was popular with ramblers, and had both a ladies' and a general waiting room, with a booking office. However, its distance from the village meant that when bus services began, it lost much of its local trade. Like the other intermediate station it had no footbridge so passengers arriving at the entrance and requiring the down platform had to walk to the end and use the barrow crossing. Water for both the station and the nearby Hartington Quarry was brought by rail using a tender.

== Closure ==
Regular passenger services ended in 1954, but excursions continued until 1963. Freight continued until October of that year, the track to Ashbourne finally being lifted in 1964.

The track bed from Ashbourne to Parsley Hay was acquired by Derbyshire County Council in 1968 and the Peak National Park for a cycle and walking route. This, the Tissington Trail, was one of the first of such ventures in the country. Later, Ashbourne Tunnel was acquired by Sustrans.

The station buildings were demolished after closure but the typical LNWR signal box has been preserved as a visitor centre.

Today, this is also an alternative southern starting point of the Pennine Bridleway, joining the main trail at nearby Parsley Hay.

== Route ==
Preceding station	Disused railways	Following station
Parsley Hay; Line and station closed	LNWR; Ashbourne Line	Alsop en le Dale; Line and station closed

== See also ==
- Cromford and High Peak Railway
