= Rocester railway station =

Former railway station in Staffordshire, England

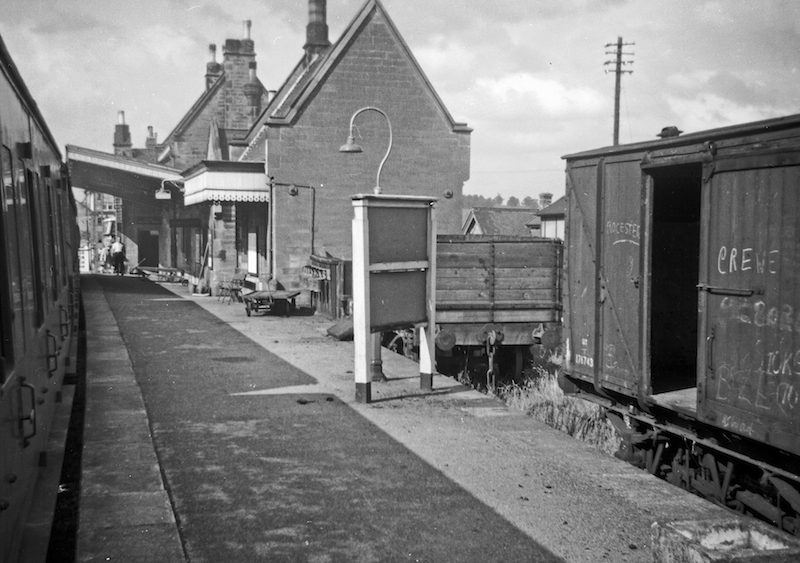
- Rocester station (1959)

General information
- Location: Rocester, East Staffordshire, England
- Coordinates: 52.9499°N 1.8503°W
- Grid reference: SK101391
- Platforms: 2

Other information
- Status: Disused

History
- Original company: North Staffordshire Railway
- Post-grouping: London, Midland and Scottish Railway

Key dates
- 1 August 1849: Opened
- 4 January 1965: Closed
Location

Rocester railway station served the village of Rocester, in Staffordshire, England. It was a stop on the Churnet Valley Line, built by the North Staffordshire Railway (NSR).

== History ==
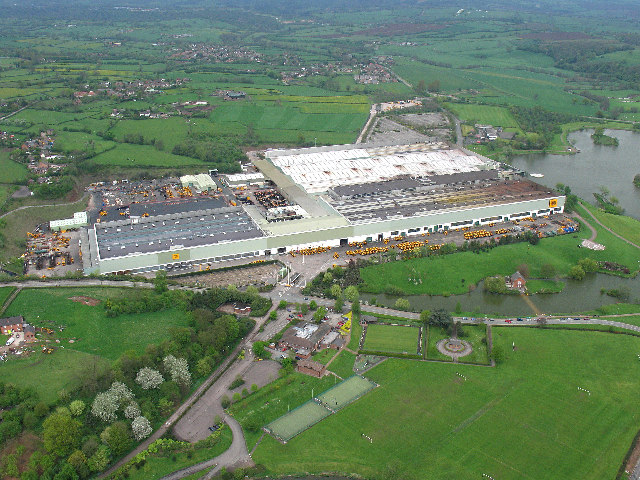
Looking north towards the JCB factory, which lies across the line of the railway. Rocester station was south of the road between the buildings and the trees.

It was opened in 1849 by the NSR on its Churnet Valley Line between North Rode and Uttoxeter. Three years later, it became a junction station when the NSR built a branch to Ashbourne, via Norbury and Ellaston. This was met in 1899 by the Ashbourne Line from Buxton, built by the London and North Western Railway (LNWR).

The aim of the LNWR was to run expresses from Buxton to London, as well as gaining access to Derby and the East Midlands. In fact, the expresses never materialised, being no more than through coaches attached to other trains at Uttoxeter. Even in London, Midland and Scottish Railway days, when the trains ran through from Buxton to Rocester, they were timetabled as different services which included a through coach.

Freight services ended in 1964 and the station was closed in 1965; it was demolished after closure.

Preceding station	Disused railways	Following station
Norbury and Ellaston	North Staffordshire Railway; Ashbourne Line	Uttoxeter
Denstone	North Staffordshire Railway; Churnet Valley Line	Uttoxeter

== The site today ==
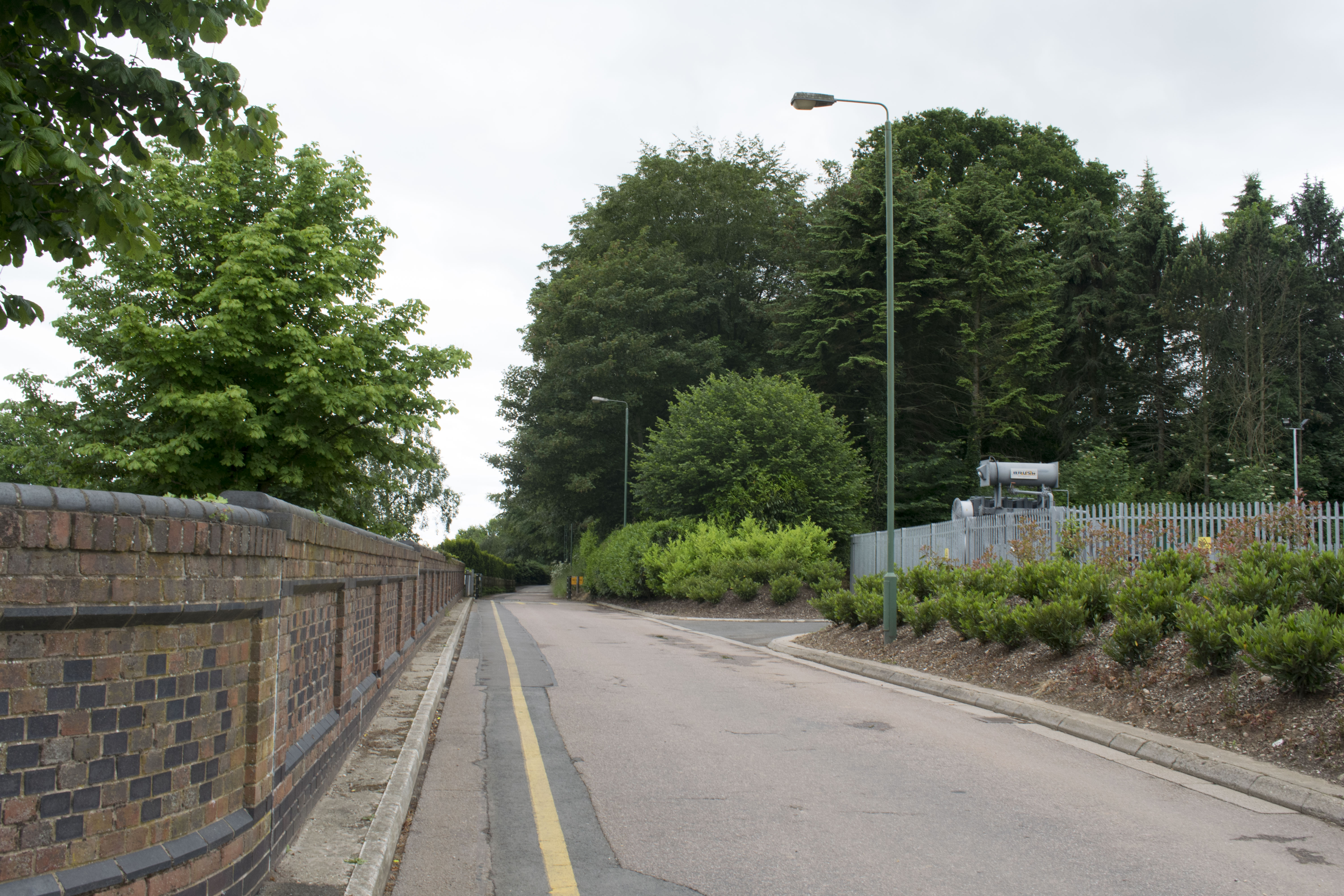
Site of Rocester station in 2018

The site is now a car park.
