= Pennine Bridleway =

National Trail in Northern England

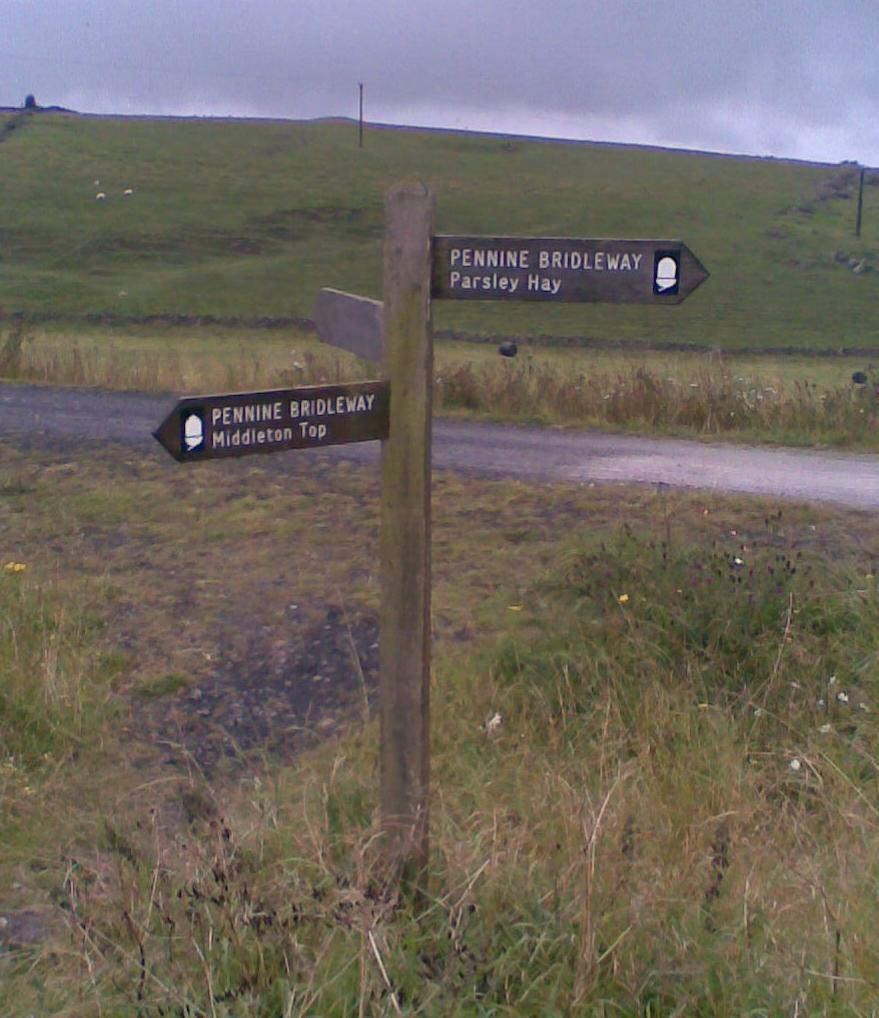
- The Pennine Bridleway signpost near Parsley Hay, where the route on the High Peak Trail is joined by that on the Tissington Trail
- Length: 205 mi (330 km)
- Location: Northern England, United Kingdom
- Designation: UK National Trail
- Trailheads: Middleton-by-Wirksworth, Derbyshire; Ravenstonedale, Cumbria
- Use: Hiking, horseback riding, cycling
- Difficulty: Moderate
- Season: All year

The Pennine Bridleway is a National Trail in Northern England.

It runs roughly parallel with the Pennine Way but provides access for horse riders and cyclists as well as walkers. The trail is around 205 miles (330 km) long, extending from Derbyshire to Cumbria. It includes the 47-mile (76 km) Mary Towneley Loop and the 10-mile (16 km) Settle Loop. In its southern part, it follows the High Peak Trail along the trackbed of the former Cromford and High Peak Railway.

== History ==
In 1986, Mary Towneley rode on horseback 250 miles (402 km) from Corbridge, Northumberland, to Ashbourne, Derbyshire, to launch the idea of a Pennine Bridleway. This was followed by a feasibility study and route investigation from 1987 to 1990. Finally in 1995 approval was granted for the Pennine Bridleway National Trail from Carsington Water, Derbyshire, to Kirkby Stephen, Cumbria.

In 1999, Sport England awarded and donated £1,841,876 towards the route from Derbyshire to North Yorkshire and three feeder routes from Keighley, Bolton and Penistone. The Pennine Bridleway project team was appointed by the Countryside Agency and work began shortly.

In 2000, there was a proposal for an extension to the Pennine Bridleway from Kirkby Stephen, Cumbria, to Byrness, Northumberland. This extension was approved in 2002, but has not yet been funded.

Towneley died in February 2001, and is commemorated by the Mary Towneley Loop, which opened in 2002. The southern section of the trail from Derbyshire followed, and in 2005 the Settle Loop opened. The final sections of the trail were opened by Martin Clunes in June 2012.

The Pennine Bridleway is not to be confused with the Pennine Cycleway (part of the National Cycle Network) or the Pennine Way (a separate National Trail).

== Route ==
=== Derbyshire ===
The Pennine Bridleway has two starting points in Derbyshire. The main starting point is at Middleton-by-Wirksworth, from where it follows the High Peak Trail along a disused railway passing through the limestone of the White Peak. The second starting point, recommended for horse riders, is the site of the former Hartington railway station, and uses a short section of the Tissington Trail before joining the High Peak Trail at Parsley Hay. At the end of the High Peak Trail, 7 kilometres (4 mi) south east of Buxton, the route heads north following the line of a packhorse road from Tideswell, via Peak Forest to Hayfield, where it briefly follows the line of another converted railway, the Sett Valley Trail.

North of Hayfield, there is a gap of 8 kilometres (5 mi) in the bridleway. There are alternative routes for walkers and cyclists, but no safe route for horse riders until the missing section is completed. The route resumes at Bottoms Reservoir near Tintwistle in Longdendale. Spending cuts meant that a 4-kilometre (2.5 mi) gap still existed between Charlesworth and Tintwistle in 2017.

=== Greater Manchester ===
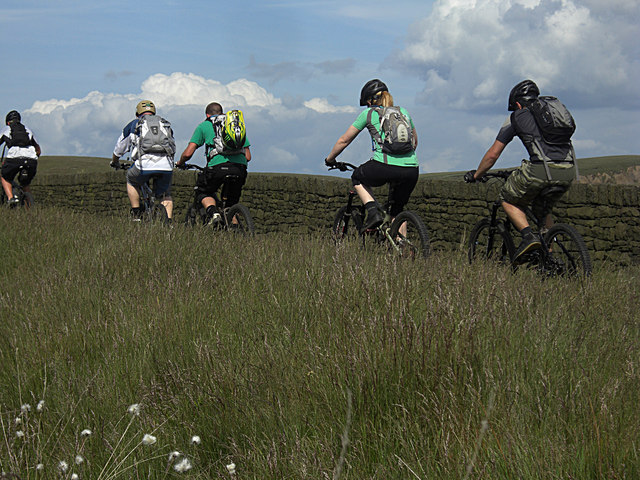
Cyclists on the Pennine Bridleway near Denshaw

Leaving Derbyshire for Greater Manchester, the trail follows the edge of a heather moor and picks up the trackbed of a former railway line along the Tame valley through the tourist village of Uppermill and to the village of Diggle. From here the trail heads west across moorland and descends to follow a dismantled railway towards Hollingworth Lake. It then crosses moorland east of Littleborough before joining the Mary Towneley Loop near Summit.

=== Mary Towneley Loop ===
The shorter route follows the Mary Towneley Loop counterclockwise, heading north into West Yorkshire. The trail passes the villages of Bottomley and Mankinholes, then drops down to cross the Calder Valley just west of the town of Hebden Bridge. It then climbs to cross Heptonstall Moor and enters Lancashire south of Widdop.

The longer clockwise route of the Mary Towneley Loop heads west from Summit and climbs to Top of Leach at 474 metres (1,555 ft). The trail passes through the town of Waterfoot in the Rossendale Valley and follows new tracks via Lumb before entering the Cliviger Gorge and then climbing up to the Long Causeway. It then heads north to the top of the Loop just east of Worsthorne.

=== Lancashire ===
From the top of the Mary Towneley Loop the trail heads north to the village of Wycoller, then turns west to pass south of Earby and Barnoldswick. For several miles it follows an old track named Coal Pit Lane to reach Gisburne Park on the River Ribble. It then heads north across the flatter landscape of the Ribble Valley to enter North Yorkshire just north of the village of Paythorne.

=== North Yorkshire and Cumbria ===
At the southern edge of the Yorkshire Dales the route reaches Long Preston on the busy A65 road. The route through Long Preston and across the A65 has not yet been finalised. The trail heads north from Long Preston to the town of Settle. South of Settle the Settle Loop branches east to rejoin the main route just north of the town.

At Stainforth the route turns west to Feizor, Austwick and Clapham on ancient walled lanes. From Clapham the trail turns north east to Selside and crosses to the east side of Ribblesdale. It then joins the Pennine Way for 7 kilometres (4 mi), climbing Cam Fell. A new trail is then followed west over high and exposed terrain to Newby Head. The route briefly enters Cumbria over Dent Fell, then reenters North Yorkshire at Garsdale Head.

At the head of Wensleydale the route follows an old track (Lady Anne's Way) to cross into the Mallerstang valley in Cumbria. The trail then crosses Wild Boar Fell to reach its present terminus near the village of Ravenstonedale.

== Link routes ==
One feeder route has been opened, and two more are planned:

- The 17-mile (27 km) Calder–Aire Link starts at Bingley in West Yorkshire, and runs through Wilsden and across Oxenhope Moor to join the Mary Towneley Loop near Widdop.
- The 42-mile (68 km) West Pennine Link will run from Smithills Hall near Bolton to join the Mary Towneley Loop near Clowbridge Reservoir in Rossendale.
- The West Pennine Perimeter is planned to join with the West Pennine Link to provide a circular route around the West Pennine Moors.

== See also ==
- Rail trail
- Pennine Cycleway
- Sabrina Way: a bridleway that links southwards through Staffordshire, Shropshire, Worcestershire and Gloucestershire into Oxfordshire
