= Pilsbury =

Coordinates: 53.1649°N 1.8214°W

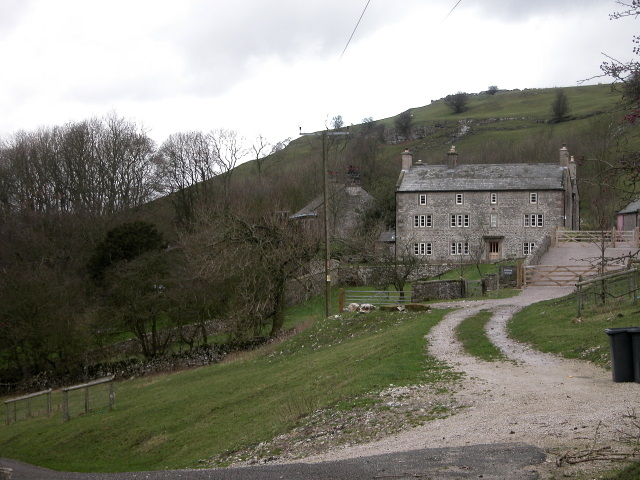
- Pilsbury from the gated road. This substantial farmhouse has extensive views over the valley below.

- Location within Derbyshire
- OS grid reference: SK119631
- District: Derbyshire Dales
- Shire county: Derbyshire
- Region: East Midlands
- Country: England
- Sovereign state: United Kingdom
- Post town: MATLOCK
- Postcode district: SK17
- Police: Derbyshire
- Fire: Derbyshire
- Ambulance: East Midlands

Pilsbury is a hamlet in the English county of Derbyshire, approximately 2 miles north of Hartington. It is on the side of the valley of the River Dove that, thereabouts, forms the border with the county of Staffordshire.

== History ==
Pilsbury was mentioned in the Domesday Book as belonging to Henry de Ferrers and being worth ten shillings. Just to the north of the hamlet is the site of Henry de Ferrers' Pilsbury Castle.
