= Harry Hartington =

English cricketer

Harry Edmondson Hartington (18 September 1881 – 16 February 1950) was an English first-class cricketer, who played ten matches for Yorkshire County Cricket Club in 1910 and 1911. He also appeared for the Yorkshire Second XI from 1903 to 1910, and the Yorkshire Cricket Council in 1903.

Born in Dewsbury, West Riding of Yorkshire, Hartington was a right-arm fast medium bowler, who took 23 wickets at 33.21, with a best of 5 for 81 against Hampshire. A right-handed tail order batsman, he scored 51 runs at 8.50, with a best score of 16 against Northamptonshire.

Hartington died in February 1950, in Pontefract, West Riding of Yorkshire.
