= Longnor =

Longnor may refer to several places in England:

- Longnor, Shropshire, a village and civil parish
- Longnor, Staffordshire, a village and civil parish in the Peak District
- Longnor, South Staffordshire, a location
