= Ashbourne railway station =

Former railway station in Derbyshire, England

Ashbourne
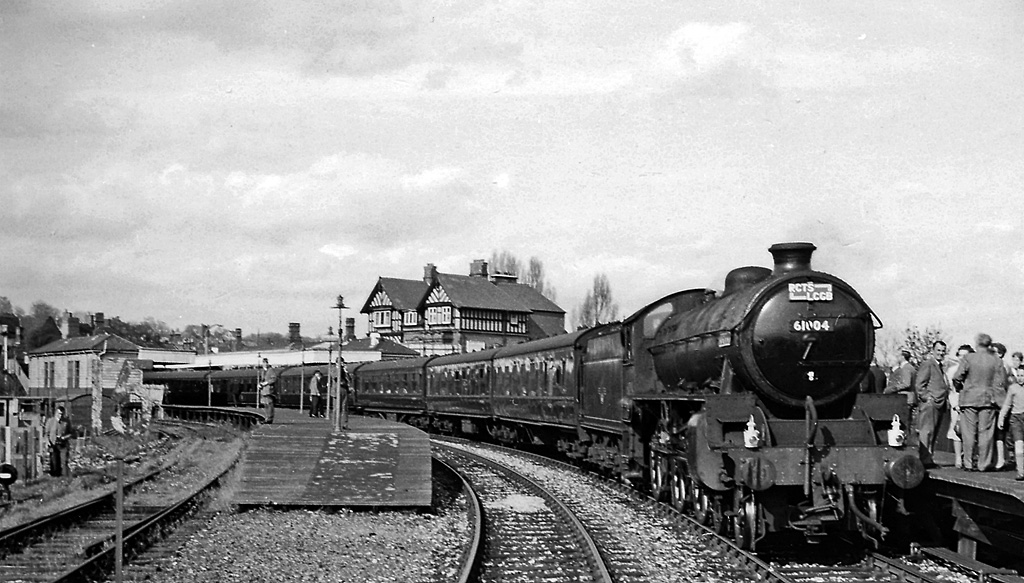
- Ashbourne Station with Rail Tour

General information
- Location: Ashbourne, Derbyshire Dales; England
- Coordinates: 53.01495°N 1.7356°W
- Grid reference: SK178464
- Platforms: 4

Other information
- Status: Disused

History
- Original company: North Staffordshire Railway
- Pre-grouping: LNWR & North Staffordshire Railway Joint
- Post-grouping: London, Midland and Scottish Railway; British Railways

Key dates
- 31 May 1852: NSR station opened
- 4 August 1899: Replaced by joint station
- 1 November 1954: Station closed to regular passenger traffic
- 7 October 1963: Station closed to all traffic
Location

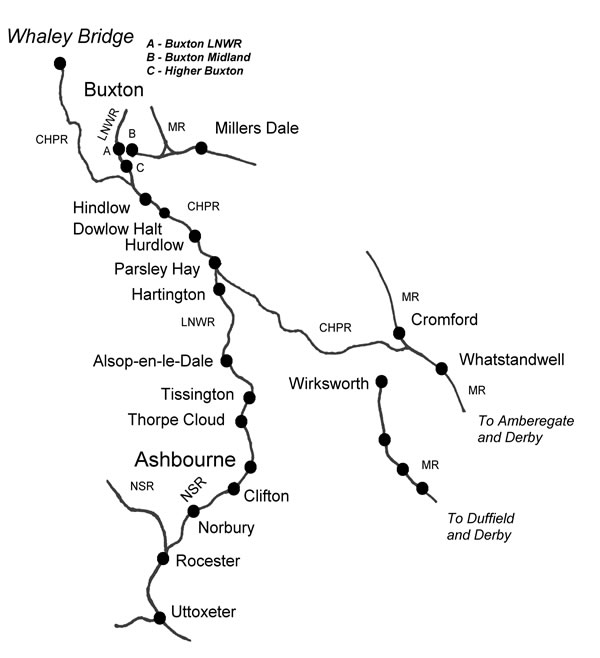
Route of the Ashbourne Line

Ashbourne railway station formerly served the town of Ashbourne in Derbyshire. There have been two stations in the town. The first, opened in 1852, was operated by the North Staffordshire Railway (NSR); it was replaced in 1899 by a station at a new location, jointly operated by the NSR and the London and North Western Railway (LNWR). In 1923 the station passed into the ownership of the London, Midland and Scottish Railway and in 1948 that of the London Midland Region of British Railways. It was finally closed to all traffic in 1963 (regular passenger services having been withdrawn in 1954).

== History ==
The first station was opened in 1852 by the North Staffordshire Railway on its branch from Rocester on its Churnet Valley line. This station was located on Clifton Road at grid reference SK 176 462 and had a single platform.

Most services ran to Uttoxeter although the NSR made arrangements with both the LNWR and the Midland Railway (MR) for services to London. From the 1880s the MR ran a direct through carriage each day from Ashbourne to St Pancras and return while in the 1890s the LNWR ran several trains per day to Nuneaton where passengers could make a single change of journey to Euston.

In 1861 the LNWR took over the Cromford and High Peak Railway and started consideration of an extension of the line from Parsley Hay to Ashbourne which once connected to the NSR line would give the LNWR a direct line between Buxton and London to rival the MR service.

The London and North Western Railway Act 1890 (53 & 54 Vict. c. cliv) which received Royal assent on 4 August 1890 gave the LNWR approval to construct a line from Parsley Hay to Ashbourne and on the same day the NSR and the LNWR were given permission to construct a new joint station at Ashbourne.

It was not until 1898 that construction of the new station began at grid reference SK 178 464 approximately 14 chains (280 m) to the north east of the NSR station which became a goods depot. The new station opened on 4 August 1899. Unlike the earlier station, which had been of brick and stone, the new one was timber construction throughout to a standard LNWR design. Four platforms were provided, two through platforms and two bay platforms. Both bays were for trains arriving and departing in the direction of Uttoxeter. The station was built on a curve and shelter was provided by awnings which extended over the entrance.

The LNWR service initially comprised four trains per day, each way, between Buxton and Ashbourne and a single direct train from Buxton to London each way. This level of local passenger service continued throughout the joint ownership period and into LMS and BR days with most services being Buxton–Ashbourne and Ashbourne–Uttoxeter with only a small number being Buxton–Uttoxeter services.

From Ashbourne towards Thorpe Cloud the line climbed steeply through Ashbourne Tunnel, at 1 in 59. Southwards towards Clifton Mayfield the terrain was more gentle, following the valley of the River Dove.

After the move to a joint station, the line became part of the London, Midland and Scottish Railway during the Grouping of 1923. The station then passed on to the London Midland Region of British Railways on nationalisation in 1948.

From 1910, Nestle had a creamery in the town, which for a period was contracted to produce Carnation condensed milk. The factory had its own private sidings connected to the station's goods yard, which allowed milk trains to access the facility, and distribute product as far south as London.

It was closed to regular passenger traffic in 1954 by the British Transport Commission although excursions continued until 1963. Freight continued until October of that year, with the track finally being lifted in 1964.

== Preservation ==
The track bed from Ashbourne to Parsley Hay was acquired by Derbyshire County Council and the Peak National Park in 1968 for a cycle and walking route. This, the Tissington Trail, was one of the first of such ventures in the country. Later, Ashbourne Tunnel was acquired by Sustrans.

The former railway station site is now a car park for Ashbourne's Leisure Centre and the site of the original station and goods yard is now occupied by the new St.Oswald's Hospital. The Grade II-listed goods shed is still standing and is currently occupied by a steel merchant. A vestige of the station forecourt can still be seen in a wide filled-in pavement area directly opposite the Station Hotel. The course of the line as it heads southwards towards Uttoxeter has been partly interrupted by a retail park, but it can be traced to the rear of the retail park via a culvert under the A52, through a still-existing short cutting and then along a low embankment into the village of Clifton, and can then still be traced all the way to Rocester.

== Route ==
Preceding station	Disused railways	Following station
Clifton Mayfield	North Staffordshire Railway	Terminus
Terminus	LNWR; Ashbourne Line	Thorpe Cloud

== See also ==
- Ashbourne Line
