= Hartington Hall =

Manor house in Derbyshire, England

Coordinates: 53°08′25″N 1°48′17″W

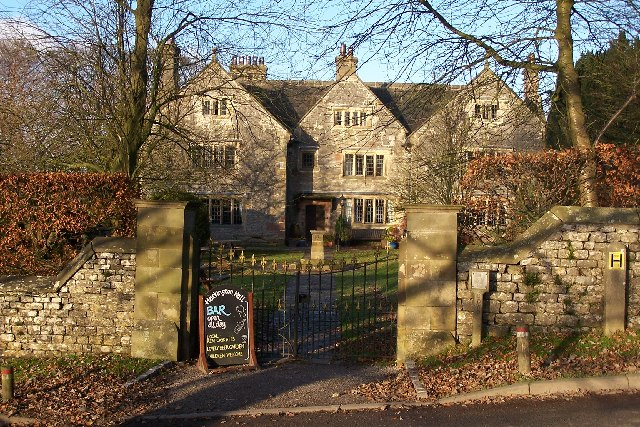
Hartington Hall Youth Hostel

Hartington Hall is a much altered and extended 17th-century manor house at Hartington, Derbyshire, now a youth hostel.

The Hall was built by the Bateman family. They were a well-established Norfolk family who settled at Hartington in the 16th century. Richard Bateman married Ellen Toplis of Tissington and it was their eldest son, Hugh, who built the new manor house at Hartington in 1611. In 1862 Thomas Osborne Bateman oversaw the substantial alteration and extension. The work was carried out by Henry Isaac Stevens of Derby.

The house is built to an H plan: the main entrance front has three storeys and three gabled bays, the central bay recessed with an off-centre porch entrance. The dates of building and alterations are recorded on a lintel above the door. It is now a Grade II listed building.

The Batemans remained at Hartington until the 20th century. In 1934 the property was opened as a youth hostel by the Youth Hostels Association (YHA) and became the property of YHA in 1948. Though it retains dormitory accommodation, it has many small rooms with ensuite facilities. There is a restaurant on site, open to the public as well as guests. A popular wedding venue, it also has a bridal suite. It has been claimed that Bonnie Prince Charlie stayed at the Hall during the Jacobite rising of 1745.

== See also ==
- Listed buildings in Hartington Town Quarter

== See also ==
- Hostel
