= Hartington, Derbyshire =

Village in Derbyshire, England

Coordinates: 53.14095°N 1.80846°W

Hartington
- Hartington

- Location within Derbyshire
- Population: 332 (Town Quarter Civil Ward 2011)
- OS grid reference: SK129604
- District: Derbyshire Dales
- Shire county: Derbyshire
- Region: East Midlands
- Country: England
- Sovereign state: United Kingdom
- Post town: BUXTON
- Postcode district: SK17
- Dialling code: 01298
- Police: Derbyshire
- Fire: Derbyshire
- Ambulance: East Midlands
- UK Parliament: Derbyshire Dales

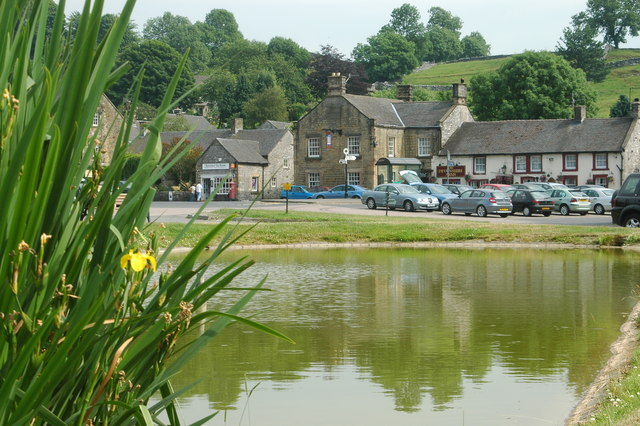
The pond in the centre of Hartington

Hartington is a village in the centre of the White Peak area of the Derbyshire Peak District, England, lying on the River Dove which is the Staffordshire border. According to the 2001 census, the parish of Hartington Town Quarter, which also includes Pilsbury, had a population of 345 reducing to 332 at the 2011 Census. Formerly known for cheese-making and the mining of ironstone, limestone and lead, the village is now popular with tourists.

== Architecture ==
Notable buildings in the village include the market hall (formerly the site of a market), the 13th-century parish church of Saint Giles, and the 17th-century Hartington Hall. The prominent Bank House in the centre of the village was built by the former village mill owner, and in the past was used as the village bank. A half-mile (800 m) to the south of the village, on the river Dove, is the fishing house of the famous angler Charles Cotton. In the north of the village is Pilsbury Castle, an 11th-century motte-and-bailey castle, that survives only as an earthwork.

Near Hartington is the finest neolithic stone circle in the Peak District, Arbor Low. There are numerous ancient tumuli and cairns in the landscape around Hartington, probably dating from the Bronze Age.

Hartington Mill, now a private house, stands by the River Dove. This was the local water mill for grinding corn.

== Attractions ==
The village has a youth hostel at Hartington Hall, which serves two major National Cycle Network routes: the Tissington Trail and the High Peak Trail, which meet at nearby Parsley Hay. These trails pass just under one mile (1500 m) to the east of the village; they offer 30 miles (50 km) of off-road cycling and walking along old railway trackbeds through the Peak District National Park. Hartington signal box, on the site of the former Hartington railway station and nearly two miles (3 km) from the village, has been renovated and converted into a visitor centre; there is also a car park on site.

A little south of the village, overlooking the Dove, stands Wolfscote Hill (388 m at grid reference SK137583) which is a good viewpoint; it is now in the care of the National Trust.

Three miles (5 km) to the south-west of the village lies the small settlement of Hulme End; this marks the northern starting point of the Manifold Way, an 8-mile (13 km) tarmacked walking and cycling route that follows the route of the former Leek and Manifold Valley Light Railway.

== History ==
According to the English Place-Name Society the name of the village derives from the Old English for either 'Stags' hill' or 'hill connected with Heorta'. Hartington was mentioned in the Domesday Book as belonging to Henry de Ferrers and being worth forty shillings. The parish was originally quite large, and part of the hundred of Wirksworth. Hartington had four townships, known as the Town Quarter, Nether Quarter, and Middle Quarter, and Upper Quarter, which are now all separate parishes. These became separate civil parishes in their own right in 1866. They are marked on Ordnance Survey maps. Surnames that originate from this area include Heathcote.

=== Railway ===
Hartington railway station, on the Cromford and High Peak Railway, was opened in 1899; it was sited on the part of the line that ran from Buxton to Ashbourne. Regular passenger services ceased in 1954, due to low passenger numbers, and the line through Hartington was lifted in 1964.

Much of the line has since been converted to a shared-use path called the Tissington Trail. Hartington signal box has been retained and is now used as an information centre.

== Cheese ==
The creamery in the village, often called the cheese factory, was founded by the Duke of Devonshire in the 1870s; it was one of the three sources of Stilton, and also produced its own unique Dovedale cheese and others such as Buxton Blue cheese. The factory was closed in 2009 after being sold by Dairy Crest to the Long Clawson Dairy Company, but the cheese shop associated with the factory re-opened under private ownership, and a new, smaller, creamery was opened by two former employees in 2014.

== Notable residents ==
- James Redfern, (1838–1876), sculptor, his works were incorporated into Gothic churches,
- Marie Litton (1846–1884), English actress and theatre manager.
- John Oliver (1856–1927), British-Canadian politician and 19th. premier of British Columbia
- Steve Sutton (born 1961), football goalkeeper, played 331 games including 199 for Nottingham Forest

== See also ==
- Listed buildings in Hartington Town Quarter
