= Parsley Hay railway station =

Former railway station in Derbyshire, England

Parsley Hay
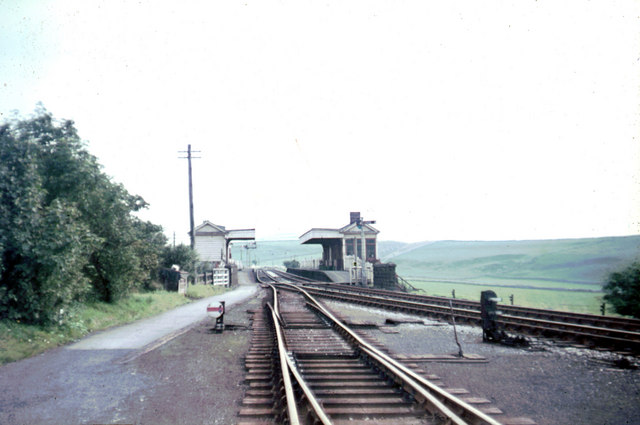
- Parsley Hay railway station in 1963

General information
- Location: Hartington Middle Quarter civil parish, Derbyshire Dales; England
- Coordinates: 53.1702°N 1.78305°W
- Grid reference: SK146637
- Platforms: 2

Other information
- Status: Disused

History
- Original company: Cromford and High Peak Railway
- Pre-grouping: London and North Western Railway
- Post-grouping: London, Midland and Scottish Railway

Key dates
- June 1833: Station opened for goods
- July 1856: Opened for passengers
- December 1877: closed
- 1 June 1894: reopened LNWR
- 4 August 1899: New station
- 1 November 1954: Closed to regular passenger services
- 7 October 1963: Final closure
Location

Parsley Hay railway station served Parsley Hay, a hamlet within Hartington Middle Quarter civil parish, about 9.3 miles (15 km) south east of Buxton, Derbyshire, on the LNWR line to Ashbourne. The nearest large settlement is the village of Hartington.

== History ==
It was originally opened in 1833 for goods by the Cromford and High Peak Railway (which ran from Whaley Bridge to Cromford). It opened for passengers in 1856 but closed in 1877. The line was acquired by LNWR and extended to Buxton in 1894 and the station was reopened. In 1899 the LNWR built a junction just south of the station for a line to Ashbourne and built a new station.

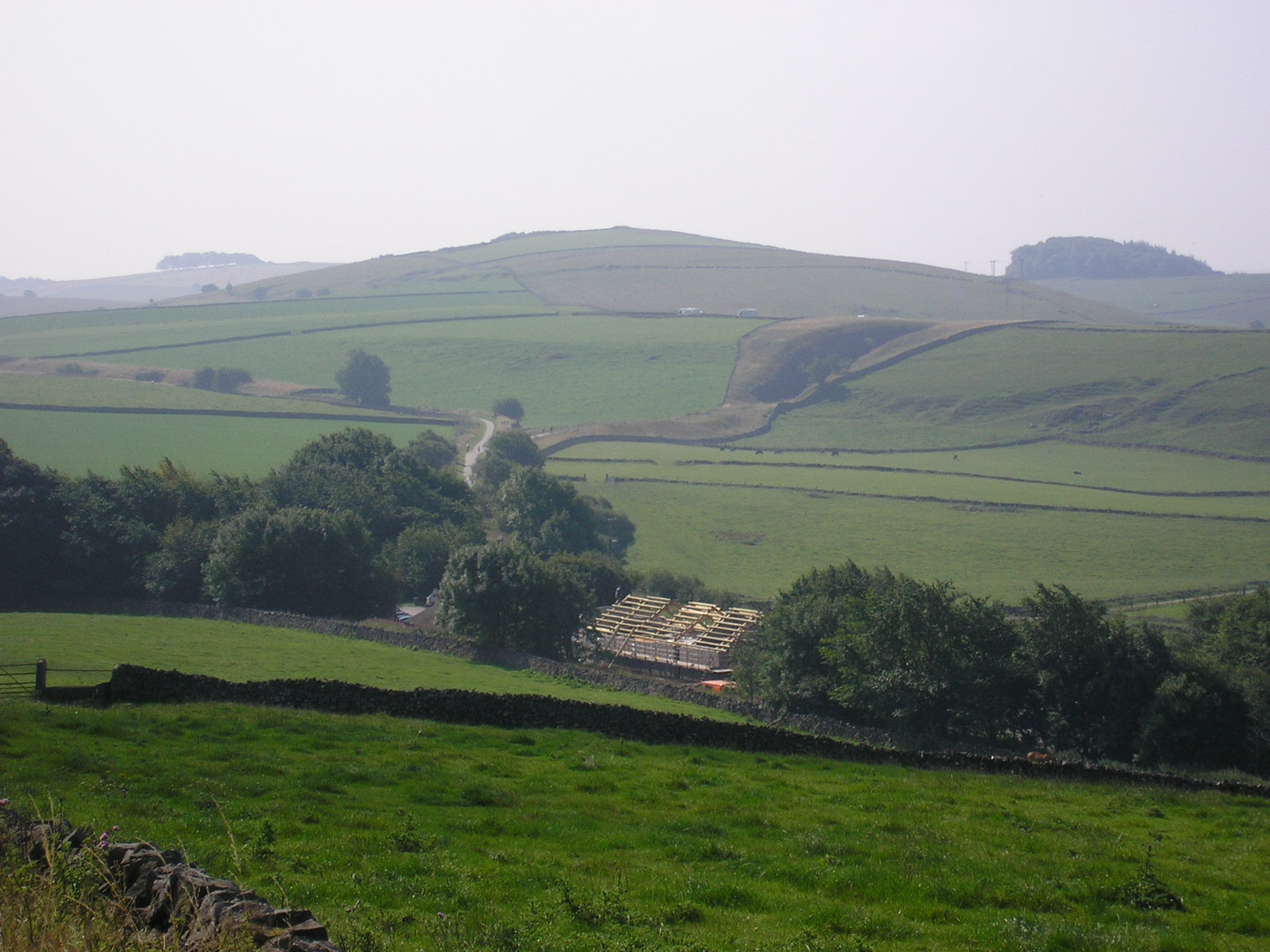
Parsley Hay station, showing the Tissington Trail winding southwards

In common with the other stations on this line, the platforms and buildings were of timber construction. From this point on to Ashbourne the line was single with passing loops at the stations, though provision was made for doubling which never occurred.

In contrast to the first part of the line from Buxton, from the previous station at Hurdlow the line had dropped gently and this continued to the next at Hartington, though the curves involved limited the linespeed to 40 miles per hour (64.4 km/h).

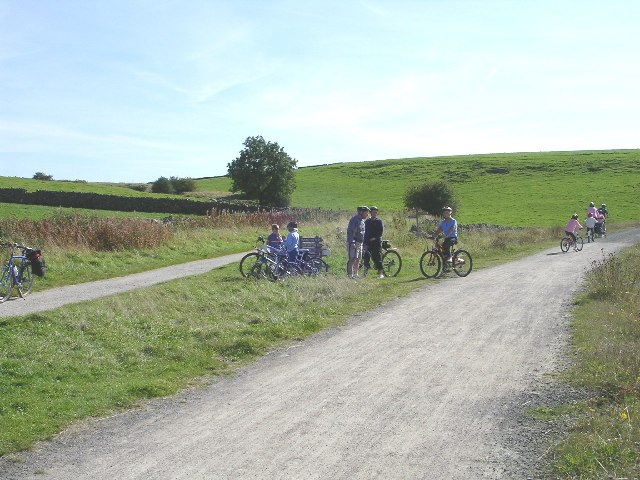
The meeting of the Tissington & High Peak Trails at Parsley Hay.

Regular passenger services ceased in 1954 but excursions and special trains continued until October, 1963 while the line southwards closed in October, 1967 with that to Hindlow following in November.

Today these two disused trackbeds form the route of two walking and cycling routes. The High Peak Trail follows the old Cromford and High Peak, and the name Parsley Hay has become synonymous with the cycle centre here.

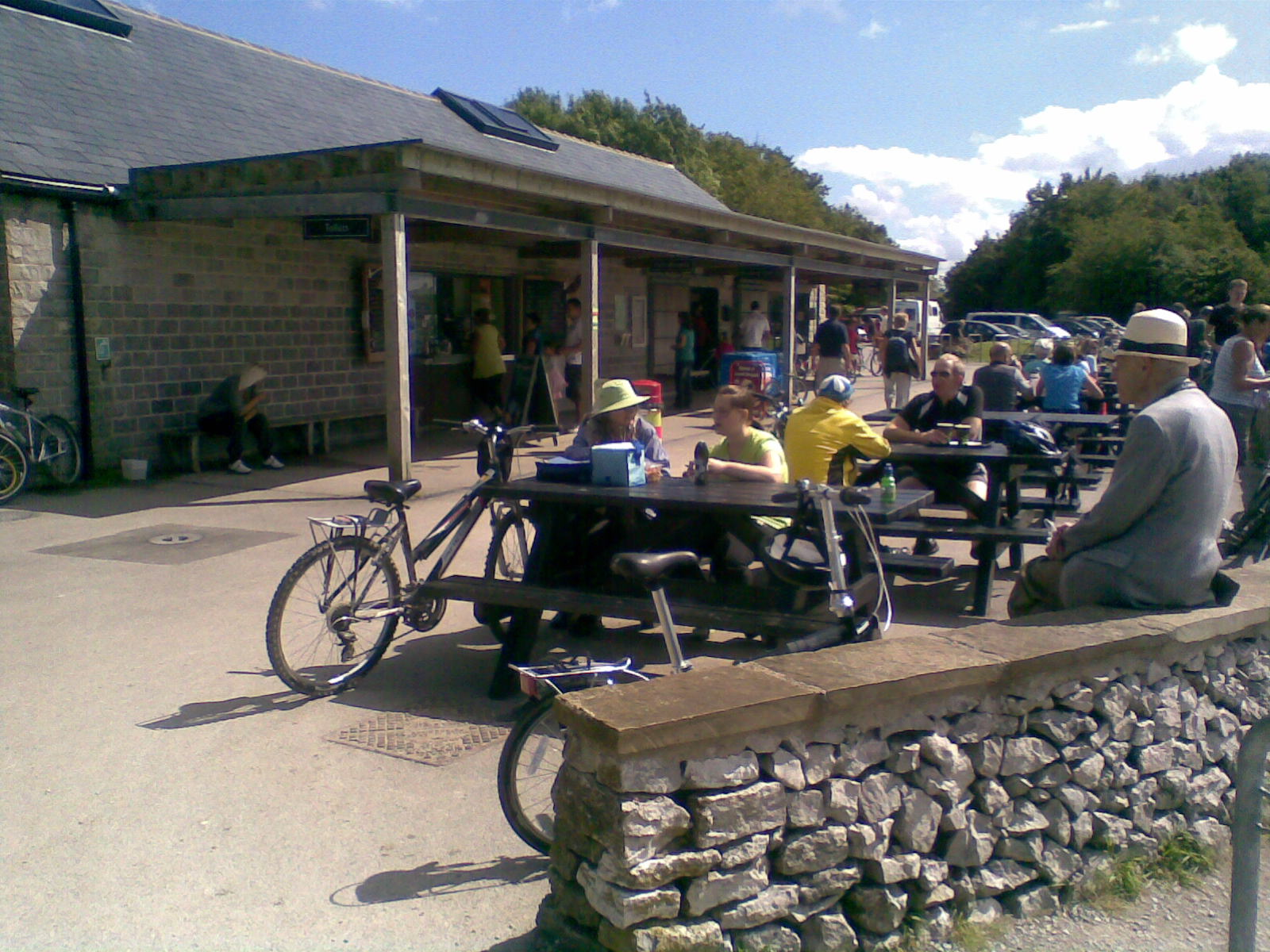
The cycle-hire centre at Parsley Hay on a busy August weekend.

The track bed from Ashbourne to Parsley Hay was acquired by Derbyshire County Council and the Peak National Park to become the Tissington Trail which was one of the first of such ventures in the country. Later, Ashbourne Tunnel was acquired by Sustrans. Parsley Hay, being located a little to the north of the junction of these walk/cycleways, is ideally located for a cycle hire centre (run by the Park Authority) and a refreshment kiosk serving drinks and snacks all day. There are also toilets here, and a large car park.

The trackbed at this point is also part of the Pennine Bridleway, a 130-mile (209.2 km) leisure route which includes 73 miles (117.5 km) through Derbyshire.

== Route ==
Preceding station	Disused railways	Following station
Hurdlow; Line and station closed	Cromford and High Peak Railway	Friden; Line and station closed
Hurdlow; Line and station closed	LNWR; Ashbourne Line	Hartington; Line and station closed

== See also ==
- Cromford and High Peak Railway
