= Ashbourne line =

Disused railway line in Derbyshire, England

Coordinates: 53.08044°N 1.75322°W

The Ashbourne line was a 33 1/2 mi (53.9 km) railway from Buxton via Ashbourne to Uttoxeter. It was built by the London and North Western Railway (LNWR) using a section of the Cromford and High Peak Railway (C&HPR) and it joined the North Staffordshire Railway (NSR) at Ashbourne, proceeding to Uttoxeter with a junction onto the main line at Rocester.

== Origins ==
North Staffordshire Railway (Ashbourne Branch) Act 1848
- Act of Parliament
- Parliament of the United Kingdom
- Long title: An Act for making a Branch Railway from the Churnet Valley Line of the North Staffordshire Railway in the Parish of Rocester in the County of Stafford to Ashbourne in the County of Derby.
- Citation: 11 & 12 Vict. c. lxxxiii

Dates
- Royal assent: 22 July 1848

Text of statute as originally enacted

Although the country between Buxton and Ashbourne was sparsely populated, and the terrain immensely difficult, there were a number of motivations for its construction. Ashbourne was one of the few large settlements in the area without a railway connection until the North Staffordshire Railway (NSR) built its branch from the Churnet Valley line in 1852, authorised by the North Staffordshire Railway (Ashbourne Branch) Act 1848 (11 & 12 Vict. c. lxxxiii). Meanwhile, a lucrative trade in limestone was building up and the LNWR's only route southwards was through the Manchester area. Finally, and not least, the Midland Railway was threatening to take over the Derbyshire business through its attempts to reach Manchester from Derby via Buxton.

- A Branch Railway commencing by a Junction with the said Churnet Valley Line as at present authorized to be made in the Parish of Rocester and County of Stafford, and terminating at or near the Town of Ashhourne in the Parish of Ashbourne and County of Derby.
— Section 4, North Staffordshire Railway (Ashbourne Branch) Act 1848 (11 & 12 Vict. c. lxxxiii)

The LNWR sought to consolidate its position by building a line southwards across the Midland's path. Both railways had arrived at Buxton almost simultaneously in 1863, with termini adjacent to each other (and Buxton lost its chance to be served by a mainline railway).

The LNWR had leased the Cromford and High Peak Railway in 1861 and in the London and North-western Railway (England and Ireland) Act 1874 (37 & 38 Vict. c. clix) it gained permission to link Buxton with the C&HPR at Hindlow Junction just south of Harpur Hill, which it reached in 1892. At the other end, it would build High Peak Junction near Cromford. After some delay, the London and North Western Railway Act 1887 (50 & 51 Vict. c. cxxxi) was obtained, in addition, allowed the complete takeover of the High Peak line. Services began to Parsley Hay on 1 June 1894.

- The Buxton and High Peak Junctions (two in number), to be wholly situate in the county of Derby; (that is to say,)
  - No. 1 (five miles one furlong five chains and twenty-five links in length), commencing in the township of Fairfield in the parish of Hope, in the county of Derby, by a junction with the Company's branch railway to Buxton, north of the booking office at their passenger station at Buxton, and terminating in the township of Hartington-Upper-Quarter, in the parish of Hartington, in the same county, by a junction with the Company's Cromford and High Peak Railway seventy yards, or thereabouts, south-east of the distance post on that railway denoting nineteen miles:
  - No. 2 (seven furlongs six chains and fifty links in length), to be wholly situate in the said township of Hartington-Upper-Quarter, commencing by a junction with the Company's Cromford and High Peak Railway one hundred and sixty yards, or thereabouts, north of the distance post on that railway denoting twenty-three miles, and terminating by a junction with railway No. 1 five hundred yards, or thereabouts, south-west of that part of the public road leading from Buxton by Parks Inn and Haslin House to Winster which is two thousand yards, or thereabouts, south-east of Parks Inn:
— Section 4, London and North-western Railway (England and Ireland) Act 1874 (37 & 38 Vict. c. clix)

The 13 mi (21 km) section from Parsley Hay to Ashbourne was authorised by the London and North Western Railway Act 1890 (53 & 54 Vict. c. cliv) of 4 August 1890, the building contract awarded to Naylor Brothers on 10 December 1895, and it was opened on 4 August 1899. A new Ashbourne station was built jointly by the NSR and the LNWR. The Station Hotel (known as The Beresford Arms for some time, but which has now reverted to its original name) dates from this time.

- A railway (to be called the Ashbourne and Buxton Railway) thirteen miles three furlongs two chains and ninety-five links in length commencing in the township of Clifton in the parish of Ashbourne in the county of Derby by a junction with the Ashbourne branch of the North Staffordshire Railway at or near the termination of that branch and terminating in the township of Hartington Middle Quarter in the parish of Hartington in the same county by a junction with the Company's Cromford and High Peak Railway.
— Section 4, London and North Western Railway Act 1890 (53 & 54 Vict. c. cliv)

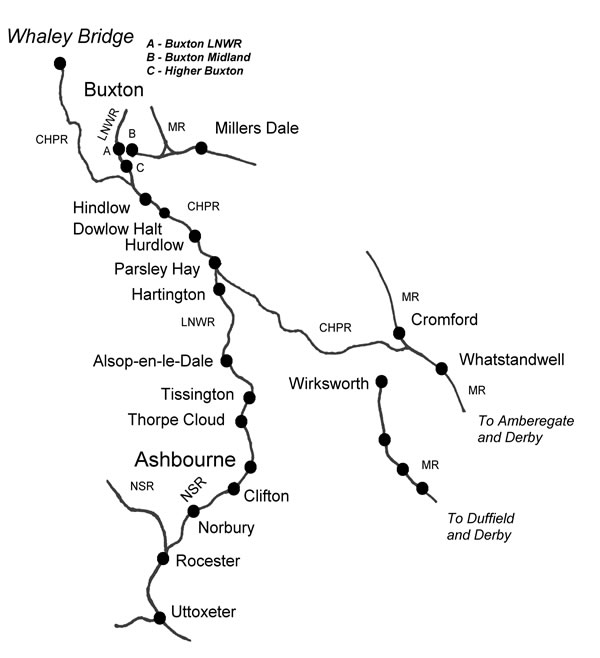
Route of the railway

== Construction ==
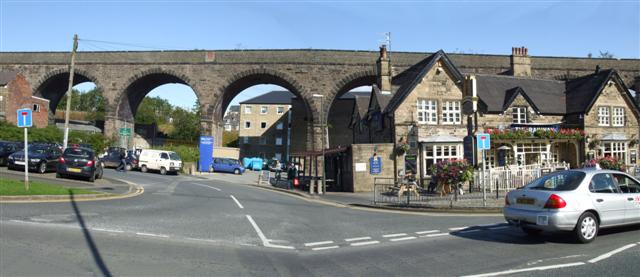
Hogshaw Viaduct at Buxton

Buxton station having been built as a terminus facing north it was first necessary to proceed around a tight 180-degree curve over the 15-arch Hogshaw Viaduct, with a gradient as steep as 1 in 62 (16.1‰), to the station at Higher Buxton. On leaving the town the line passed over 13-arch Dukes Drive Viaduct, and then climbed steadily at 1 in 62 (16.1‰) to Beswick's Sidings. The gradient eased from there to Hindlow, where the line joined the C&HPR. It then climbed once more at 1 in 60 (16.7‰), through the 514 yd (470 m) Hindlow Tunnel, to the summit of the line at Dowlow, a height of 1,260 ft (380 m) above sea level, making it the highest public line in England at that time. This section still exists, serving various lime works at Hindlow and Dowlow.

From there the line fell at 1 in 60 (16.7‰) to Hurdlow (for Longnor and Monyash), but then the gradient eased considerably to Parsley Hay, where it left the C&HPR. From there to Ashbourne the line was single, with passing loops at all stations except Thorpe Cloud, and although the line was initially fairly level it included a number of tight curves. The next stop was Hartington, where after about a couple of miles the line began to fall steeply again at 1 in 60 (16.7‰) through Alsop en le Dale, Tissington, Fenny Bentley, where there was a goods depot, and Thorpe Cloud, and finally through 378 yd (346 m) Church St tunnel to Ashbourne.

It can be seen that the gradients and curves meant that it was always a difficult line to work, particularly during winter when it was exposed to the elements on the high moors. By contrast, the line from Ashbourne southwards was relatively easy, following river valleys as it did, first the Henmore Brook and then the River Dove.

== History ==
Hartington station in 1967, showing LNWR wooden station building architecture typical of the line

There were regular trains from Ashbourne to Derby.

Baedeker for 1890 gives the following information:

Railway from Ashbourne to Derby, 30 M., in 1¼–2 hours (fares 2s.6d., 2s., 1s. 3d.) – 5M Norbury with a highly interesting church (14-15cent; fine stained-glass) and an ancient manor house – At 7M Rocester( rail, refreshment rooms) the pretty 'Churnet Valley line' diverges to the right; the first station on it is (3½M) Alton – 11M Uttoxeter 19M Tutbury – 30M Derby

Once the line to Parsley Hay was open in 1899, there were six trains a day between Buxton and Ashbourne, but the expected expresses were no more than through coaches being attached to London trains. Until 1914 it was possible to travel the 168 1/2 mi (271.2 km) from Euston to Buxton in 4hr 24min. Nevertheless, it was valuable for freight, not only minerals, but milk and other farm produce. Moreover, it became a lifeline during the winter snowstorms: two years after the line opened, a train of six-wheeled carriages became derailed by the snow and was marooned for three days, during which time the crew were given hot food and drinks by local farmers. This camaraderie ensured that the trains would always get through somehow.

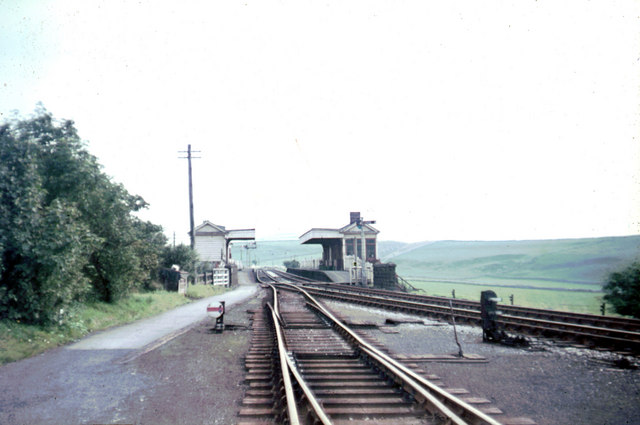
Parsley Hay station, 1963

Throughout its existence it served townsfolk who wished to explore the countryside, and country folk who wanted to visit town. Regular passenger services finished on 30 October 1954, but specials and excursions of various kinds continued until 1963. in its last years the line was worked by a LMS Fowler 2-6-2T and 2 coaches.

In the same year, freight traffic finished between Ashbourne and Hartington, to Rocester in 1964, from Hartington to Parsley Hay in October 1967, and to Hindlow the following month.

== Preservation ==
Although all trace of the old NSR lines has practically disappeared, the track bed from Ashbourne to Parsley Hay was acquired by Derbyshire County Council and the Peak National Park for a cycle and walking route. This, the Tissington Trail, was one of the first of such ventures in the country. Later, Ashbourne Tunnel was acquired by Sustrans.

The line is still open from Buxton to Hindlow for stone traffic from the Buxton lime industry and Lafarge Dowlow.

== Bibliography ==
- Kingscott, G., (2007) Lost Railways of Derbyshire, Newbury: Countryside Books
- Bentley, J.M., Fox, G.K., (1997) Railways of the High Peak: Buxton to Ashbourne (Scenes From The Past series 32), Romiley: Foxline Publishing
