= John Mee =

John Mee may refer to:

- John Mee (priest) (1824–1883), inaugural dean of Grahamstown in South Africa
- John Henry Mee (1852–1918), his son, Oxford clergyman, composer and author
- John Mee (poet) (born 1965), Canadian-Irish poet and law academic

== See also ==
- Jack Mee (Robert John Mee; 1867–1941), English cricketer
