= Bunsail railway station =

Railway station in Derbyshire, England

Bunsail railway station was a minor railway station located on the Cromford and High Peak Railway near Buxton in Derbyshire. Located on a line mostly used for mineral and quarry traffic. It opened to passengers in 1855 and closed in 1876 due to relatively but not uncommon low usage. The goods station then closed in 1967 along with the rest of the line. And today, nothing remains of the station. The trackbed and tunnel are still traceable on maps but have returned to mostly agriculture and minor roads.

== Route ==
Preceding station	Disused railways	Following station
Ladmanlow	Cromford and High Peak Railway	Shallcross
Ladmanlow	Cromford and High Peak Railway	Whaley Bridge
