= Ironville =

Village in Derbyshire, England

Coordinates: 53.063°N 1.350°W

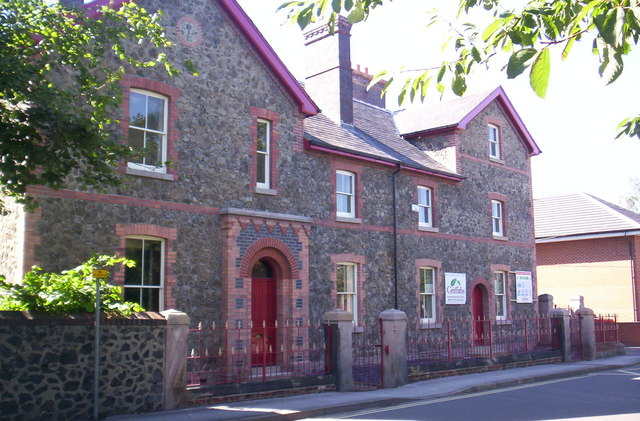
- A doctor's house, built by the local mineowner from iron slag. The first doctor appointed (who was due to marry the mineowner's daughter) died in an accident.

- Location within Derbyshire
- Population: 1,930 (2021)
- OS grid reference: SK436519
- District: Amber Valley
- Shire county: Derbyshire
- Region: East Midlands
- Country: England
- Sovereign state: United Kingdom
- Post town: NOTTINGHAM
- Postcode district: NG16
- Dialling code: 01773
- Police: Derbyshire
- Fire: Derbyshire
- Ambulance: East Midlands

Ironville in Derbyshire, England, was built about 1830 by the Butterley Company as a model village to house its workers. The population of the civil parish was 1,930 at the 2021 Census. It is situated between Riddings and Codnor Park.

John Wright and William Jessop had purchased the land adjacent to the Cromford Canal from Lancelot Rolleston of Watnall in 1809.

The village was notable for its large gardens, and its rural setting. The Mechanics Institute was built in 1846; schools were provided in 1850 and a parish church in 1852.

The local authority modernised parts of the village in the late twentieth century.

Nearby is Pye Hill and the bend in the Cromford Canal where it turns southward down the Erewash Valley and the junction with its extension to Pinxton.

About a quarter of a mile north east is another transport landmark, Pye Bridge at the junction of the Erewash Valley railway line and the extension to Ambergate. Part of the line to Ambergate is now preserved as Midland Railway - Butterley, which terminates just south of the former Pye Bridge Station.

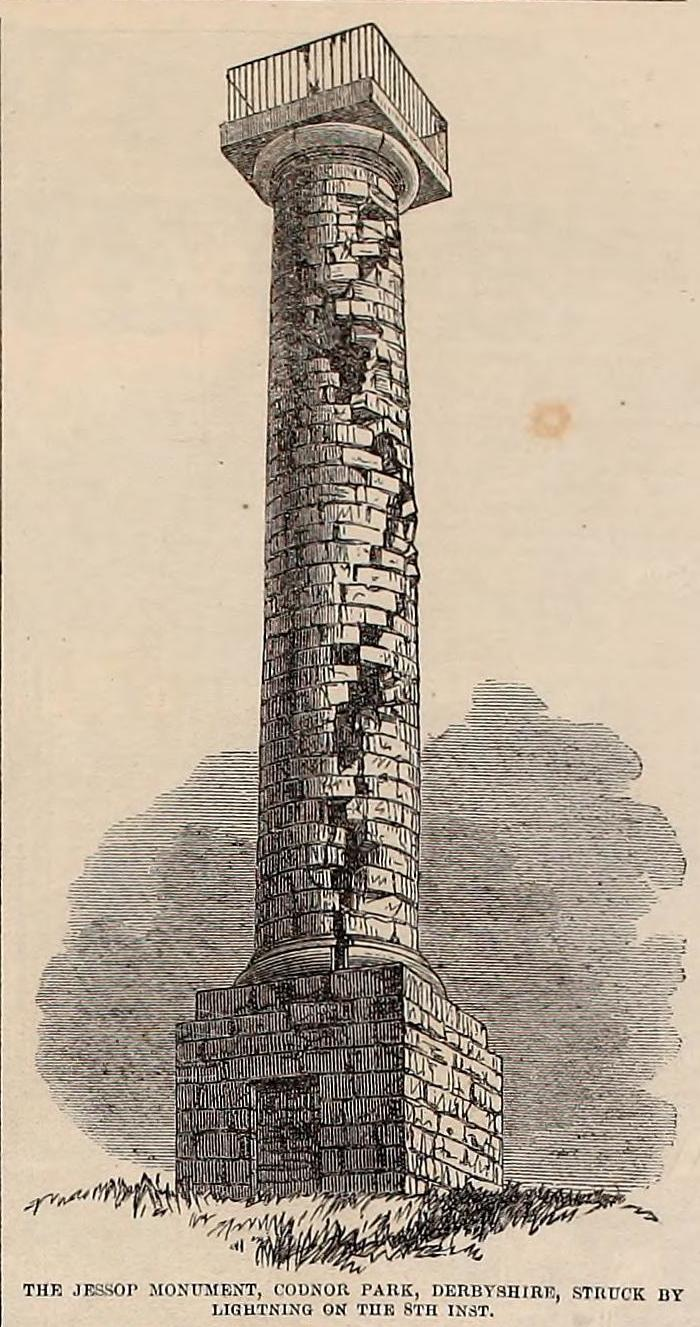
The Jessop Monument made national news when hit by lightning on 8 July 1861

== Notable people ==
- William Wood-Sims (1858–1926), cricketer who played 25 first-class cricket matches for Derbyshire
- John Davis (1882–1963), footballer who played 138 games for Derby County
- Frank Tarr (1887–1915), rugby union player, played 94 games for Leicester Tigers and 4 games for England
- Walter Tinsley (1891–1966), footballer who played 212 games including 61 for Nottingham Forest

== See also ==
- Listed buildings in Ironville
- Listed buildings in Ironville and Riddings Ward
