= Listed buildings in Ironville and Riddings Ward =

Ironville and Riddings is a ward in the Amber Valley district of Derbyshire, England. The ward contains 15 listed buildings that are recorded in the National Heritage List for England. Of these, one is listed at Grade II*, the middle of the three grades, and the others are at Grade II, the lowest grade. The ward contains the village of Riddings, part of the model village of Ironville, and the surrounding area. In Riddings was a model farm, and buildings forming part of this are listed. Other listed buildings include a church, houses, farmhouses and associated structures, public houses, and workers' cottages along the Cromford Canal.

== Key ==
| Grade | Criteria |
|---|---|
| II* | Particularly important buildings of more than special interest |
| II | Buildings of national importance and special interest |

== Buildings ==
| Name and location | Photograph | Date | Notes | Grade |
|---|---|---|---|---|
| Moulders Arms; 53.06950°N 1.35859°W | | 17th century | A public house in rendered brick with tiled coped gables and a thatched roof. There are two storeys and three bays. On the front is a porch with a thatched roof, and the windows are small-paned. | II |
| Knowts Hall Farmhouse; 53.05422°N 1.37500°W | — | 1666 | The farmhouse is in stone, and was refronted in brick in 1772. It has quoins and a tile roof, three storeys and five bays. In the ground floor is a doorway, a blocked opening with a segmental head, and three bow windows. Most of the other windows are sashes, in the west gable wall are two two-light chamfered and mullioned windows, and two datestones. | II |
| 23 to 33 Stone Row; 53.05722°N 1.36512°W | | Late 18th century | Originally 20 workers' cottages in stone with a slate roof facing the Cromford Canal. There are two storeys, and each cottage has one bay. Each cottage has a doorway, and in both floors is a small-pane casement window with a segmental arch of voussoirs. There are extensions in brick at the rear. | II* |
| Riddings House; 53.07117°N 1.35899°W | | 1820 | A house and coach house, later altered and used for other purposes, the building is in sandstone and red brick, with stone dressings. The house has a roof of Welsh slate and the coach house roof is tiled. There are mainly two storeys, the original house has fronts of three bays, with an added bay to the west, a billiard room, and a tower. The house has a plinth, quoins, a floor band, and a central doorway with a fanlight. The windows are sashes with wedge lintels, grooved as voussoirs and keystones. The tower is square, in red brick with stone dressings, and has a hipped roof, on which is a glazed lantern surmounted by a square clock tower with gabled faces and a small spire. | II |
| 15, 16 and 17 Golden Valley Road; 53.05653°N 1.36753°W | | Early 19th century | A terrace of six, later three, cottages, in red brick with dentilled eaves and slate roofs. There are two storeys, and each cottage has two bays. The windows are small-pane casements, and all the openings have cambered brick heads. | II |
| 18 and 19 Golden Valley Road; 53.05662°N 1.36693°W | — | Early 19th century | A terrace of four, later two, cottages, in red brick with stepped eaves bands and slate roofs. There are two storeys, and each cottage has two bays. The windows are two-light casements, and all the openings have cambered brick heads. | II |
| 20, 21 and 22 Golden Valley Road; 53.05674°N 1.36636°W | — | Early 19th century | A terrace of six, later three, cottages, in red brick with dentilled eaves and slate roofs. There are two storeys, and each cottage has two bays. The windows are two-light casements, and all the openings have cambered brick heads. The middle cottage has a porch with a roof that has an ornamental bargeboard. | II |
| Former Newlands Inn; 53.05679°N 1.37041°W | | Early 19th century | The former public house is in red brick, partly rendered, with hipped roofs of tile and slate. There are two storeys and a T-shaped plan, with a three-bay north range, and a four-bay south range at right angles. The windows are sashes. | II |
| The Old Vicarage; 53.06892°N 1.35866°W | | Early 19th century | The former vicarage is in red brick with stucco dressings, wide bracketed eaves, and a hipped slate roof. There are two storeys, three bays, a two-bay extension to the left, and a single bay in the angle. In the centre of the main block is a doorway with Doric columns, a fanlight, a frieze, and a cornice, and the windows are sashes. Composer John Henry Mee was born here in 1852. | II |
| St James' Church, Riddings; 53.07043°N 1.36124°W | | 1830–31 | The church was designed by Francis Bedford, and the chancel was added in 1884–85 by Francis Penrose. The church is built in stone with a slate roof, and consists of a nave, a chancel, a south chapel, a north vestry, and a steeple embraced by the nave. The steeple has a slim tower with three stages, full-height buttresses rising to pinnacles with gablets, and a doorway, above which is a lancet window, string courses, a moulded cornice, an embattled parapet, and a recessed octagonal spire with friezes and a ball finial. The nave windows are paired lancets, and the east window is a stepped triple lancet. | II |
| Riddings Farmhouse; 53.07041°N 1.36057°W | | Mid 19th century | The farmhouse of a model farm, later a private house, it is in red brick on a chamfered plinth, with stone dressings, blue brick diapering, a cogged eaves band, overhanging eaves, and a slate roof. The eaves and gables have ornamental bargeboards. There are two storeys and attics, and an L-shaped plan. On the main front is a two-storey canted bay window with a hipped roof, and above it is a star-shaped window. The other windows are sashes, and on the right return is a glazed porch. | II |
| Circular water trough, Riddings Farm; 53.07057°N 1.36021°W | | Mid 19th century | The water trough in a former model farm is in cast iron, circular in plan, and about 2 feet (0.61 m) high. It is made in sections, each with a bead panel and a moulded rim, and in the centre is a circular pipe. | II |
| Octagonal building, Riddings Farm; 53.07061°N 1.36007°W | | Mid 19th century | A food store in a model farm, later converted into a house, it is in red brick with blue brick dressings, an eaves band, and a hipped slate roof. There are two storeys and an octagonal plan. In each floor are round-arched openings, on the west face are 20th-century external iron steps leading to an iron balcony, and on the north face is an original iron balcony on the upper floor with decorative iron brackets. | II |
| 13 and 14 Spring Road, Riddings; 53.06878°N 1.35651°W | | c. 1860 | A pair of matching houses in red brick, with stone and blue brick dressings, and slate roofs. Each house has two storeys and two gabled bays, and the gables between the houses contain diapering. All the gables have decorative pierced bargeboards. The windows are sashes with chamfered surrounds, cambered heads with alternating red and blue bricks, and hood moulds. At the rear are lean-to porches and segmental-headed doorways. | II |
| Stables and dovecote 53.06858°N 1.35639°W | | c. 1860 | The former stable block and dovecote are in red brick with blue brick dressings, and slate roofs that have gables with pierced and decorative bargeboards with finials and pendants. In the centre is a two-storey single bay flanked by four-bay single-storey wings. The central bay has a round-arched doorway in the ground floor and a round-arched window above. Over this the gable is broken by a raised gabled section forming the end of the dovecote. The sides of the dovecote are glazed, and it is surmounted by a square timber cupola with a pyramidal roof and a weathervane. The wings contain sash windows, small-pane windows, and segmental-arched doorways. | II |

== See also ==
- Listed buildings in Ironville
