= Listed buildings in Ironville =

Ironville is a civil parish in the Amber Valley district of Derbyshire, England. The parish contains eleven listed buildings that are recorded in the National Heritage List for England. All the listed buildings are designated at Grade II, the lowest of the three grades, which is applied to "buildings of national importance and special interest". The parish contains the model village of Ironville and the surrounding area. The Cromford Canal, now disused, runs through the parish, and the listed buildings associated with this are two bridges and three locks. The other listed buildings consist of a former vicarage, a former doctor's house and surgery, a church with a war memorial in the churchyard, and a monument and a hall in Jessop Park.

== Buildings ==
Name and location	Photograph	Date	Notes
Canal Lock at SK440 517; 53.06033°N 1.34379°W		1792	The lock is on the Cromford Canal. It is in stone, and consists of a long basin with copings.
Canal Lock at SK 443 506; 53.05883°N 1.34090°W		1792	The lock is on the Cromford Canal. It is in stone, and consists of a long basin with copings.
Canal Bridge at SK 4345 5156; 53.05993°N 1.35315°W		1793	The bridge crossing the Cromford Canal is in stone, and consists of a single stilted segmental arch. It has a band and parapets with rounded copings, and the walls curve outwards at the ends, finishing in square piers with pyramidal copings.
Canal Bridge at SK 4380 5170; 53.06063°N 1.34780°W		1793	The bridge carries Adelaide Walk Over the Cromford Canal] It is in stone, and consists of a single semicircular arch. The bridge has a band and parapets with rounded copings, and the walls curve outwards at the ends, most finishing in square piers.
Canal Lock at SK442 515; 53.05945°N 1.34192°W		c. 1793	The lock and adjacent dry dock are on the Cromford Canal. The lock is in sandstone with moulded copings and dressings. To the west is a narrow dry dock channel.
The Poplars; 53.06301°N 1.35054°W		c. 1850	A vicarage, later a private house, it is in stone, with a coved eaves band, and a tile roof with coped gables and gableted kneelers. There is a single storey with attics and three bays. In the centre is a projecting gabled porch with a four-centred arched doorway and a hood mould. The outer bays contain three-light mullioned windows, the upper windows in gabled half-dormers.
Ironville House; 53.06204°N 1.35098°W		Mid 19th century	Originally a doctor's house and surgery, it is built in slag lump from the nearby ironworks, with dressings, quoins, sill bands, the eaves cornice, and chimney stacks in red brick, and it has a slate roof. The house consists of a central double pile range with flanking cross-wings projecting at the rear. The central range and left wing have two storeys, and the right wing also has an attic. In the left wing is a porch with a decorative cornice and a flat roof containing a recessed doorway with a semicircular fanlight, and in the right wing is a smaller round-headed doorway. The windows are sashes with shallow segmental heads.
Christ Church; 53.06288°N 1.35090°W		1851–52	The church, which was altered in 1886, is in stone with a tile roof. It consists of a nave, shallow transepts, the north one forming a baptistry and the south one a porch, a chancel with a canted apse, and a west tower. The tower has three stages with chamfered bands between the stages, stepped buttresses, a two-stage polygonal stair turret, and a western doorway with a hood mould. In the middle stage are circular windows and a clock face, the bell openings have two lights and louvres, and above them is a coved string course with central and corner gargoyles, an embattled parapet, and a pyramidal roof.
Hall in Jessop Park; 53.05455°N 1.35596°W		c. 1854	The hall is in stone on a plinth, with clasping corner pilasters, dentilled eaves bands, and a slate roof with roof lights and coped pedimented gables. There is a single storey and five bays. In the north front is a large semicircular-headed doorway with pilasters, in the pediment above are five stepped windows with semicircular heads, and in the centre of the sides are similar doorways.
Jessop Monument; 53.05503°N 1.35630°W		1854–58	The memorial is to the memory of William Jessop, it is in stone, and forms a tower about 30 feet (9.1 m) high. This consists of a Tuscan column on a deep plinth, and at the top is a cast iron capital on which is a viewing platform with iron railings. On the sides of the column are small slit windows, and at the base are two blocked doorways.
War memorial 53.06271°N 1.35102°W		1923	The war memorial is in the churchyard of Christ Church. It is in granite, and consists of a Celtic-style wheel cross with a tapered shaft. This stands on a tapered rectangular plinth, and a base of two square steps. On the cross head and shaft is a sword carved in relief, on the base of the shaft is an inscription, on the plinth are the names of those lost in the two World Wars, and on the top step of the base is another inscription. The memorial is approached by a path of paving stones.

== See also ==
- Listed buildings in Ironville and Riddings Ward
