= Shallcross, Derbyshire =

Village in Derbyshire, England

Coordinates: 53.3155°N 1.9792°W

Shallcross
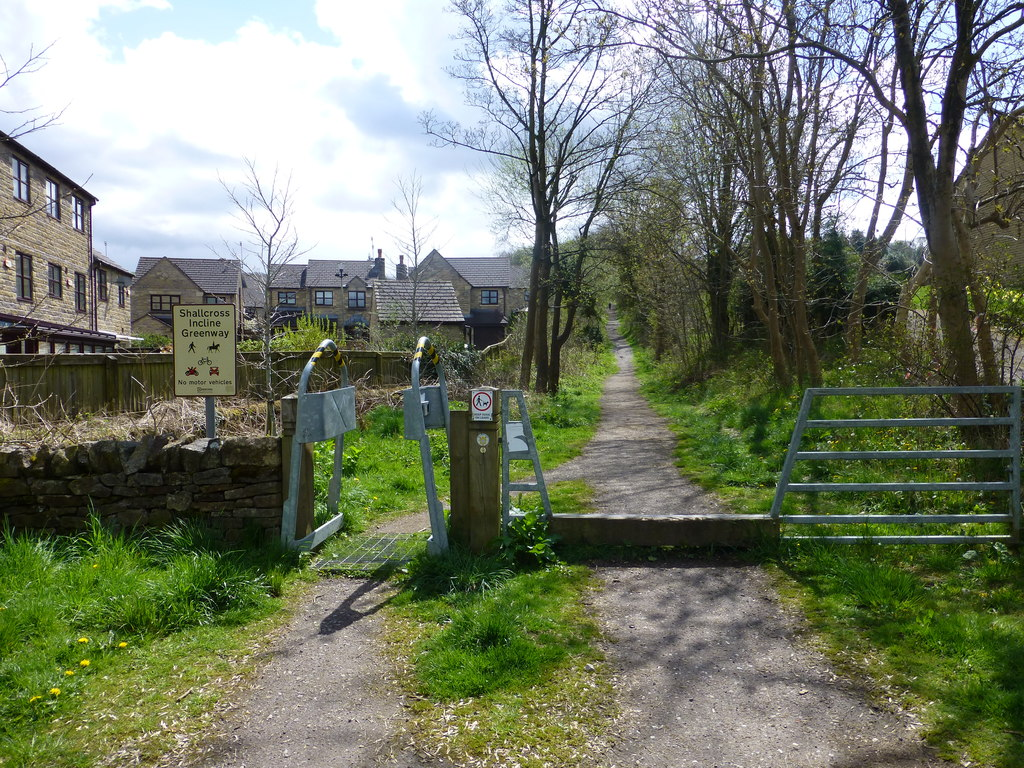

- Location within Derbyshire
- District: High Peak
- Shire county: Derbyshire
- Region: East Midlands
- Country: England
- Sovereign state: United Kingdom
- Post town: HIGH PEAK
- Postcode district: SK23
- Dialling code: 01663
- Police: Derbyshire
- Fire: Derbyshire
- Ambulance: East Midlands
- UK Parliament: High Peak

Shallcross is a small village in the High Peak borough of Derbyshire, England. It is 15 miles (24 km) south of Manchester, at the edge of the Peak District, on the eastern side of the River Goyt. Located between Whaley Bridge and Fernilee, it is now administered as part of the larger community of Whaley Bridge. The area attracts many outdoors enthusiasts, especially hikers, because of the beauty and variety of the scenery. It rises steeply as it ascends the Goyt valley from the canal terminus at Whaley Bridge, past Fernilee Reservoir, and onto the highlands of Axe Edge Moor.

== History ==
There is evidence of ancient settlement in the area, and ancient barrows and stones are found on nearby Ladder Hill. The region was settled by Danes who moved to the area from the Danish lands north of the River Mersey. The village of Shallcross is not mentioned in the Domesday Book, but it was known before 1108, as it mentioned in the charter bestowed on the Lenton Priory by William Peverel before that date:

"Two parts of the tithes of his demesne pastures in the Peak, namely in Shalcross, Fernilee, Darnall, Quatford, Buxton, Shirebrook, Stanton, Cowdale, Crochil Callow, Dunningestede, Chelmorton, and Sterndale, also the whole tithe of colts and fillies, wherever there was a stud-farm in his Peak demesnes, together with the tithes of his lead and of his venison both in skins and meat, all in Derbyshire."

From 1108 onwards, the name occurs in various phonetic variations, both as a village and as a family name, as in Shallcross, Shalcrosse, Shawcross, de Shakelcrosse, and similar on land deeds and church records.

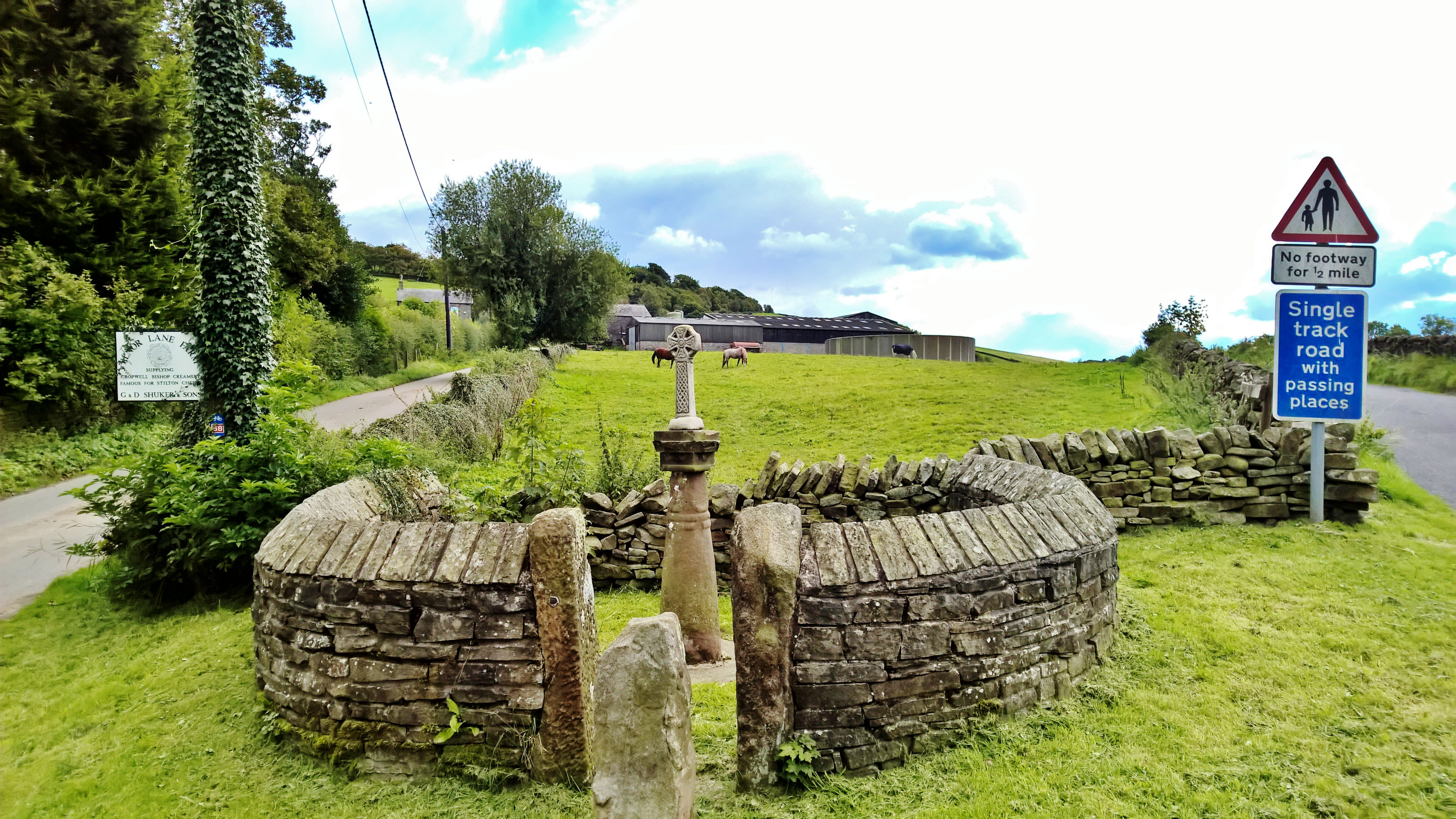
The Shall Cross

The name Shallcross itself comes from an ancient stone cross, known as the Shall Cross, only the shaft of which is still standing. This cross is traditionally dated to the year 832, when St. Paulinus visited the area, although the existing stone shaft may have been erected at a later date. The name comes from the Old Norse shakal, denoting a tapering pole, which describes the shape of the shaft. For a time it was removed and used as the pedestal for a sundial in the garden of one of the local homes, but it was discovered and has been restored to its original location.

Shallcross was once a stop on the Cromford and High Peak Railway line, which crossed the hills to connect the Peak Forest Canal terminal at Whaley Bridge with the Cromford Canal 30 miles to the south. The Shallcross Incline was a notable feature of this line, as the rail cars had to be pulled up the steep incline by a steam engine at the top of the hill. Opened in 1831, the northern end of the railway, including the Shallcross station, was abandoned in 1892, although a short section of the line serving a goods yard, identified on Ordnance Survey maps as Shallcross Yard, remained in use until 1965.

== Landmarks ==
Other notable features in the village included the Shallcross Colliery, a mill, and a large gunpowder factory, all of which are now closed. Shallcross Hall was the ancestral home of the Shallcross family, but it was damaged by fire and torn down in 1968.

== Literary references ==
The Shallcross family is featured in the novel A World of Profit (1968) by Louis Auchincloss.
