= Harpur Hill railway station =

Former railway station in Derbyshire, England

Harpur Hill railway station was a minor stop on the Cromford and High Peak Railway, near to the village of Harpur Hill in Derbyshire, England.

== History ==
The station opened to passengers in 1855. The line was used mostly for mineral and quarry traffic. It closed in 1876, due to low usage. It continued to be used for goods, but closed eventually in 1967 along with the rest of the line.

Preceding station	Disused railways	Following station
Hindlow	Cromford and High Peak Railway	Ladmanlow

== The site today ==
Nothing remains of the station buildings. The trackbed is still traceable but unkept.
