= St James' Church, Riddings =

St James’ Church, Riddings
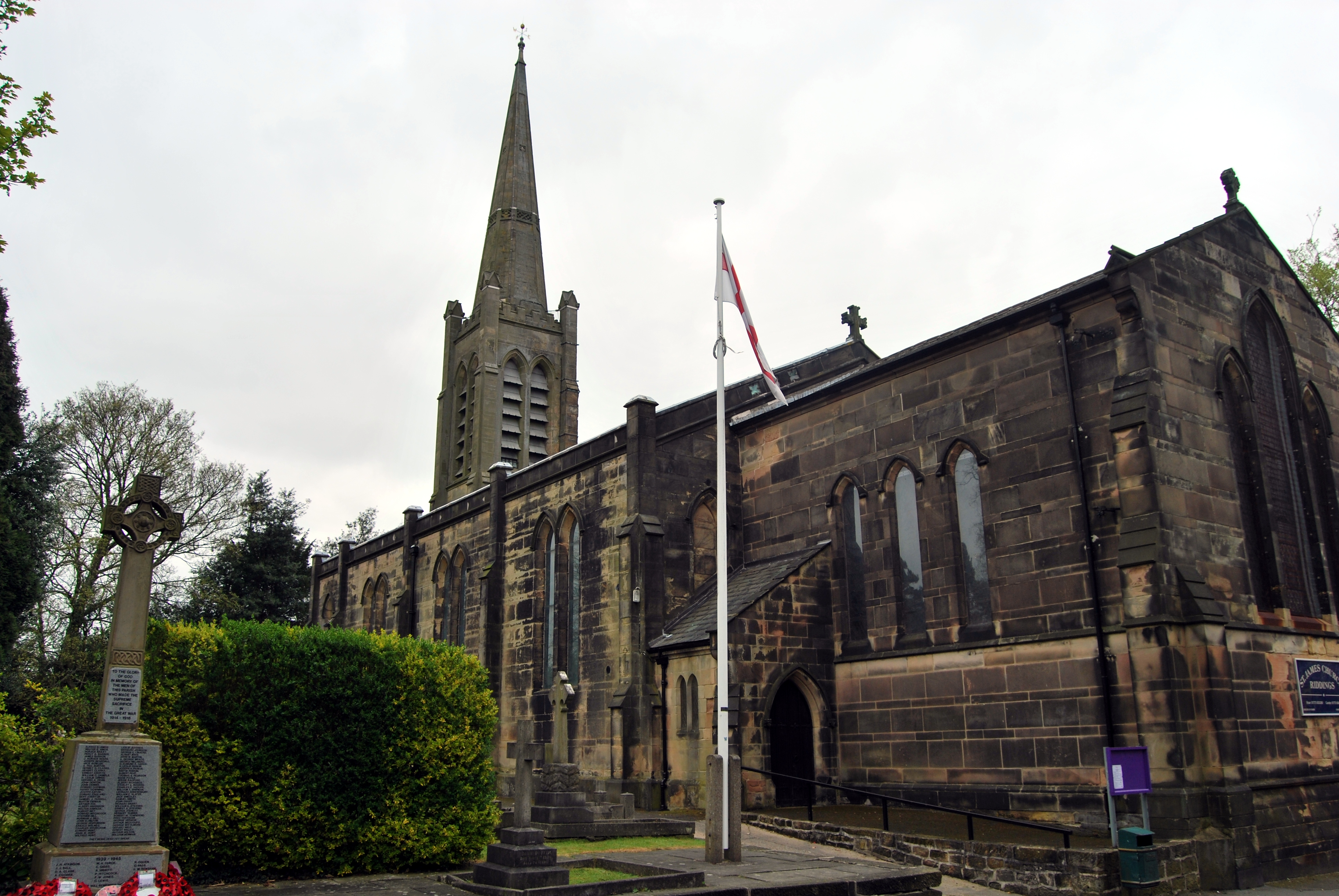
- St James’ Church, Riddings
- St James’ Church, Riddings
- 53°04′11.39″N 1°21′45.65″W
- OS grid reference: SK 42898 52764
- Location: Riddings, Derbyshire
- Country: England
- Denomination: Church of England

History
- Dedication: St James
- Consecrated: 28 June 1834

Architecture
- Heritage designation: Grade II listed
- Architect: Francis Octavius Bedford
- Groundbreaking: 1832
- Completed: 1833

Administration
- Province: Canterbury
- Diocese: Derby
- Archdeaconry: Derby
- Deanery: Alfreton
- Parish: Riddings

St James’ Church, Riddings is a Grade II listed parish church in the Church of England in Riddings, Derbyshire.

== History ==
The church was built in 1832 - 1833 by Francis Octavius Bedford, for the Oakes family of Riddings House. Many of the locals were dissenters and would not pay the amount of £200 required by the Bishop of Lichfield and Coventry for his blessing, so its consecration was delayed until 28 June 1834.

The church was restored and enlarged between 1884 and 1885 when the chancel was added. The old pews were taken away and the side galleries taken down. A reredos was given by Mr. R.G. Lomas of Derby. The church was re-opened by the Bishop of Southwell on 8 April 1885.

== Parish status ==
The church is in a joint parish with

- Christ Church, Ironville

== Organ ==
A pipe organ was built by Bevington ca. 1850. It was enlarged in 1885 by Charles Lloyd. A specification of the organ can be found on the National Pipe Organ Register.
