= Ladmanlow railway station =

Railway station in Derbyshire, England

Ladmanlow railway station was a minor railway station located on the Cromford and High Peak Railway near Buxton in Derbyshire. It was located on a line mostly used for mineral and quarry traffic. It opened to passengers in 1855 and closed in 1876 due to relatively but not uncommonly low usage. The goods station then closed in 1967 along with the rest of the line. Today, nothing remains of the station. It was also the terminus of the line originally for passengers until 1874 when it was extended to Buxton/Whaley Bridge. The trackbed now forms an access route to the Health and Safety Executive Science & Research Centre from the A53. Remains of the route towards Whaley bridge can be seen on the nearby A54 where a bridge abutment and an embankment are visible.

== Route ==
Preceding station	Disused railways	Following station
Harpur Hill	Whaley Bridge Branch	Bunsail
Harpur Hill	Buxton Branch	Buxton
