= John Henry Mee =

English academic, clergyman, writer and composer

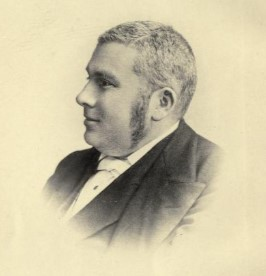
John Henry Mee: frontispiece to Ten Years of University Music in Oxford (1894)

John Henry Mee (16 August 1852 – 15 January 1918) was an Oxford academic, clergyman, composer and author on musical subjects.

== Life and career ==
Mee was born at Riddings Vicarage in Derbyshire, the son of vicar John Mee, and studied at Queen's College, Oxford from 1871, where he gained his B.A in 1875. He became a Fellow, Merton College in 1875, completing his M.A in 1878 and a B.Mus. in 1882, and was appointed succentor (1876-81) and lecturer (1877-82).

He was ordained by John Mackarness, Bishop of Oxford, in 1877. He married Alice Ann Marten at Holy Trinity Church, Ventnor on 26 April 1878. At Worcester College he was appointed lecturer of ancient history in 1882.

Mee was an active participant in Oxford chamber music. He gave lectures at the Musical Association, and, along with Francis Cunningham Woods, founded and led the Oxford University Musical Union from 1884. From 1884 until 1898 he was the tenant of Kettell Hall on Broad Street - the stone house then attached to the western side of Blackwell's Local Bookshop, now part of Trinity College. Under John Stainer he was Coryphaeus Precentor of Music, University of Oxford from 1890 until 1899.

In 1899 he was appointed Precentor of Chichester Cathedral and from then on he divided his time between Holywell House, Mansfield Road, Oxford and The Chantry, Foxbury Lane, Westbourne in Sussex. He died aged 65 at his Oxford home after a period of declining health. He left £39,944 in his will. His wife died 20 years before him. There was one daughter.

== Musical activities ==
Mee devoted much of his time to music. According to his obituarist: "having ample means, he was able to indulge in his tastes". He completed his B.Mus degree in 1882 and then continued his musical studies for a D.Mus., awarded in 1888. It was a costly requirement then that exercises submitted for the D.Mus. should be publicly performed. For his submitted exercise - an elaborate Missa solemnis in Bb for soloists, double chorus and orchestra - Mee outdid the previous excesses of his predecessor Frederick Ouseley. He hired a team of the most eminent solo vocalists in the whole country, a complete orchestra and "Mr Alfred Broughton's Leeds Choir of 160 voices". The performance took place at the Sheldonian Theatre on 9 November 1888. Soon afterward, the requirement for the public performance of exercises was abolished.

As a composer Mee wrote several other large scale choral works, including Dies Ascensionis for soloists, chorus and orchestra, and two ballads for men's chorus and orchestra: Horatio (1891) and Delphi (1895, words E A Freeman). There were also anthems (such as the Christmas anthem God who at sundry times, 1889), carols, madrigals and organ music. The Bodleian Library in Oxford has a set of parts (with autograph corrections) for Mee's String Quartet in G major, composed circa 1885-1890 and published in 1890.

== Author ==
He was one of the authors of Ten Years of University Music in Oxford. 1884-1894 (1894 - a record of the proceedings of the Oxford Musical Union), and a contributor to Grove's Dictionary of Music. He also wrote The Oldest Music Room in Europe (1911), a historical account of the Holywell Music Room in Oxford, and (with some assistance from Louis Francis Salzman) Bourne in the Past: Being a history of the Parish of Westbourne (1913).

=== Works ===
- P.C. Buck, J.H. Mee & F.C. Woods: Ten Years of University Music in Oxford: Being a Brief Record of the Proceedings of the Oxford University Musical Union During the Year 1884-1894 (1894)
- E.S. Kemp and J.S. Mee: Ten More Years of University Music in Oxford (1904)
- The Oldest Music Room in Europe (1911)
- Bourne in the Past: Being a history of the Parish of Westbourne (1913)
