= John Mee (priest) =

John Mee (3 May 1824 in Nottingham – 19 September 1883 in Fort William) was the inaugural Dean of Grahamstown in South Africa. (Note: "... John Mee, the first Dean, who only held office for a short time, was in his turn succeeded by a far more notable man.")

He was educated at Christ's College, Cambridge and ordained in 1849. His first post was a curacy at All Saints, Derby. He was the incumbent at Riddings from 1850 to 1854 when he went with the CMS to South Africa. On his return to England he was at St Jude, Southwark from 1864 to 1871; and after that St John the Baptist's Church, Westbourne from then until his death.

He was married twice; first to Eleanor Flower of Derby; their son was the Oxford clergyman, composer and author on musical subjects John Henry Mee. He married his second wife, Ellen Mary Marten, on 26 April 1866 at St. Thomas', Upper Clapton.

== Notes ==
Footnotes

Citations
