= Francis Cunningham Woods =

English composer and conductor (1862–1929)

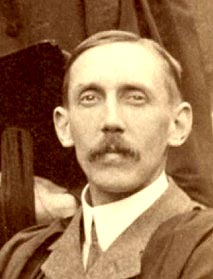
- Woods when a music master at Highgate School
- Born: 29 August 1862; London, England
- Died: 21 September 1929 (aged 67); Chartham, Kent
- Occupations: Composer, schoolteacher

Francis Cunningham Woods (29 August 1862–21 September 1929) was an Oxford academic, composer, author, organist, and choral conductor. Together with the composer John Stainer, he was the author of the series The Village Organist (first published in 1897), which contained scores for organ.

== Biography ==
Francis Cunningham Woods studied at Oxford University, where he obtained a B.A. in 1889, an M.A. in 1890, and a Mus.B. in 1891. He was a Fellow of the Royal College of Organists. He studied at the National Training School, Kensington, London, from 1877–1880, where he studied under Arthur Sullivan and Ebenezer Prout, and won the Lord Frederic Fitzroy Scholarship for organ playing. He was organist of Brasenose College, Oxford, from 1884 to 1886; organ scholar of Exeter College, Oxford, (1887–1895). Along with John Henry Mee, he was a founder member of the Oxford University Musical Union.

Woods was organist to the Duke of Marlborough from 1891–1894, and taught at Highgate School from 1896. He conducted the Finsbury Choral Association, 1897–1901.

Woods was a music teacher and composer of orchestral music, anthems, services, and songs. He was born in the parish of St. Pancras, London on 29 August 1862. He had a brother, William Maitland Woods, who also studied at Oxford, and who emigrated to Australia, where he was rector of Thursday Island, Queensland. According to the East Suffolk Gazette, in 1887 the 24-year old Woods (at that time the organist of Exeter College), along with his brother William, "Miss Grace E. Woods", and "Miss Delia Woods"—"the talented family of Ingate Lodge"—participated together in a charity concert in the Suffolk town of Beccles.

Woods died in hospital at Chartham, Kent on 21 September 1929, and left £4082 in his will to Charlotte, his widow.

== Selected works ==
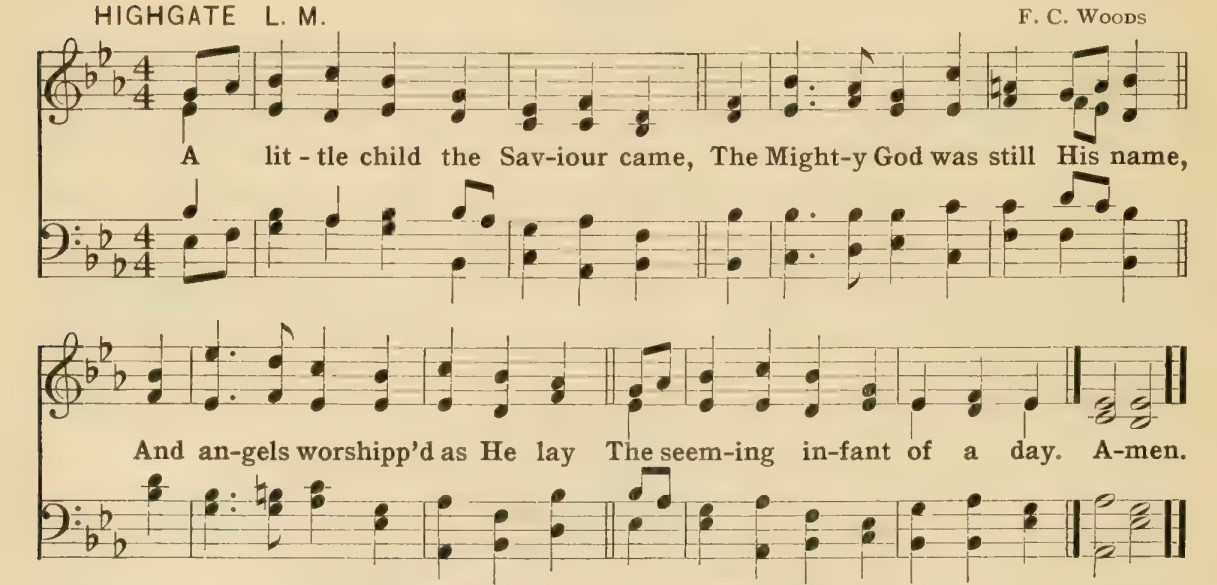
Francis Cunningham Woods' "Highgate" hymn tune

External videos
- "Variations on St George"

- Grand March for organ.
- Variations on Elvey’s Tune “St. George”.
- Hymn tune "Highgate".
- Public school songs "Play Hard for the School"; "A Fives Song".
- Arrangements of George Elvey's Festal March and a march by Handel.
- Minuet and trio for orchestra.
- Gressenhall Suite for strings and piano (1915).
- King Harold (cantata, Crystal Palace, 6 June 1896).
- A Greyport Legend for men's chorus, with solo bass, and orchestra.
- Lie down, poor heart (madrigal).
- Carmen Exoniense (Exeter College song).
- Six songs, op. 1.
- Incidental music to Two Gentlemen of Verona (Oxford, 1893).
- Incidental music to The Tempest (Oxford, January 1894).
- Suite in F major.
- Suite in D for string orchestra in C minor.
- Romance in F for violin and orchestra.
- Romance in G for violin, organ, and piano.
- Music for church services.

== Sources ==
- Brown, James D.; Stratton, Stephen S. (1897). British Musical Biography (PDF). Birmingham, UK: S.S. Stratton.
- Buck, P.C.; Mee, J.H.; Woods, Francis Cunningham (1894). Ten Years of University Music in Oxford. Oxford, UK: Bowden.
- Foster, Joseph (1893). Oxford Men, 1880-1892, with a Record of Their Schools, Honours and Degrees. Oxford; London: Parker.
