= Walter Tinsley =

English footballer

Personal information
- Full name: Walter Tinsley
- Date of birth: 10 August 1891
- Place of birth: Ironville, England
- Date of death: 7 March 1966 (aged 74)
- Place of death: Ripley, Derbyshire, England
- Height: 5 ft 9 in (1.75 m)
- Position: Inside forward

Senior career*
Years	Team	Apps	(Gls)
1910–1911	Alfreton Town		
1911	Sutton Town		
1911–1914	Sunderland	10	(3)
1914–1921	Middlesbrough	86	(46)
1921–1924	Nottingham Forest	61	(13)
1924–1927	Reading	55	(13)
- * Club domestic league appearances and goals

Walter Edward Tinsley (10 August 1891 – 7 March 1966) was an English professional footballer who played as an inside forward for Sunderland.
