= Leawood Pump House =

Pumping station in Cromford, Derbyshire, England

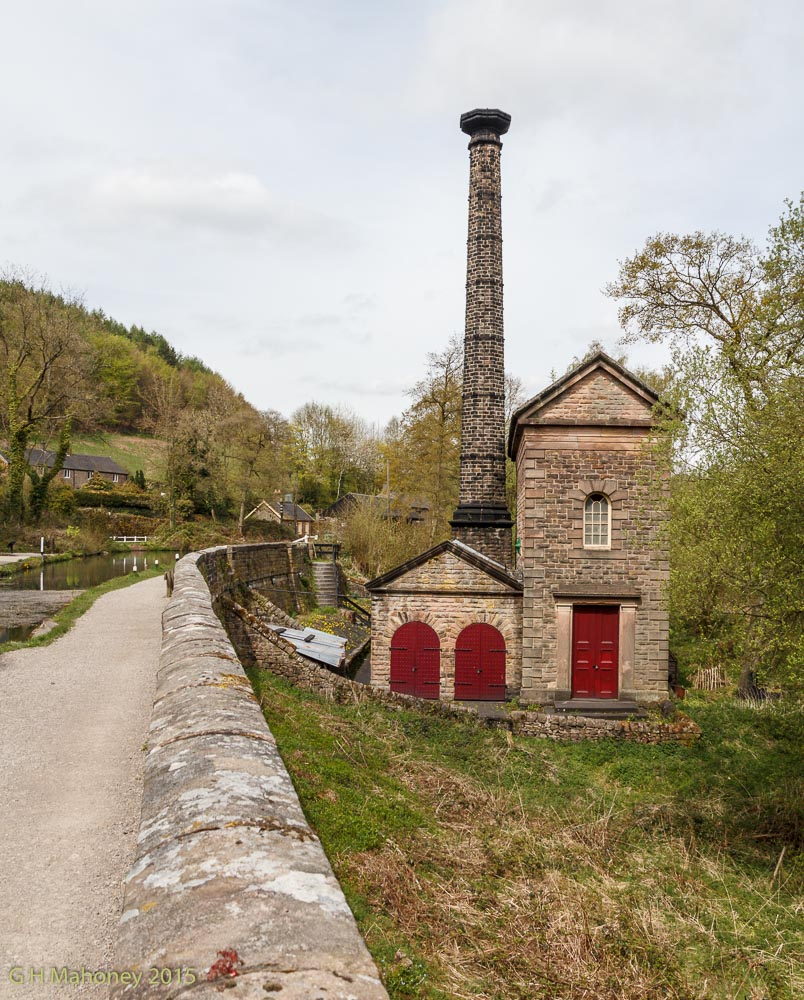

- Location within Derbyshire

General information
- Location: Cromford, England
- Coordinates: 53°05′51″N 1°31′51″W
- Ordnance Survey: SK3152855682
- Year built: 1849

Design and construction
- Designations: Grade II

The Leawood Pump House (also known as High Peak Pump House) was built near Cromford, Derbyshire, England in 1849 to supply water to the Cromford Canal, built some 50 years previously. It is a Grade II* listed building.

Located a little along the canal towpath from High Peak Junction, it stands to a height of 45 feet (14 m) on the right bank of the River Derwent, at the end of the Derwent Aqueduct, and has a 95-foot (29 m) chimney stack with a cast-iron cap.

The Watt-type beam engine was designed and erected by Graham and Company of Milton Works, Elsecar, Sheffield. The beam length is 33 feet (10 m), the piston diameter 50 inches (1.3 m), stroke of 10 feet (3.0 m) and the engine works at 7 strokes per minute. The boilers, replaced in 1900, have a pressure of 40 p.s.i.

Water is drawn from the River Derwent through a 150-yard (140 m) tunnel to a reservoir in the basement. It is then lifted 30 feet (9.1 m) and discharged into the canal.

The immense size of the pump (which can transfer almost four tons of water per stroke and seven strokes a minute, a total of over 39,000 tons of water per 24 hours) is explained by the fact that there were restrictions on removing water from the Derwent river, this being allowed only between 8 p.m. on Saturdays and 8 p.m. on Sundays.

The pumphouse worked continuously from 1849 until 1944 when the canal closed. It was restored in 1979 by the Cromford Canal Society and is run periodically.
