= Christ Church, Ironville =

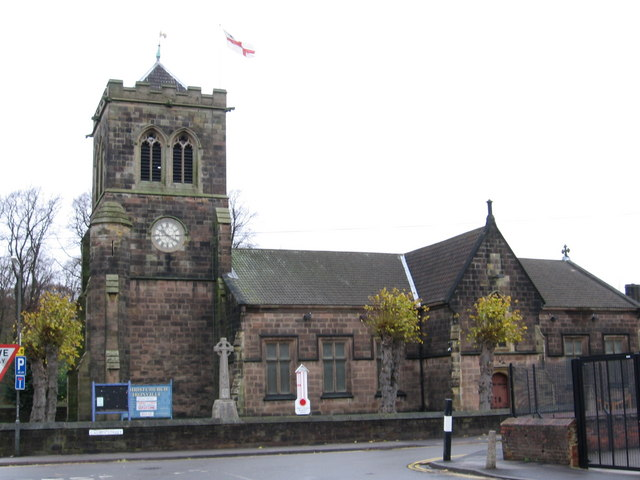
- Christ Church, Ironville
- Christ Church, Ironville
- 53°03′45.91″N 1°21′3.05″W
- OS grid reference: SK 43598 51930
- Location: Ironville, Derbyshire
- Country: England
- Denomination: Church of England

History
- Dedication: Christ Church
- Consecrated: 16 April 1852

Architecture
- Heritage designation: Grade II listed
- Architect: Henry Isaac Stevens
- Groundbreaking: 1851
- Completed: 1852

Administration
- Province: Canterbury
- Diocese: Derby
- Archdeaconry: Derby
- Deanery: Alfreton
- Parish: Ironville

Christ Church, Ironville is a Grade II listed parish church in the Church of England in Ironville, Derbyshire.

== History ==
The church was built between 1851 and 1852 to the designs of Henry Isaac Stevens for the Butterley Iron Company. It was consecrated on 16 April 1852, by the Bishop of Lichfield.

== Parish status ==
The church is in a joint parish with

- St James' Church, Riddings

== Organ ==
A pipe organ was built by Thomas Christopher Lewis in 1876. A specification of the organ can be found on the National Pipe Organ Register.
