= Riddings =

Village in Derbyshire, England

Coordinates: 53.067°N 1.368°W

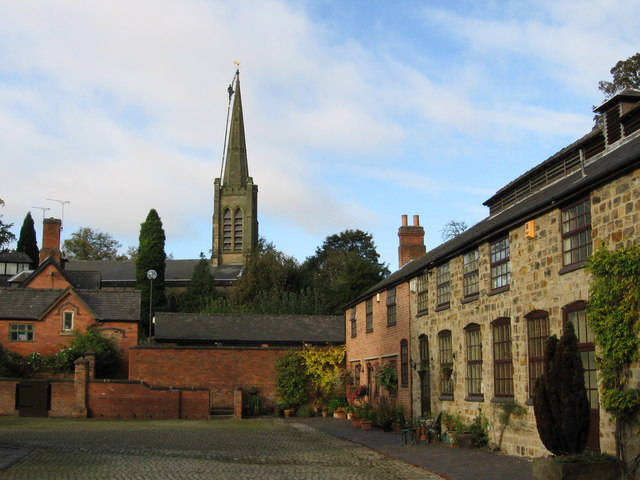
- Church Mews and Spire, Riddings.

- Location within Derbyshire
- Population: 6,307 (Ward. Ironville and Riddings. 2021)
- OS grid reference: SK424523
- District: Amber Valley
- Shire county: Derbyshire
- Region: East Midlands
- Country: England
- Sovereign state: United Kingdom
- Post town: ALFRETON
- Postcode district: DE55
- Dialling code: 01773
- Police: Derbyshire
- Fire: Derbyshire
- Ambulance: East Midlands

Riddings is a large village in Derbyshire, England. The appropriate ward of the Amber Valley Council is called Ironville and Riddings. The population of this ward as at the 2011 census was 5,821. It is located 2 miles (3 km) south of Alfreton near the hamlet of Golden Valley. The name derives from Ryddynges, a clearing or riding in a wood. This was the ancient forest known as Alfreton Grove within the manor of Alfreton. The settlement goes back at least to the 12th century, when Hugh de Ryddynges received half of the manor of Riddings and half of Watnall from his relative Ralf Ingram of Alfreton.

== Industrial development ==
The surrounding area had traditional industries of coal and ironstone mining, which remained small in scale until the opening of a branch from the Cromford Canal in 1793 gave impetus to the construction of iron furnaces. In 1800 Derby ironfounders Thomas Saxelby, James Oakes and Forrester opened the Riddings Iron Works. By 1806 Thos. Saxelby & Co. had become the largest producers of pig iron in Derbyshire.

Oakes became sole owner of the Iron Works in 1818 with the purchase of Forrester's shares (Saxelbye having sold up in 1808). Throughout the nineteenth century Oakes and his family expanded their industrial holdings to include several local collieries. In 1888 they established the Riddings and District Gas Company in partnership with the Butterley Company. By-products of gas production were used to produce tar, sulphuric acid and other chemicals; local supplies of clay were fired to make bricks and pipes.

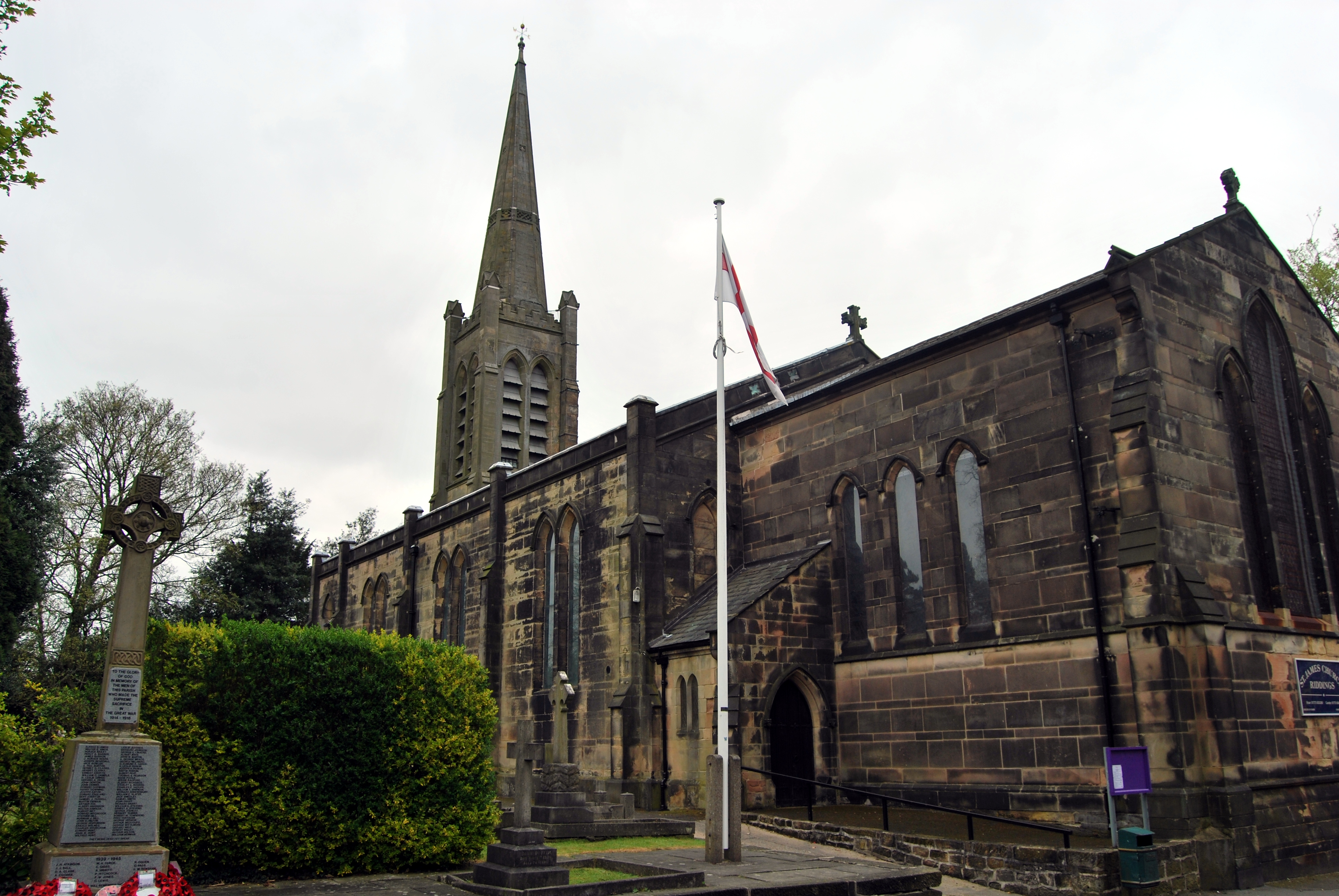
St James' Church, Riddings

The Oakes family contributed extensively to the fabric of the village. In addition to their family home of Riddings House these contributions included a substantial part of the parish church of St James (1833) and the National School of 1845. The church has a north – south alignment. Riddings House is now (2008) a residential home for the elderly, the surrounding park is now public, and the associated Model Farm has been converted to housing.

The German chemist Robert Bunsen, who gave his name to the Bunsen burner in scientific experiments, was brought to Riddings in 1844 by Scottish scientist Professor Lyon Playfair to examine the behaviour of the coke fired blast furnaces. The buildings in which he worked still stand today on the former ironworks site.

The heavy industries have now gone but employment is now provided on a modern estate by lighter industries.

There is one family business in Riddings that has spanned 8 generations and is still trading after more than 200 years. This is the Luke Evans Bakery, founded by Henry Evans in 1804 on a site on Green Hill Lane. The business still trades from premises on Green Hill Lane in 2015. At various times, the business has diversified into other, non-food, areas but currently concentrates on wholesale baking, delivering to about 300 food retail businesses in Derbyshire, Nottinghamshire and some neighbouring counties. It employs about 50 staff.

== Shopping and housing ==
Riddings has adequate shopping facilities and modern housing developments have extended on all sides of the village. The Guinness Trust has modernised the old village cottages and built new ones in keeping with their original character.

== Public houses ==
The village has six public houses: the Red Lion, the Greenhill, the Queens Head, the Newlands Inn (destroyed by fire in 2011), the Moulders Arms and the Seven Stars. The latter was built in 1702 on the site of a chapel of ease dedicated to St Mary Magdalen.

== Windmills ==
James Oakes also built two tower windmills, named James and Sarah (after his wife Sarah Haddon). These were built in a yard (grid reference SK424531) on Greenhill Lane in 1870 or 1877, possibly on the site of a post mill advertised for sale in 1829. James was a brick tower 67 feet (20 m) high of 7 storeys, 36 feet 6 inches (11.13 m) diameter at the base, driven by six double-bladed patent sails and with eight-bladed fantails. Sarah appears to have had only 6 storeys. There were 2 open galleries on both mills, above the second floor and below the cap. The windshafts were of iron, 13 inches (33 cm) diameter. Other internal equipment has not been recorded.

Because the mills were close together one of the towers would 'rob the wind' (or obstruct the airflow to the sails) of the other. Consequentially before 1890 the Sarah mill had its sails removed and the milling machinery powered by a vertical-boilered stationary steam engine. It is possible that Sarah never had the sails fitted. The mills were used for grinding grain from the Oakes' estates, both for flour and for animal feed. In 1918 the sails of the James mill were removed and the steam plant replaced by a 24 horsepower (18 kW) oil engine which powered both mills. The mills stopped work c. 1927.

The floors of James were removed some time after 1927 and the mill used by the Granwood company, manufacturers of composition block flooring, to store sawdust.

Ownership of the mills passed to the National Coal Board in 1947. In 1948 the N.C.B. sold the mills and some surrounding land to Deosan Ltd., who had a nearby chemical factory. Both mills were used by Deosan as storage space. In the winter of 1949 Deosan contracted an Alfreton scrap dealer to remove most of the metal from the mills, including the windshafts, in preparation for the installation of working plant. From Sarah 30 long tons (30 t) of scrap were removed; from James (after erecting scaffolding inside the tower) 7 long tons (7 t). The floors of James were re-instated and it was used for storage; Sarah had chemical plant installed.

In 1959 the Diversey Corporation of Chicago bought Deosan, and the mills passed into the ownership of its subsidiary Diversey (UK) Ltd. In the early morning of Tuesday 29 January 1963 a fire started in Sarah, gutting the mill and destroying nearby storage sheds. Both mills were demolished soon afterwards. The land has since become a housing estate.

== Notable people ==
- Frederick Thomas Brentnall

== See also ==
- Listed buildings in Ironville and Riddings Ward
