= Cromford Canal =

Canal in Derbyshire, England

Coordinates: 53.063952°N 1.482618°W

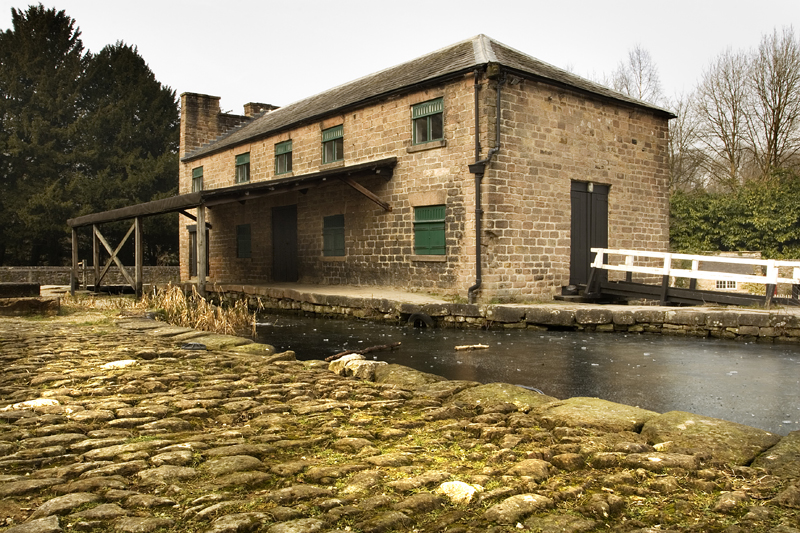
- The end of the canal, in Cromford
- Interactive map of Cromford Canal

Specifications
- Locks: 14
- Status: Part navigable, part derelict
- Navigation authority: Derbyshire County Council

History
- Original owner: Cromford Canal Company
- Principal engineer: Benjamin Outram
- Date of act: 1789
- Date completed: 1794

Geography
- Start point: Cromford
- End point: Langley Mill
- Branch: Pinxton
- Connects to: Erewash Canal, Nottingham Canal

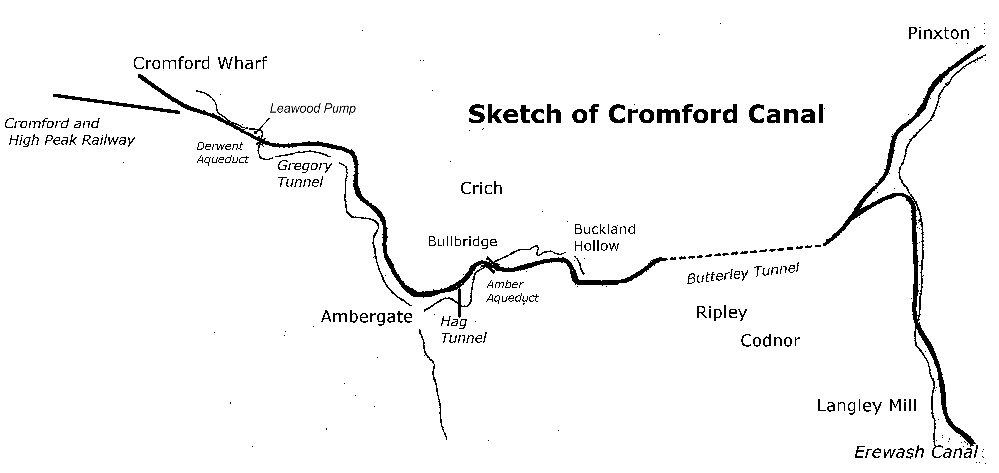
Sketch of the canal

The Cromford Canal ran 14 1/2 miles (23.3 kilometres) from Cromford to the Erewash Canal in Derbyshire, England with a branch to Pinxton. Built by William Jessop with the assistance of Benjamin Outram, its alignment included four tunnels and 14 locks.

From Cromford it ran south following the 275-foot (84 m) contour line along the east side of the valley of the Derwent to Ambergate, where it turned eastwards along the Amber valley. It turned sharply to cross the valley, crossing the river and the Ambergate to Nottingham road, by means of an aqueduct at Bullbridge, before turning towards Ripley. From there the Butterley Tunnel took it through to the Erewash Valley.

From the tunnel it continued to Ironville, the junction for the branch to Pinxton, and then descended through fourteen locks to meet the Erewash Canal at Langley Mill. The Pinxton Branch became important as a route for Nottinghamshire coal, via the Erewash, to the River Trent and Leicester and was a terminus of the Mansfield and Pinxton Railway.

A 6-mile (9.7 km) long section of the Cromford canal between Cromford and Ambergate is listed as a Biological Site of Special Scientific Interest (SSSI) and a local nature reserve.

In addition to purely canal traffic, there was a lively freight interchange with the Cromford and High Peak Railway, which traversed the plateau of the Peak District from Whaley Bridge in the north west, and which descended to the canal at High Peak Junction by means of an inclined plane.

== Origins ==
The Erewash Canal had been opened from the River Trent to Langley Mill in 1779, but initially there was a lack of traffic. The proprietors appealed for anyone who owned land near the canal which contained coal deposits to open pits. As the pits opened, profits soared, and by 1789 dividends had reached 20 per cent. On 1 May 1787, the proprietors considered two letters at their meeting, which proposed extensions beyond Langley Mill. The proposals were from local landowners, and were seen as an extension of the Erewash Canal. One was for a canal from Langley Mill to Pinxton, where there were 6 miles (9.7 km) of coal-bearing land, but the promotors could not reach agreement with the proprietors of the Erewash Canal.

The suggestion was declined by the canal company, so local businessmen, including Benjamin Outram's father Joseph, Benjamin decided to go ahead on their own, asking William Jessop to design one between Langley Mill and Cromford, with a branch to Pinxton. This would carry coal to Cromford, which was becoming industrialised, and limestone from the area for the growing iron industry. Also important would be lead from Wirksworth and cotton from the Cromford Mills. The connection to the Erewash Canal would provide an outlet to the Trent and Mersey Canal and the rest of the country.

The canal therefore attracted the support of some powerful figures such as Philip Gell of Hopton Hall and Sir Richard Arkwright – the latter initially at least. Matters were taken out of the Erewash Canal owners hands, for, without their co-operation, there was the implicit threat that a competing canal would be built to the Trent. The major opposition came from the water-powered mill owners along the Derwent, of which there were many, downstream of the proposed canal, fearful of loss of flow in dry weather. Since, between Cromford and Pinxton, the canal would be level, Jessop was able to give reassurance, carefully downplaying the problem of the descent, with its locks, to Langley Mill.

However, with the assistance of Benjamin Outram, he also spent over a year measuring the flow rate of the Derwent, a precaution which was invaluable when the bill was placed before Parliament. He also proposed to make the summit pound deep enough that it could be replenished on Sundays when the mills were closed, and hold enough water to supply the locks for a week even in the driest weather.

The length from the Erewash Canal would be built to match, accessible to barges from the Trent. Through the Butterley Tunnel and along the narrow Derwent valley it would be to narrow boat standards, similar to the Trent and Mersey.

At the last minute before the bill was to be presented to Parliament, Richard Arkwright raised a problem. The assumption had been that water would come from Cromford Sough, the drainage from the Wirksworth lead mines. Arkwright complained that the canal crossed his land and insisted that water should be obtained from the river by raising the height of the weir at Masson Mill. This was an unwelcome complication (which would mainly benefit Arkwright himself and his mill) but the canal committee reluctantly agreed.

== Construction ==
Cromford Canal Act 1789
- Act of Parliament
- Parliament of Great Britain
- Long title: An Act for making and maintaining a Navigable Canal from, or from near to Cromford Bridge, in the County of Derby, to join and communicate with Erewash Canal, at or near Langley Bridge, and also a Collateral Cut from the said intended Canal at or near Codnor Park Mill to or near Pinxton Mill, in the said County.
- Citation: 29 Geo. 3. c. 74
- Territorial extent: Great Britain

Dates
- Royal assent: 31 July 1789
- Commencement: 20 November 1788 (Note: Start of session.)
Other legislation
Amended by	Cromford Canal Act 1790; Cromford Canal Act 1845
Relates to	North Midland Railway Act 1836

Status: Amended

Text of statute as originally enacted

The canal obtained its act of Parliament, the Cromford Canal Act 1789 (29 Geo. 3. c. 74). Perhaps because they had quoted too little, basing their estimates on Jessop's cost predictions which may themselves have been too optimistic, the contractors soon found themselves in financial difficulties and, at the end of 1790, simply walked off the site. Benjamin Outram hastily took over full management control and was awarded a salary increase. In January 1792 there was a problem when the Amber Aqueduct failed but, by May, the canal to the east of Butterley was virtually complete and most of the earthworks to the west.

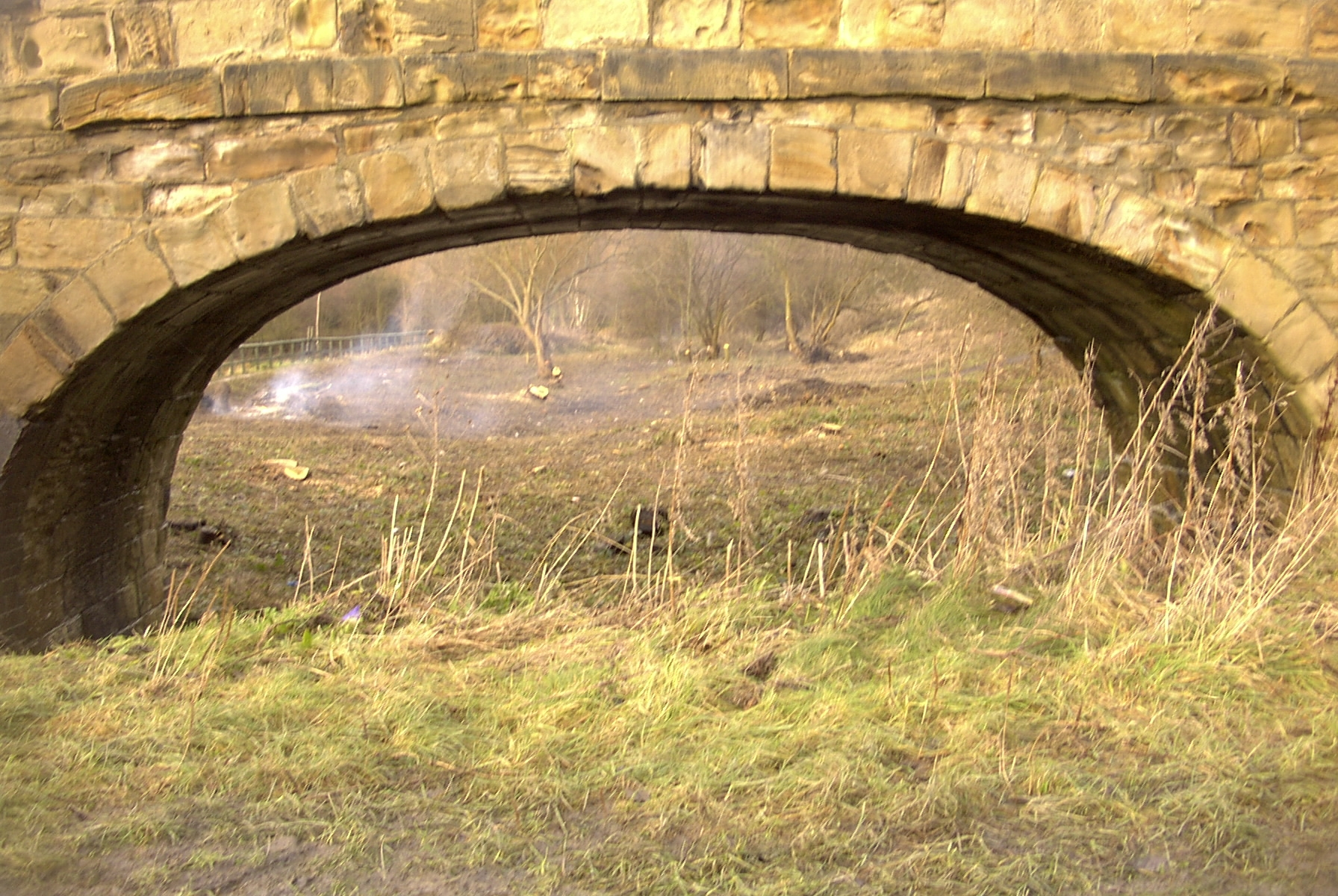
The Pinxton arm viewed from where it joins the main canal

The Butterley Tunnel was excavated by first sinking 33 shafts, about 75 yards (69 m) apart as much as 57 yards (52 m) deep to give a number of working faces. Most of the heading was through soil, with some coal measures and iron ore deposits, the final tunnel being lined through most of its length.

By 1793 the company had a balance in hand of only £273 and the cost had risen to half as much again as Jessop's original estimate. Nevertheless, the canal was showing an income, unfinished though it was.

In August, however, there were problems with the Derwent Aqueduct which required considerable modification. The spandrel walls had parted due to the horizontal forces imposed by the canal, and a longitudinal split had opened up in the arch. In his report to the canal committee, Jessop gave his opinion that the use of Crich lime, being unusually pure, had delayed the setting of the mortar. Later writers, with the benefit of engineering knowledge acquired after Jessop's time, have suggested that the spandrel walls were simply too slender for the forces imposed. At any rate, the arch was partly dismantled and steel tie bars and lateral reinforcing arches were installed, together with external buttresses. This Jessop did at his own expense.

In the end, despite costing about twice the initial estimate of £42,697 (£4,910,000 in 2025), the canal opened in 1794 and was a financial success.

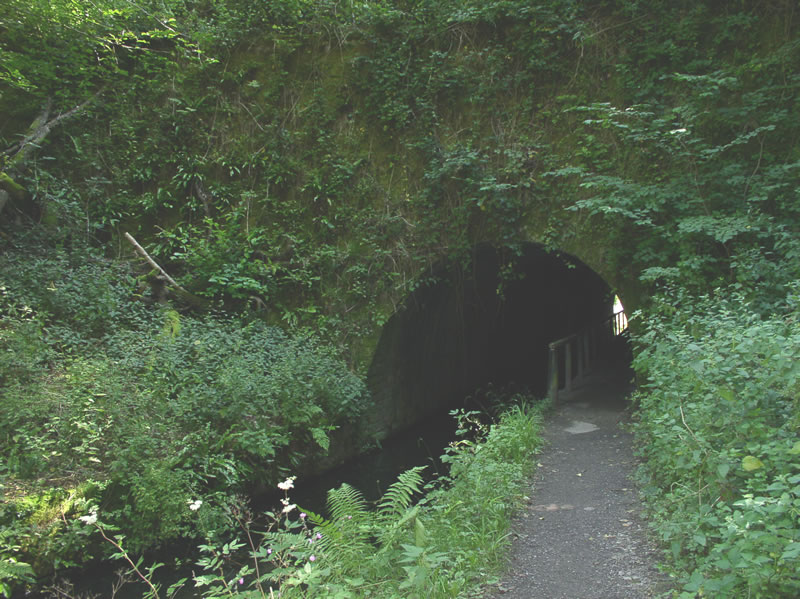
Gregory Tunnel entrance near Lea Wood

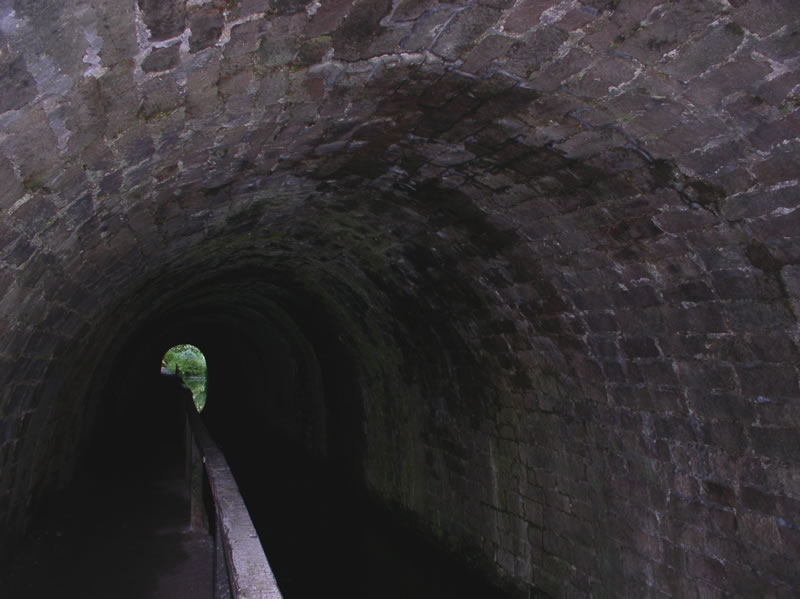
Inside Gregory Tunnel

== Operation ==
Jessop had based his initial predictions for the expected returns on the carriage of limestone from Cromford and Crich and coal from Pinxton. However, the canal itself encouraged new enterprises.

The canal mostly carried coal, lead and iron ore, some extracted from inside the Butterley Tunnel. Copper was brought from as far away as Ecton Hill in Staffordshire and the canal opening the way for lead from Ecton, as well as Wirksworth to be taken to the Lead Market at Hull and chert from Bakewell to the Potteries. It also allowed the finished products of the area to be exported widely, the Butterley Company's castings and Arkwright's spun cotton. The opening of the Derby Canal and the Nottingham Canal, both in 1796, further facilitated the latter's trade with these textile centres.

Although Arkwright had suggested that water should be drawn from the Derwent (by raising his weir at Masson Mill and feeding it via an aqueduct to Cromford Meadows – thus improving his plans for quarries behind Willersley and adding extra power to his mill wheels at the expense of the canal company), the canal committee had secretly no intention of so doing. The proprietors changed the line of the canal to its present terminus, where a connection was made to the Cromford sough, even though they had to purchase the land from Arkwright at £1,000 and landscape (at unknown cost) the grounds of his then house. Water could be drawn from the sough at night as well as on Sundays, when Cromford Mill was not working. Coming from underground, it was slightly warm, and it was said that it never froze. (Arkwright had been using the sough water to power Cromford Mill since the previous century.) The opening of the Nottingham Canal provided further water via the Butterley Reservoir, almost above Butterley Tunnel and on the summit level of the Cromford Canal.

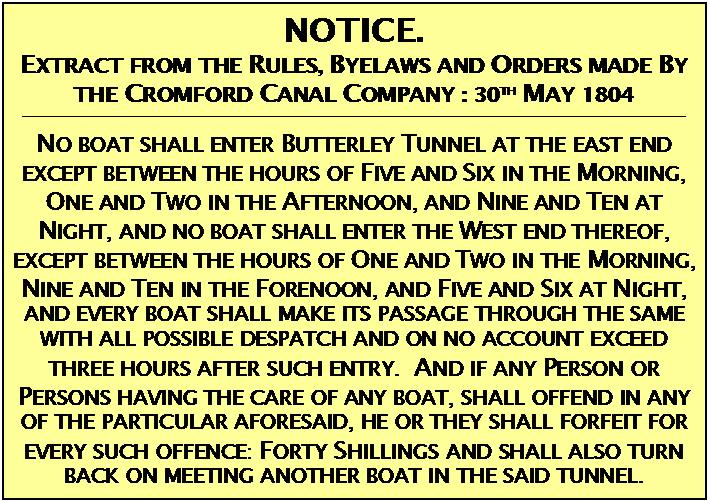
The sign displayed at both ends of Butterley tunnel

The sign illustrated (left) was displayed at both ends of the Butterley tunnel, and stressed the importance of only using the narrow tunnel in any one direction at particular times. There are reported instances of fines levied for non-compliance with these rules.

In 1819 the Mansfield and Pinxton Railway opened up trade with Mansfield including moulding sand for the foundries.

In 1831, the Cromford and High Peak Railway opened a route up to Manchester

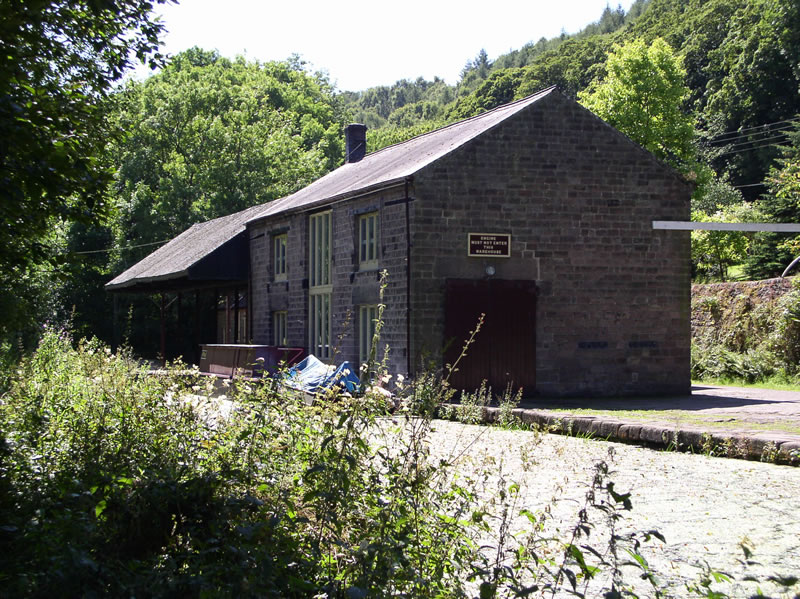
Wharf buildings at High Peak Junction

The canal also carried limestone from the Butterley Company's quarry at Crich with a plateway to the Amber Wharf at Bullbridge. In an attempt to avoid using cable-haulage or a rack and pinion system, a remarkable steam engine, the "Steam Horse" was tried out in 1813.

In 1840 when the North Midland Railway was built, George Stephenson was faced with the problem at Bullbridge of taking the line over the road but under the canal, thus the Bullbridge Aqueduct, in its final form, placed the river, road, railway and canal at four levels.

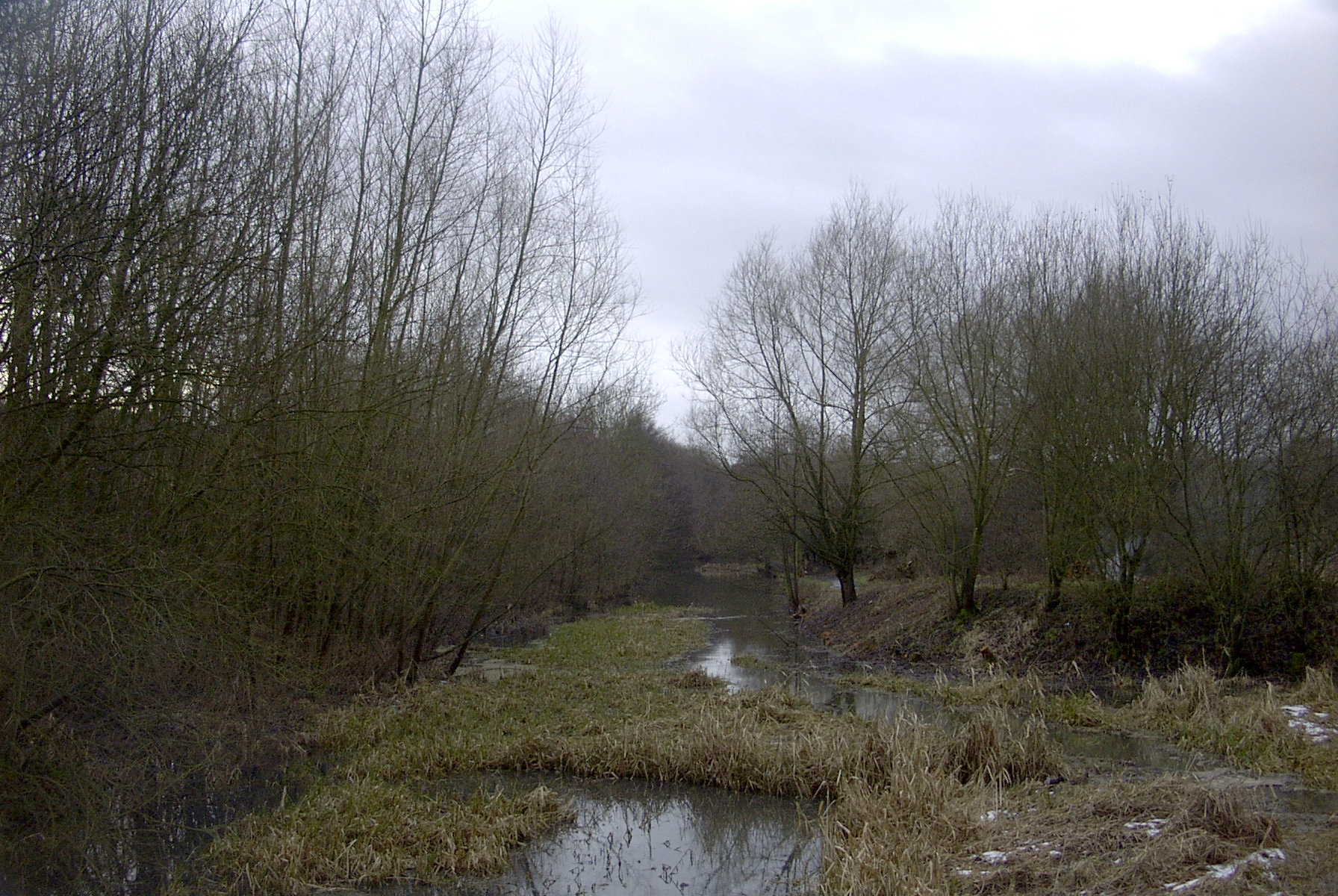
A section of the canal in shallow water just before the Codnor Park Reservoir

In 1846 the mining beneath Wirksworth had reached such a depth that Meerbrook Sough was built, draining into the Derwent near Whatstandwell, which deprived both Arkwrights mill and the canal of water, leaving the latter with only that from Butterley Reservoir. Accordingly, the canal owners first hired a pump and then built the Leawood Pump House in 1849 buying a Cornish-type beam engine from Grahams of Elsecar.

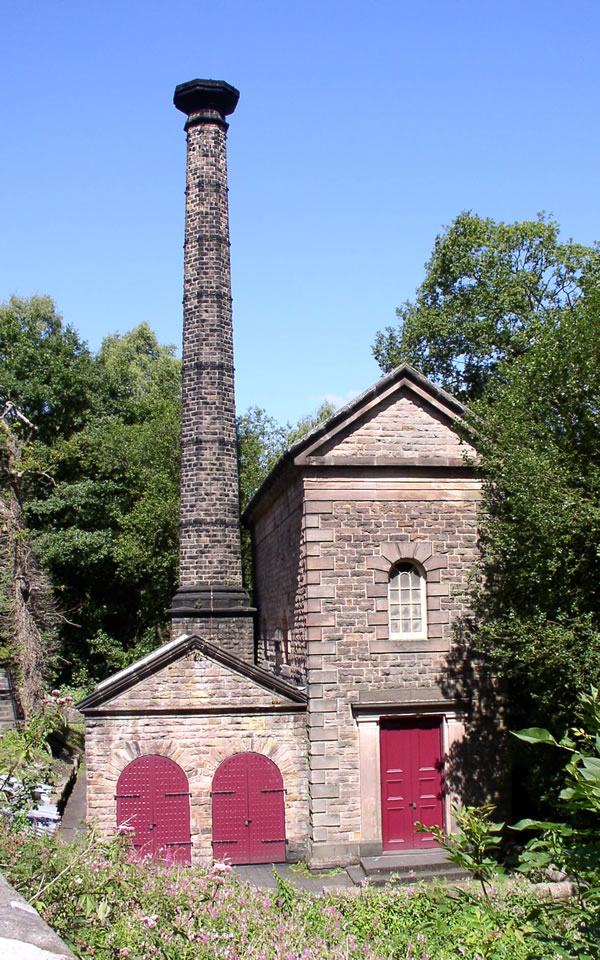
Leawood pump house

== Decline ==
In 1802 the canal had carried over 150,000 tons and by 1842 nearly 300,000, then in 1849, the Manchester, Buxton, Matlock and Midlands Junction Railway was built alongside as far as Ambergate, which reached Manchester in 1867. A further line to Pye Bridge was built in 1875. By 1888 trade had shrunk to 45,000 tons a year.

The Cromford Canal Sale Act 1846 (9 & 10 Vict. c. ccxc) authorised a merger with the MBM&MJR. The sale was not carried through until 1852 by which time the Midland Railway and the LNWR had assumed joint control and, with railway lines from Rowsley through Ambergate to the north and south, it was being used for little more than local traffic.

In 1889, subsidence closed the 3,063-yard (2,801 m) Butterley Tunnel for four years, and further subsidence in 1900 resulted in the tunnel being permanently closed. Most of the canal was abandoned by the London Midland and Scottish Railway (Canals) Act 1944 (8 & 9 Geo. 6. c. ii) with the exception of a one-half mile (0.8 km) stretch to Langley Mill which was abandoned by the British Transport Commission Act 1962 (10 & 11 Eliz. 2. c. xlii). The Bullbridge Aqueduct was removed in 1968 when the Ripley road was widened. In 1985 the Codnor Park Reservoir was lowered by 6 feet (1.8 m) and a lock was removed as part of a flood prevention scheme.

== Restoration ==
Before the canal was abandoned because it no longer served a commercial purpose, there were official moves to consider its future. As part of the parliamentary discussion for the Transport Bill in November 1952, the British Transport Commission talked to various county and local authorities to see whether they would be interested in acquiring canals, and the Cromford was one of those. At the time, the Inland Waterways Association (IWA) had the canal earmarked as one that could be restored. The Inland Waterways Preservation Society proposed in 1959 that the upper reaches of the canal, including the Leawood pumping station, should be retained. In 1961, Ripley Urban District Council withdrew an earlier proposal to close the canal, and supported Derbyshire County Council in their proposal that the canal should be maintained for its amenity value. By 1971, Derbyshire County Council were actively considering including the upper reaches of the canal in a High Peak Park development scheme. The transfer of ownership of the top 5 miles (8.0 km) of canal between Cromford and Ambergate from the British Waterways Board to Derbyshire County Council was reported in October 1972 in a new magazine called Waterways World, launched to highlight the growing interest in canal restoration schemes. The Cromford Canal Society (CCS) was formed at the same time, to manage the restoration. The cociety was registered with the Charity Commission on 3 October 1972. By the time the IWA held their National Rally in 1974, they announced growing interest in a plan to restore the lower reached of the Cromford Canal as well.

Volunteers began working on the Cromford end of the canal from around 1968, well before the transfer of ownership to Derbyshire County Council. Their first priority was to improve the towpath, which they did with large quantities of limestone and the use of borrowed dumper trucks. They also attempted to create a drainage channel, so that water could pass down the canal rather than becoming a flood hazard in times of heavy rain. As confidence grew, they repaired leaks in the banks, and borrowed two Smalley excavators for the Waterway Recovery Group to begin dredging the channel, but they were too small for the job. When ownership transferred to Derbyshire County Council, they obtained a second-hand nine-ton Smith 14 tracked excavator which was much more suitable. Much of the clearance work was achieved by driving the machine along the canal bed, and by 1977 they were able to drive it out of the canal at Leawood, ready for re-watering the canal.

By mid-1977, the canal was in water, and a horse-drawn trip boat was operating on some weekends. This proved to be popular, and regular weekend trips were operated in 1978, with around 8,000 visitors enjoying the experience. The trip boat, named the John Gray, was lengthened from 40 feet (12 m) to 50 feet (15 m) in January 1979 and to 60 feet (18 m) In 1982, Some 15,000 passengers were carried in 1982. As the scope of the project grew, the society transformed itself into a limited company on 4 January 1979, and employed a full-time worker later that month. The Manpower Services Commission had launched the Job Creation Scheme in October 1975, and the Cromford Canal became one of 20 canals to benefit from this, when in February 1979 they organised a team of workers to carry out maintenance and restoration. This continued for a decade, with the last group assisting the canal in 1988. Other groups which provided volunteer labour included engineering apprentices, Girl Guides, trainee nurses, Matlock Fire Brigade, Alfreton young offenders, Scouts, Foreign Exchange students and Army personnel.

The Leawood steam pumping station was restored to working order. Volunteers began visiting it in 1971, by agreement with the British Waterways Board, to assess what was required, and to understand its operation. Once Derbyshire County Council owned the canal, they applied for a grant of £5,613 from the Department of the Environment to refurbish the Grade II* listed building. After eight years, the engine was ready to steam again, and once the teething problems were resolved, the Duke and Duchess of Devonshire formally opened the pumping station on 3 May 1980. Later that day they also formally opened the canal, by cutting a ribbon tied across Cromford wharf.

Work continued to restore the canal beyond Leawood to Leashaw, passing through Gregory tunnel. Much of the clearance work was carried out using a Smalley excavator mounted on a pontoon. It got as far a Leashaw bridge, before it was needed further back along the canal. On 21 December 1988, the last day of working for the year's Job Creation Team, they made a trip on the John Gray from Cromford to Gregory Dam, beyond the tunnel, and back to Cromford. This was the only passenger boat to use this section of the canal, as heavy rainfall and high winds in February 1989 resulted in three spillways becoming blocked, and the canal over-topping its banks in two places, the first of which was at the same place that a breach had occurred in 1920. The canal beyond Leawood was drained, and was never used by trip boats. The Cromford Canal Society was wound up in 1990, and the canal gradually became derelict again.

=== Another attempt ===
After 12 years of neglect, a new organisation was formed to carry on restoration work. The Friends of the Cromford Canal was formed in March 2002, with the stated aim of restoring the whole canal for navigation. Most of the top 5 miles (8 km) of canal owned by Derbyshire County Council remains in water. In March 2013 dredging began on a 1.3-mile (2.1 km) length between Leawood Pumphouse and Cromford Wharf with the aim of making it navigable for narrowboats. Derbyshire CC funded this work, which was carried out by Ebsfleet Environmental using suction dredgers. The Friends of the Cromford Canal obtained a trip boat, originally built as a butty in 1938, but which had been used for trips on the Caldon Canal at Froghall until 2010. It arrived at Langley Mill in 2013, where the engine, fitted in 1995, was replaced by an electric drive, and then moved to Cromford by road. The historic cargo narrowboat, named Birchwood, has given visitors the opportunity to experience both horse-drawn and electric-powered trips along the dredged section since 2013.

Since 2001, most of the Ambergate to Cromford section of the canal has been within the Derwent Valley Mills World Heritage Site, with the final 547 yards (500 m) at Ambergate located within the Heritage Site buffer zone. The Derbyshire Wildlife Trust manage the section from Whatstandwell to Ambergate as it is a designated nature reserve. The whole canal has been a Site of Special Scientific Interest since 1981. The towpath from Ambergate to Cromford is a popular walking route, providing views of the adjacent Derwent Valley Line and access to Leawood Pump House and the High Peak Junction of the Cromford and High Peak Railway.

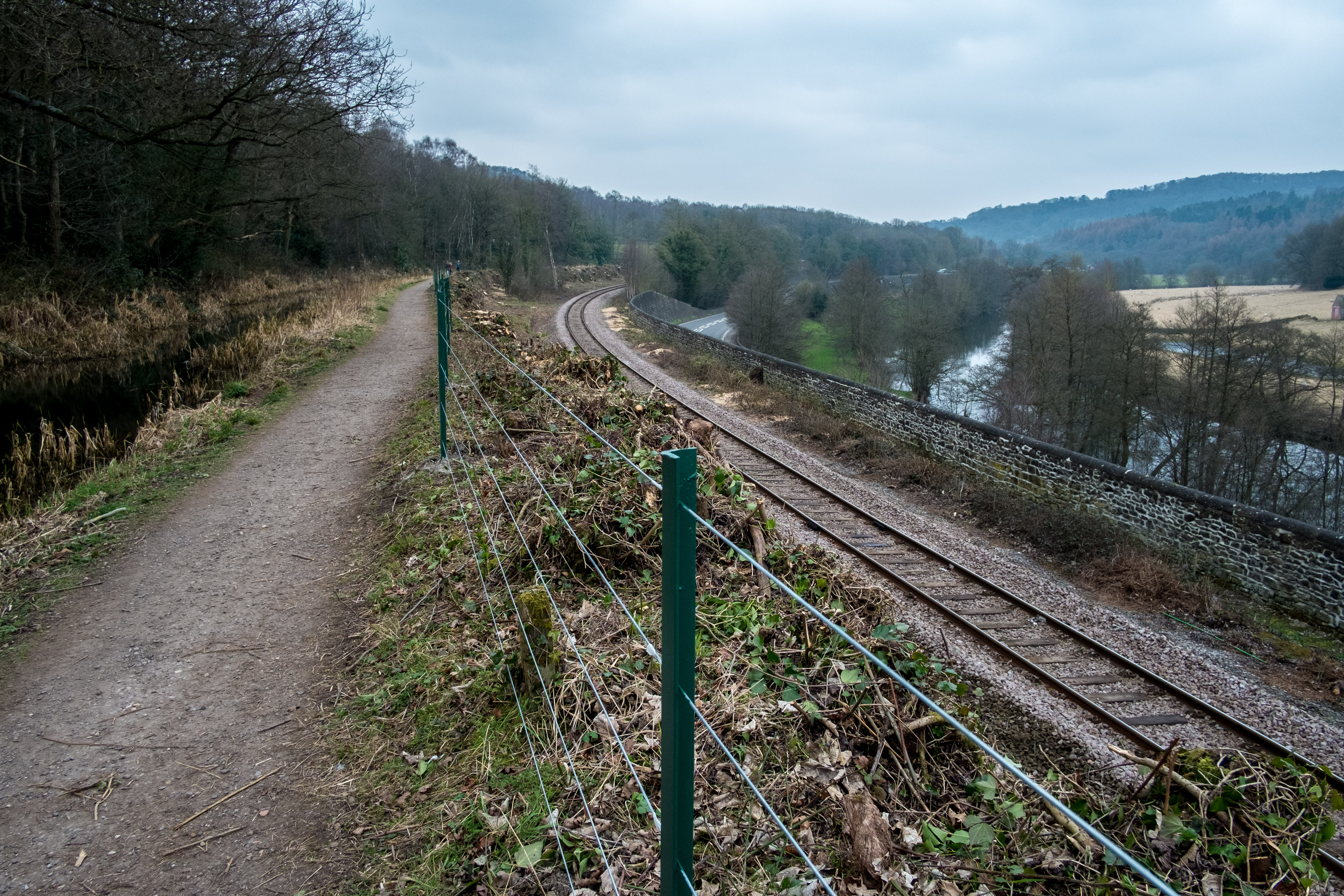
Looking South along the Cromford Canal, about 1km South of Whatstandwell. The picture clearly shows the four forms of transport along this section of the valley.

In late 2020, the Friends of the Cromford Canal were granted planning permission for a 1/2-mile (0.8 km) extension of the canal from Langley Mill towards Cromford, to be known as the Beggarlee Extension. The planning process took four years, as both Amber Valley and Broxtowe councils required onerous conditions to be met. The original route in this area was severed by the construction of the A610 road, which followed the course of the canal for a short distance. The extension will therefore be a new canal, with Beggarlee locks, a staircase pair, lifting the level of the canal sufficiently for it to pass under a bridge constructed for a former colliery railway. It will then skirt around the spoil heaps of Moorgreen Colliery, to rejoin the original route at Stoney Lane, Brinsley.

Construction began in mid-2023 on some enabling works, which were a pre-requisite to building the actual canal. These involved culverting two watercourses that crossed the work site, and the creation of a flood compensation area, since the canal will run across the Erewash flood plain, reducing its capacity. Spoil removed from the compensation area will be used to build up the banks of the new canal channel. Concern about whether the bridge foundations are strong enough to support the weight of a canal means that the canal will be carried beneath the road in a concrete aqueduct, supported on foundations which are beyond those that were constructed for the bridge.

== Friends of the Cromford Canal ==
The Friends of the Cromford Canal is a charitable organisation whose aim is to see the restoration of the Cromford Canal for the benefit of the general public. The society promotes the restoration of the Canal to navigation, and to connect it to the national inland waterway system at the junction with the Erewash Canal at Langley Mill. The group runs a trip boat, Birdswood, between Cromford Wharf and Leawood Pump House, although even after dredging of the section in 2013 it is quite shallow. English actor Brian Blessed is the president of Friends of the Cromford Canal. His voice gives the recorded safety announcement for the tripboat.

== See also ==
- Canals of Great Britain
- History of the British canal system
- Cromford and High Peak Railway

== Bibliography ==
- Cooper, B (1991). Transformation of a Valley: The Derbyshire Derwent. Cromford: Scarthin. (originally by London: Heinemann, 1983) ISBN 0-907758-17-7
- Hadfield, Charles (1970). The Canals of the East Midlands (2nd ed.). David & Charles. ISBN 978-0-7153-4871-0.
- Schofield, R.B. (2000). Benjamin Outram 1764–1805 : an engineering biography. Cardiff: Merton Priory. ISBN 978-1-898937-42-5.
- Squires, Roger (2008). Britain's restored canals. Landmark Publishing. ISBN 978-1-84306-331-5.
- Stoker, Simon (15 December 2008). There and Back Again, Restoring the Cromford Canal 1968–1988. Amberley Publishing. ISBN 978-1-84868-153-8.
