= Textilfabrik Cromford =

Coordinates: 51.305833°N 6.853056°E

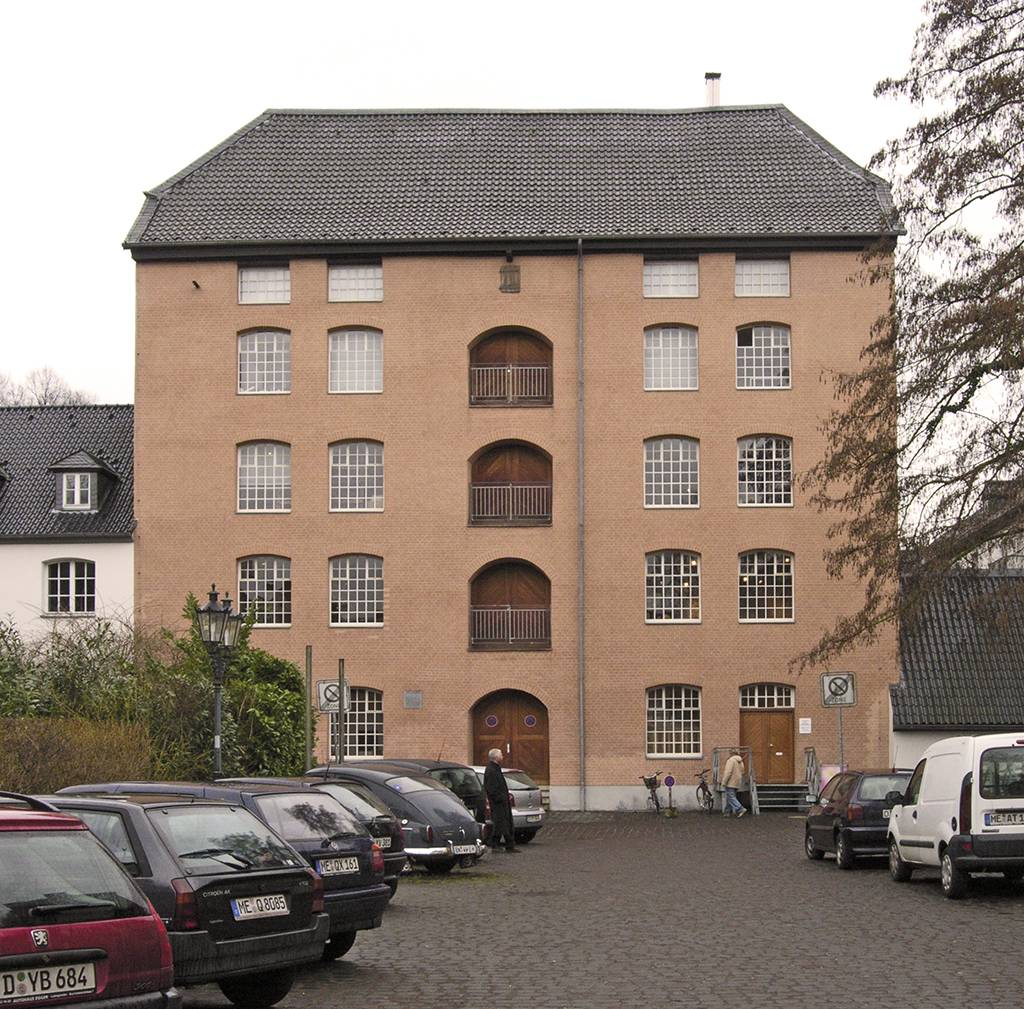
Ratingen, "Industriemuseum Cromford", Cotton mill

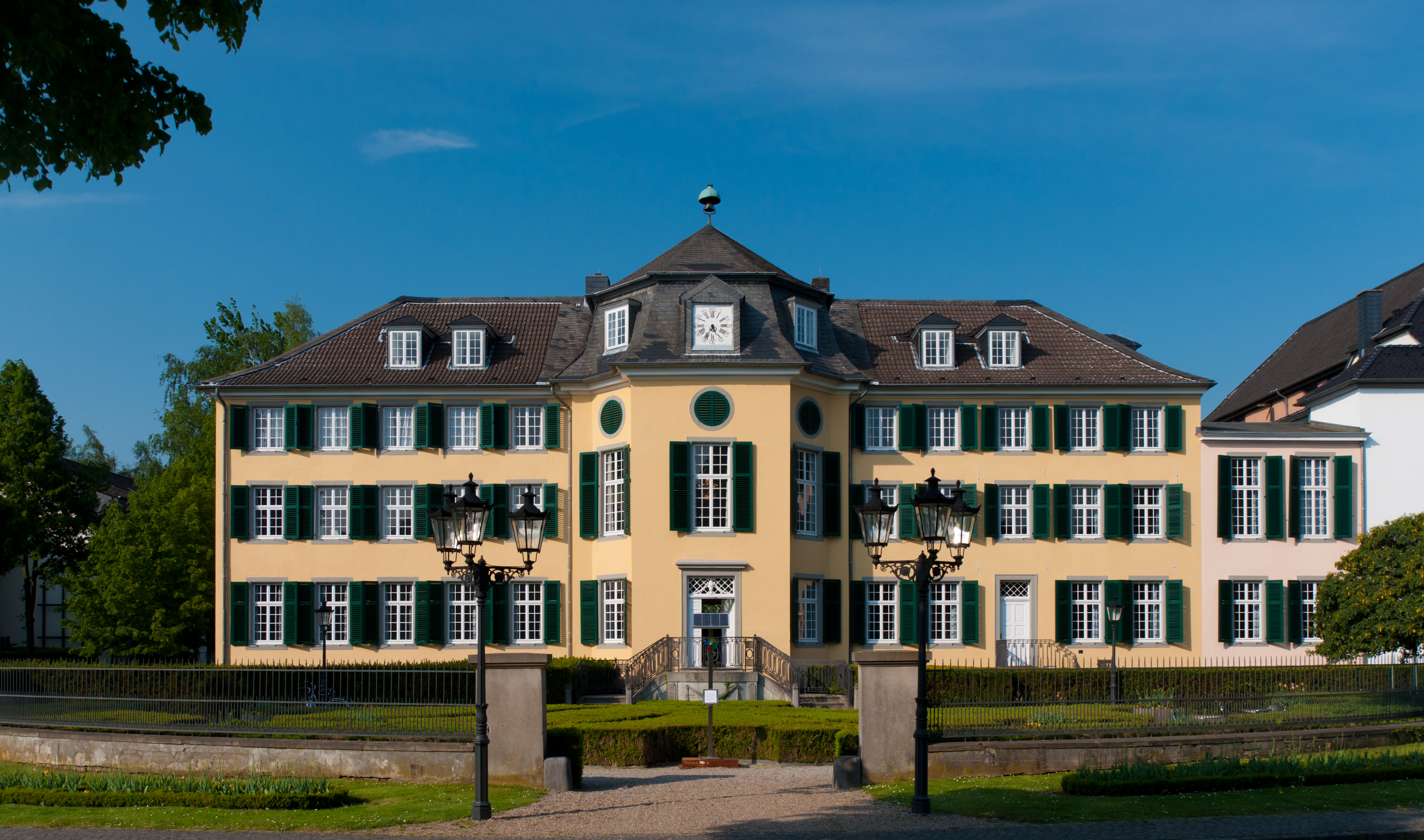
Herrenhaus (former villa of the owner)

The Textilfabrik Cromford in Ratingen, North Rhine-Westphalia, Germany was built in 1783 by Johann Gottfried Brügelmann. It was the first cotton spinning mill on the European mainland. Today it is an industrial museum specialising in textile history.

== History ==
Brügelmann, came from a rich Elberfelder trading family. He heard of the Waterframes, an invention of Richard Arkwright in the Derbyshire village of Cromford, England, in the early 1770s – during a long stay in Basel. On his return to Wuppertal the cotton market was booming, it was impossible to fulfill the demand. Brügelmann recognised the potential that Arkwright's mechanising of the labour-intensive Spinning process offered. As a rule of thumb each weaver needed all the yarn that 10 hand-spinners could produce.

Richard Arkwright vigorously guarded his patent. He would not reveal how the water frame worked, keeping the details secret. Furthermore, the British Government saw this as a state secret that must not be allowed to leave the country..

Brügelmann obtained a model of the Waterframe in 1783. He had already worked unsuccessfully for six years with experts from Siegerland to discover the workings of an Arkwright Carding machine: this made the sliver that was needed for the waterframe. It is unclear whether he got a model of this too, family papers suggest that he smuggled a spinner from Cromford over to Germany, with a collection of the parts needed to reconstruct the carding engine. In a letter to Prince-Elector Karl Theodor of the Palatinate and Bavaria he wrote he had a friend in England who had sent him the parts needed. Though it is possible that he worded this letter carefully, not leaving himself open to charges of Industrial espionage.

== Construction ==
Brügelmann looked for a suitable factory in the neighbourhood. In Wuppertal he was frustrated by a cartel of traders, with their rights to "Garnnahrung" and subsequent trading restrictions. Eventually he found a deserted oil-mill in the village of Eckamp. This has water extraction rights on Angerbach. It was just outside the town walls of Ratingens, next to the moated castle of Haus zum Haus. The Count gave him 12 year exclusive rights to construct and operate a cotton-spinning mill in this building.(Brügelmann had sought 40 year privileges, to compensate him for the initial investment). Recruiting a work-force in poverty stricken Ratingens was relatively simple: few said no to work and there was none of the rioting by weavers seen earlier in the decade in Elberfeld and Barmen.

He built two spinning halls, alongside the River Angerbach, hired further English-trained cotton workers to construct and operate water frames. In 1784, production started. All the machines were powered by waterwheels. He called the mill after the Derbyshire town. Today the area of Ratingen, between Hauser Ring, Mülheimer Straße and Junkernbusch is called "Cromford".

The business became prominent in the area: an imposing five storey factory building was erected, and then a luxurious villa for the owner costing 20.000 Reichstaler, (Herrenhaus in German). It also had a Baroque park, with an English Garden, laid out by Maximilian Friedrich Weyhe. Ten years after the mill opened, it was employing 400 workers; at that time an unprecedented number for a business. It peaked in 1802 at 600, then the exclusive privileges expired, and other manufacturers built bigger mills.

After the death of Brügelmann his sons continued the business. The business continued to expand and was still operating in the 1960s when the mill fell silent.

== Current usage ==
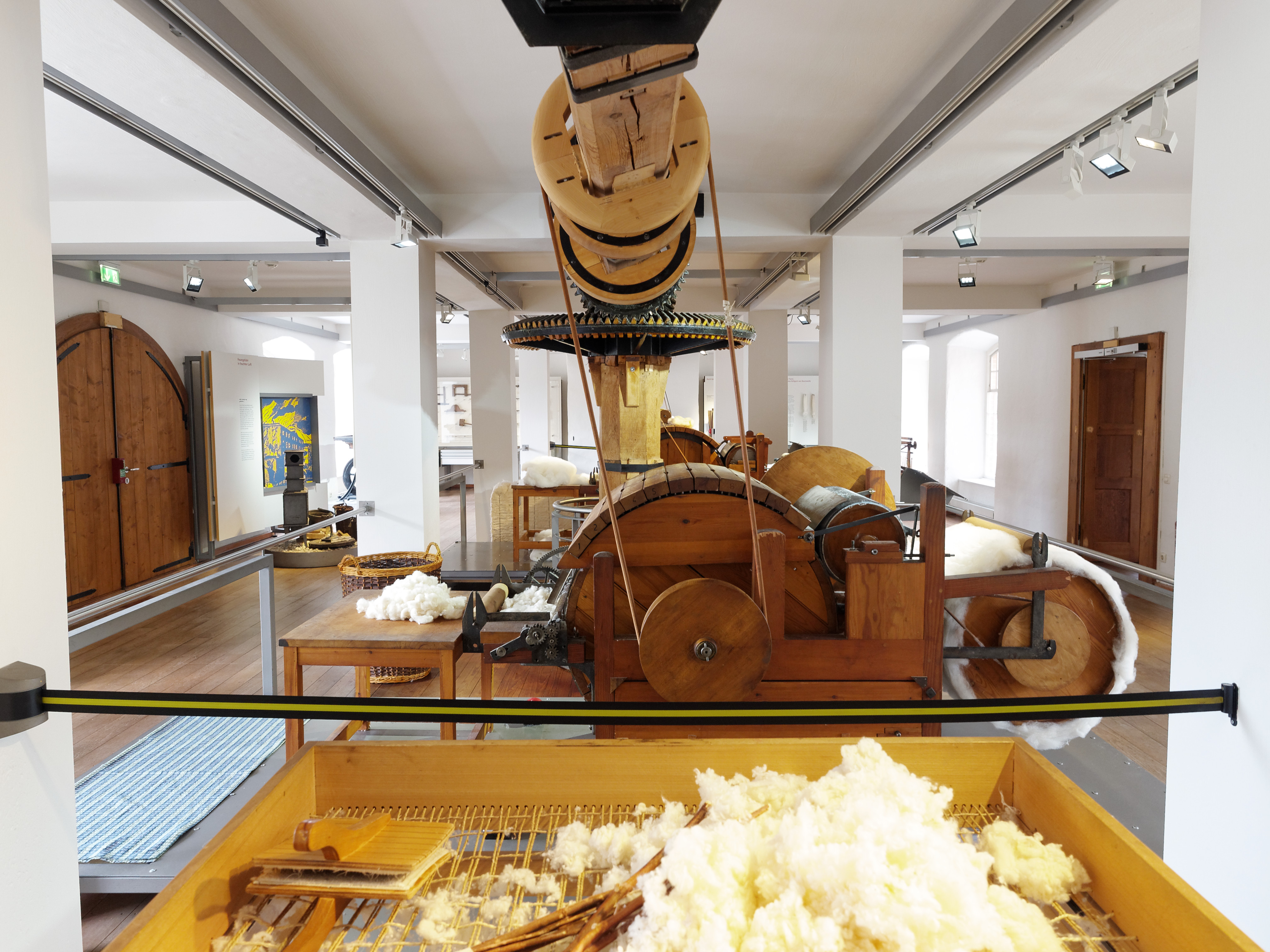
Preparation of cotton fibers

The additional modern buildings were demolished in the 1980s and replaced with housing. However the Herrenhaus, "Villa Cromford", and the original 5 storey factory, "Hohe Fabrik" remain.

In 1983 an archaeological study was commissioned, and the important industrial location was documented. The buildings became part of the Rheinischen Industriemuseums. Exact working replicas of all the important cotton machines from this time were installed in the old mill. All can be powered from the central waterwheel, and they can be seen working. Exhibitions on the history of the mill, the processes and the working conditions (including child labour) are on display.

The Garden Room of the Villa Cromford is used as a wedding venue.

== See also ==
Cromford Mills, Derbyshire
