= Henry Arkwright (cricketer, born 1811) =

English cricketer

Henry Arkwright (26 March 1811 – 13 January 1889) was an English cricketer with amateur status. He was associated with Cambridge University and made his debut in 1829.

He was born at Willersley Castle in Derbyshire and educated at Eton College and Trinity College, Cambridge. He became a Church of England vicar and was the vicar of Bodenham in Herefordshire, from 1842 until 1888, shortly before his death at Bodenham.

== Bibliography ==
- Haygarth, Arthur (1996) [1862]. Scores & Biographies, Volume 1 (1744–1826). Kennington: Frederick Lillywhite. ISBN 978-19-00592-23-9.
- Haygarth, Arthur (1997) [1862]. Scores & Biographies, Volume 2 (1827–1840). Kennington: Frederick Lillywhite. ISBN 978-19-00592-23-9.
