= Cromford Wharf =

Wharf in Derbyshire, England

Coordinates: 53°06′32″N 01°33′21″W

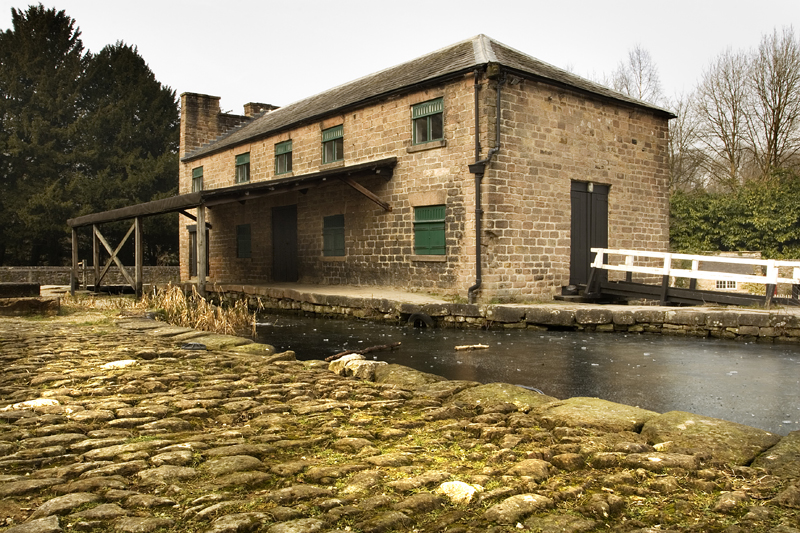
A former transit shed at Cromford Wharf.

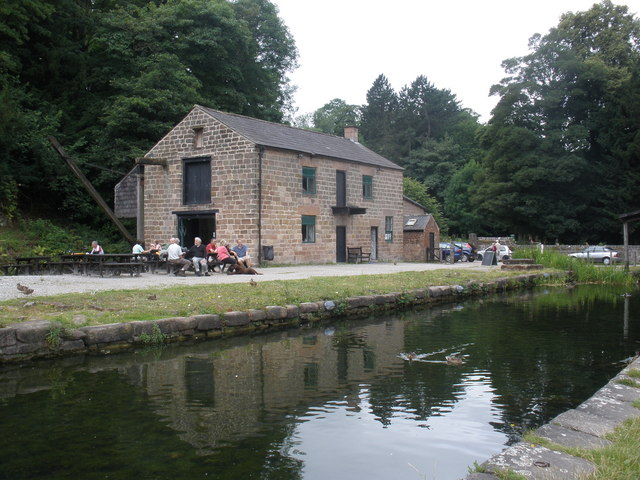
This building on the wharf is now a cafe.

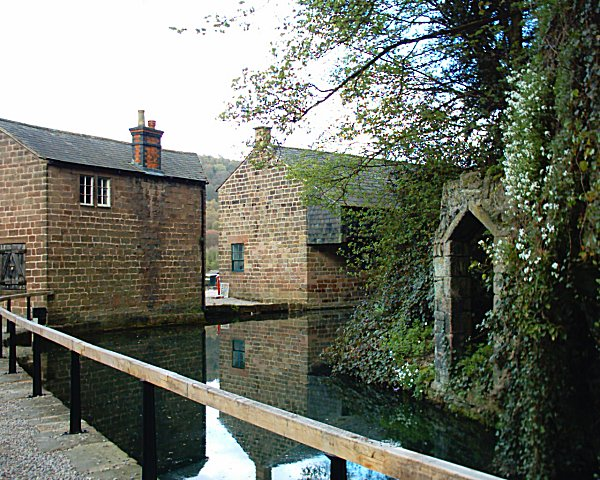
Rear of the buildings at Cromford Wharf.

Cromford Wharf is at Cromford in Derbyshire, England.

It is located at the northern terminus of the Cromford Canal, which opened in 1794 and ran 14.5 miles (23 km) from here to the Erewash Canal in Derbyshire. The wharf stands on Mill Lane opposite Richard Arkwright's Cromford Mill, and surviving buildings include two warehouses - one of which is now a cafe - an office or counting house, and two cottages. The wharf was once totally enclosed by a stone perimeter wall, which included other buildings, but these buildings have not survived.

The yard serves today as a car park.

The Canal Warehouse was built in 1794, soon after the canal opened, and is known as the Gothic Warehouse, after the design of the side elevation. (These Gothic castellations, just visible in the top picture, were probably included at the insistence of Sir Richard Arkwright, who would be able to see it from Willersley Castle, his intended home.) This warehouse was owned by Nathaniel Wheatcroft, a principal carrier on the canal. Today the Arkwright Society manages the Warehouse, having leased it since 1995, where two rooms are used as classrooms, and public exhibitions are sometimes held there. The Society offers tours of the Wharf and the canal.

A second warehouse was constructed in 1824, and was used to store goods awaiting carriage by boat, protected by the overhanging awning. Today a café and wildlife shop are open on the ground floor of this building.

Construction of the Counting House started in 1794.

The Wharf Cottages were built in 1796 for administrative staff.

The canal towpath, which starts at the Wharf, can be followed to High Peak Junction (the start of the High Peak Trail), and as far as Whatstandwell and Ambergate. This 6-mile (10 km) section is listed as a Biological Site of Special Scientific Interest (SSSI), and also forms part of the Derwent Valley Heritage Way.

== See also ==
- Canals of Great Britain
- History of the British canal system
- Listed buildings in Cromford
