= Cromford =

Village in Derbyshire, England

Coordinates: 53.108°N 1.561°W

- Village and Civil Parish
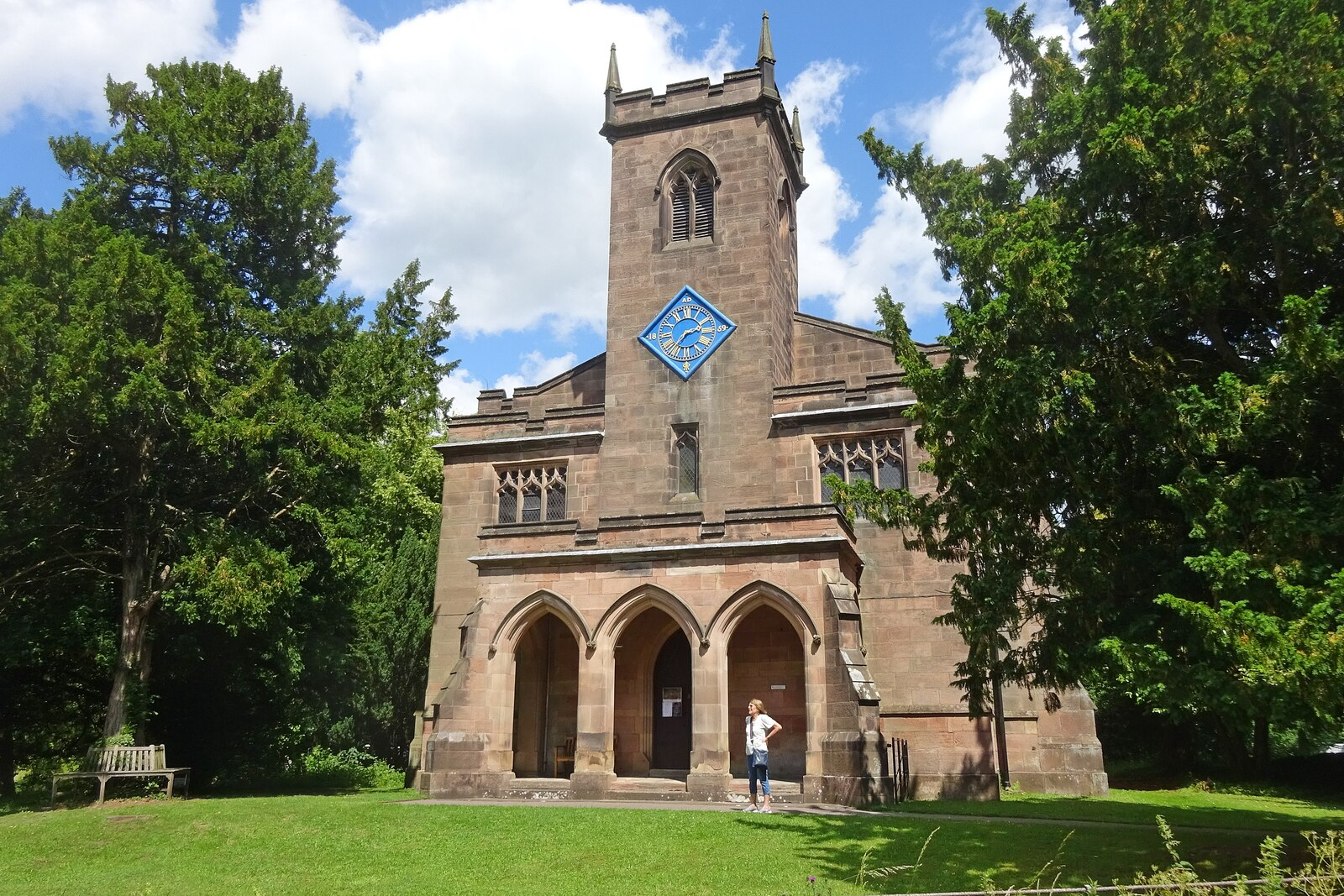
- St Mary’s Church

- Flag

- Location within Derbyshire
- Population: 1,433 (2011)
- OS grid reference: SK294570
- District: Derbyshire Dales
- Shire county: Derbyshire
- Region: East Midlands
- Country: England
- Sovereign state: United Kingdom
- Post town: MATLOCK
- Postcode district: DE4
- Dialling code: 01629
- Police: Derbyshire
- Fire: Derbyshire
- Ambulance: East Midlands
- UK Parliament: Derbyshire Dales

Cromford (/ˈkrɒmfərd/) is a village and civil parish in Derbyshire, England, in the valley of the River Derwent between Wirksworth and Matlock. It is 17 miles (27 km) north of Derby, 2 miles (3.2 km) south of Matlock and 1 mile (1.6 km) south of Matlock Bath.

Cromford is first mentioned in the 11th-century Domesday Book as Crumforde, a berewick (supporting farm) of Wirksworth, and this remained the case throughout the Middle Ages. The population at the 2011 Census was 1,433. It is principally known for its historical connection with Richard Arkwright and the nearby Cromford Mills, which he built outside the village in 1771. Cromford is in the Derwent Valley Mills World Heritage Site.

The Cromford mill complex, owned and being restored by the Arkwright Society, was declared by Historic England as "one of the country’s 100 irreplaceable sites". It is also the centrepiece of the Derwent Valley Mills UNESCO World Heritage Site.

In 2018, the Cromford Mills Creative Cluster and World Heritage Site Gateway Project was listed as a finalist for the Best Major Regeneration of a Historic Building or Place in the Historic England Angel Awards.

== Geography ==
The River Derwent, with its sources on Bleaklow in the Dark Peak, flows southward to Derby and then into the River Trent. The geology of this section in the Derbyshire Dales is that of limestone. The fast flowing river has cut a deep valley. The A6 trunk road, which was the main road between London and Manchester in former times, the Cromford Canal and the Derwent Valley Line, linking Derby and Matlock, were all built in the river valley. The Via Gellia valley joins the Derwent at Cromford; however, the stream which runs through that valley is actually the Ivonbrook and historically the valley was called the Ivonbrook Valley. The Via Gellia is simply the name of the road which runs along it, named after the Gell family who owned many mines in the area.

== History ==
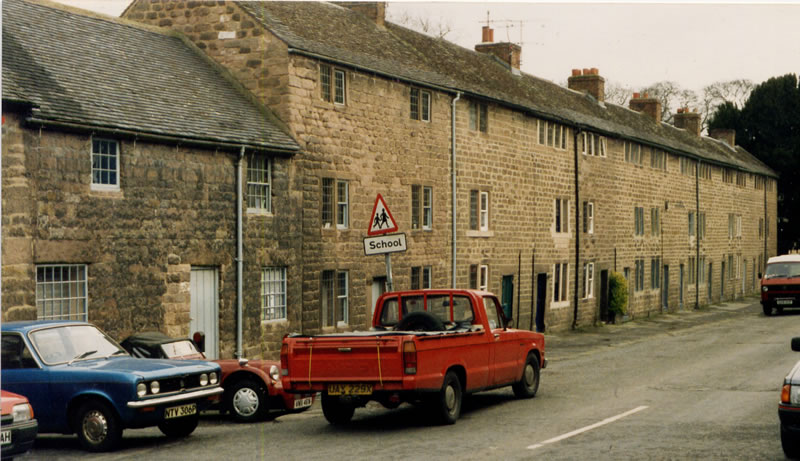
Workers cottages in Cromford, some having "weavers' windows" visible on the top floors

It is one of the significant sites in the development of the Industrial Revolution. Here, Richard Arkwright built his cotton mill to make use of the water frame.

More specifically, according to Peak District Online, "Cromford is also known as the 'cradle' or `birthplace` of the Industrial Revolution for this was where Richard Arkwright (1732–1792), perhaps Britain's first ever `industrial tycoon` and known as `The Father of the Factory System` chose to build the world's first water-powered cotton mill in 1771."

The Gell family, who were local Hopton landowners heavily involved in the nearby Wirksworth lead mining district, had the Via Gellia built to connect Cromford and Grangemill in the late 18th century.

Various cottages and farm buildings pre-date Arkwright's time, but a large part of the village was built to house the mill workers. One source states that these are now considered to be "the first factory housing development in the world". Employees were provided with shops, pubs, chapels and a school.

Willersley Castle, now a Grade II* listed building, was also built by Richard Arkwright in 1791; after a fire in 1792, it was rebuilt and occupied by his son Richard Arkwright junior starting in 1796.

In the early 1800s, Scarthin Nick was "blasted through with dynamite to make way for what later became the A6, thus annexing the Arkwright industrial mill complex on the east side of the main Derby road and the Market Place and village at the bottom of the hill which climbs steeply westward towards Wirksworth, on the other".

The 20th century saw the development of council and private housing. Dene quarry, currently operated by Tarmac Ltd for the production of aggregates and roadstone, was excavated to the south west of the village from 1942 onwards.

In December 2001 a 15 miles (24 km) corridor from Masson Mill in Matlock Bath to the Silk Mill in Derby and including the mills in Cromford, Milford, Belper and Darley Abbey was declared the Derwent Valley Mills World Heritage Site. Masson Mill was described by the Peak District Online in 2006 as "perhaps the most prominent of Arkwright’s constructions ... and still in use today as a heritage site museum and retailer outlet".

== Cultural references ==
The 1931 novel Saturday Night at the Greyhound by John Hampson takes place over the course of one evening in the bar at the Greyhound Hotel, Cromford.

In late 2006, Anand Tucker used certain parts of Cromford, including its historic bookshop, for his film And When Did You Last See Your Father?, based on the autobiographical memoir by poet Blake Morrison. Colin Firth plays the adult Blake, with Jim Broadbent cast as his dying father.

An industrial site in the German town of Ratingen is named Textilfabrik Cromford after Cromford, as this is where the industrial pioneer Johann Gottfried Brügelmann in 1783 erected the first factory outside England, using Arkwright's factory as an archetype. The factory today forms part of the Rheinisches Industriemuseum.

Cromford railway station is located on the Matlock–Derby Derwent Valley Line and can be seen on the cover of the 1995 Oasis single "Some Might Say".

== Governance ==
Historically, Cromford was part of the Wirksworth Wapentake or Hundred; this administrative area, also known as the Soke of Wirksworth (the "small county of Wirksworth"), soon became West Derbyshire Council and is now called Derbyshire Dales District Council. The village is run locally by the Cromford Parish Council.

== Transport ==
The A6, which links Carlisle with Luton, passes just to the north of the village; it provides easy access to Manchester, Stockport, Bakewell, Matlock and Derby.

Cromford railway station is served by trains along the Derwent Valley line between Derby and Matlock. The route is operated by East Midlands Railway, with services stopping generally hourly in both directions.

== Landmarks ==
The Cromford Mills (1771) buildings and accommodation for workers to staff the factories form part of the Derwent Valley Mills, which is recognised as a World Heritage Site for its importance. North Street, constructed by Arkwright, is important as a very early purpose-built industrial workers' housing, and was rescued from dereliction in the 1970s by the Ancient Monument Society who have since sold off the houses. One house in the street is now a Landmark Trust holiday cottage.

Masson Mill (1783) is on the northern fringe of the village.

Willersley Castle dominates the hill on the east side of the river, with commanding views of Masson Mill, the village, and the road from Derby. Commissioned by Richard Arkwright, building work began in 1790, but was delayed by a fire in 1791. Richard Arkwright died in 1792, and the building was occupied by his son Richard in 1796. The Arkwright family moved out in 1922, and the building was acquired by some Methodist businessmen, and opened to guests as a Methodist Guild hotel in 1928. During World War II, the building was used as a maternity hospital by the Salvation Army while evacuated from their hospital in the East End of London.

St Mary's Church, built between 1792 and 1797 by Richard Arkwright.

The Cromford Canal – built to service the mills – is now disused, but has been designated a Site of Special Scientific Interest (SSSI). The canal tow-path can be followed from Cromford Wharf to High Peak Junction, and on to Whatstandwell and Ambergate. The Cromford and High Peak Railway, completed in 1831, ran from High Peak Junction to the Peak Forest Canal at Whaley Bridge. Its trackbed now forms the High Peak Trail, a walk and cycle route which is joined by the Tissington Trail at Parsley Hay.

== Notable residents ==
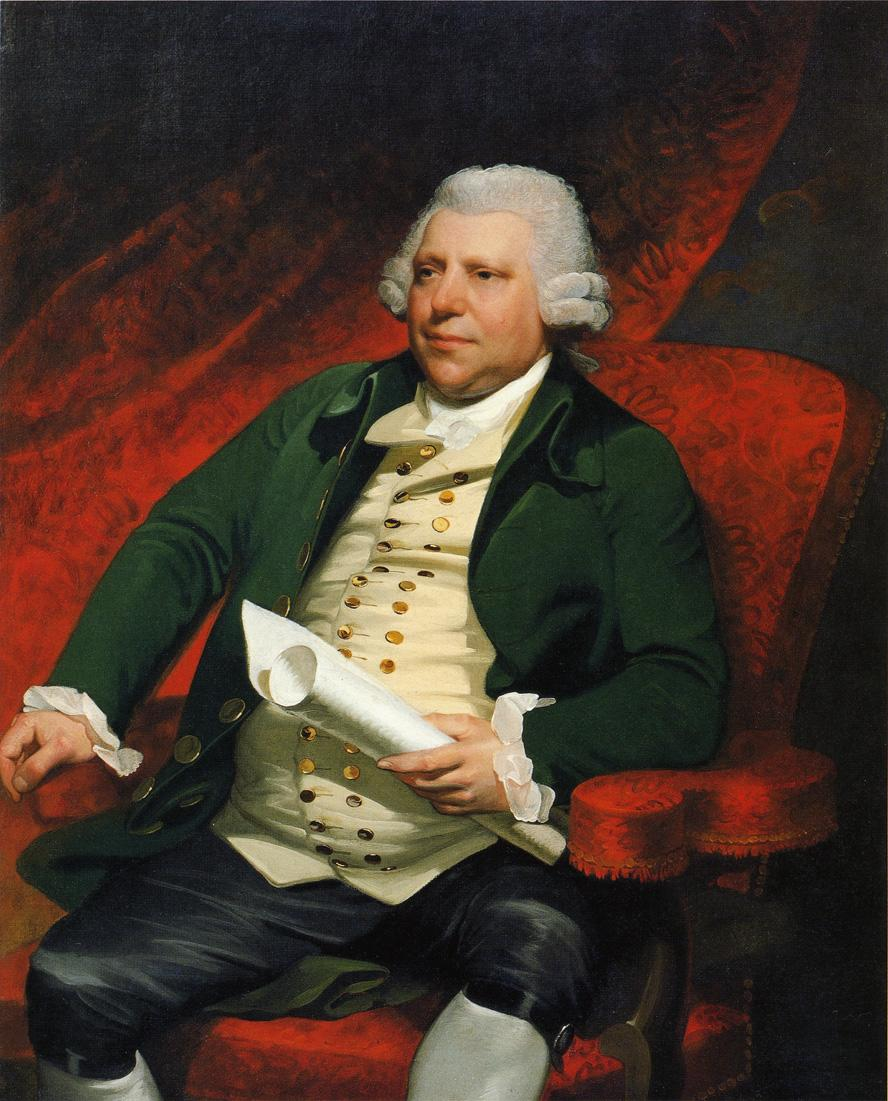
Sir Richard Arkwright, 1790

- Sir Richard Arkwright (1732–1792), inventor and a leading entrepreneur during the early Industrial Revolution; helped develop the spinning frame, died locally.
- Richard Arkwright junior (1755–1843), the son of Sir Richard Arkwright, a mill owner, turned banker, investor and financier
- Francis Hurt (1803–1861), from Alderwasley Hall, a politician and MP for South Derbyshire 1837-1841
- George Turner (1841–1910), landscape artist and farmer.
- Alison Uttley, (1884–1976), writer, wrote about Little Grey Rabbit, born nearby at Castle Top Farm
- Charles Brown (1884–1940), politician and MP for Mansfield, 1929–1940

=== Sport ===
- Jack Fryer (1877–1933), footballer he played 315 football games including 173 for Derby County
- Ian Ray Buxton (1938–2010), footballer and cricketer, he played 216 football games including 145 for Derby County

== Gallery ==
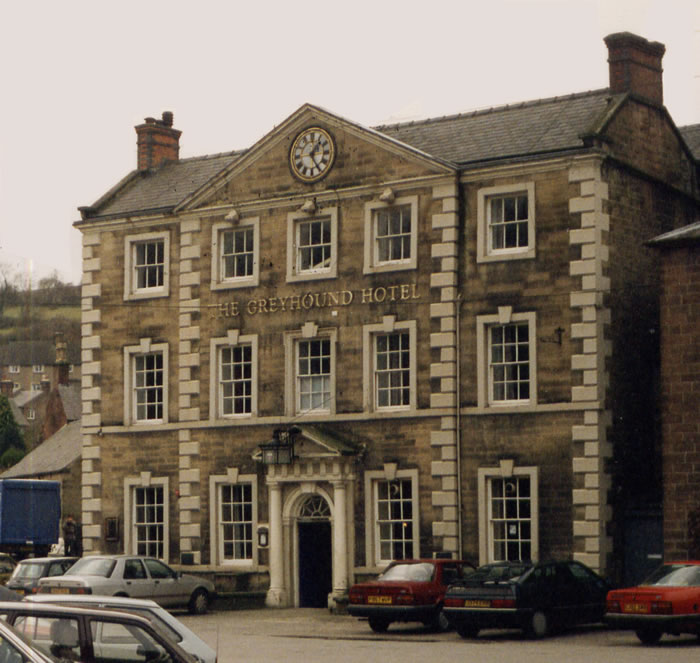
The Greyhound Hotel built for Richard Arkwright in 1778 for the use of businessmen and others visiting the mills.

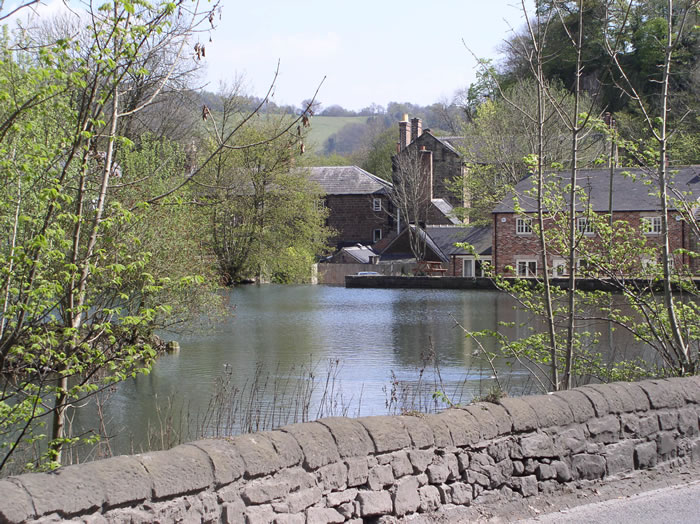
Cromford Pond built in 1785 as the pound for Cromford Mills.

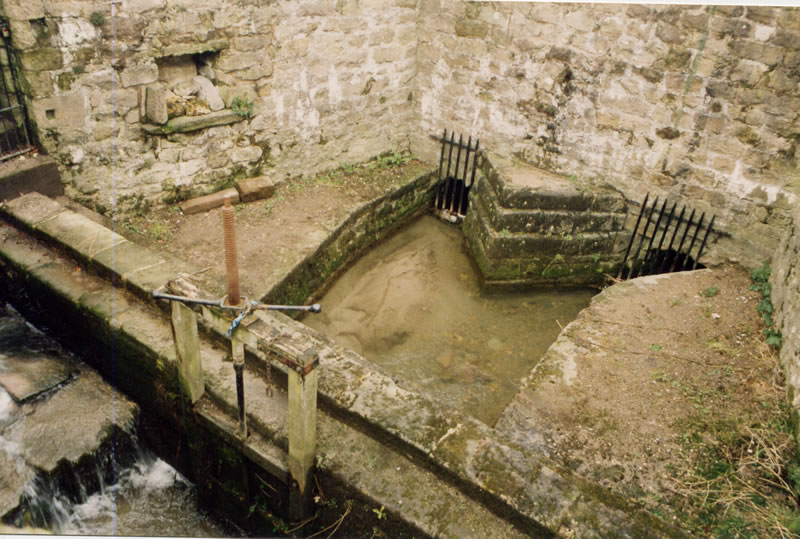
This shuttle, locally known as "The Bear Pit" controlled the water from the sough into Cromford Pond.

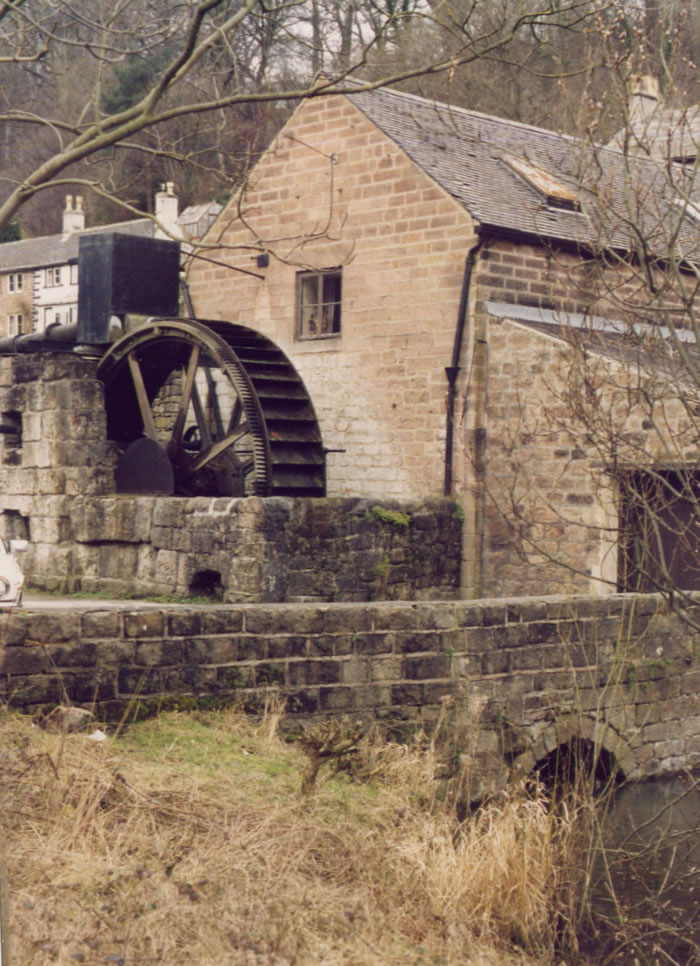
A mid-nineteenth century water wheel for a mill grinding locally mined barytes. It is no longer used for any purpose but can be seen turning on occasion.

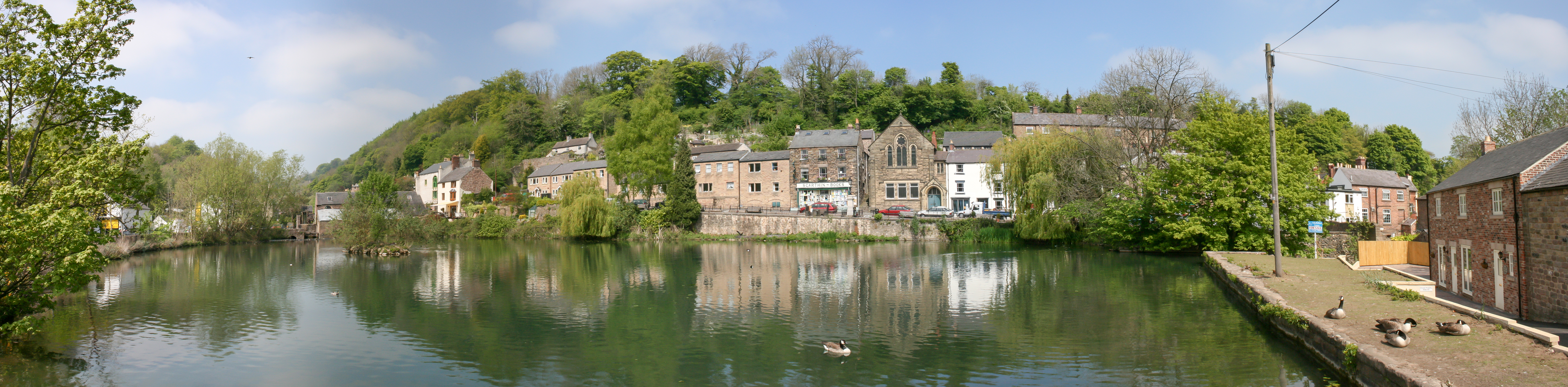
Panorama of Cromford's mill pond

== See also ==
- Listed buildings in Cromford
- Cromford War Memorial
