= Cromford railway station =

Railway station in Derbyshire, England

Coordinates: 53.113°N 1.549°W

Cromford
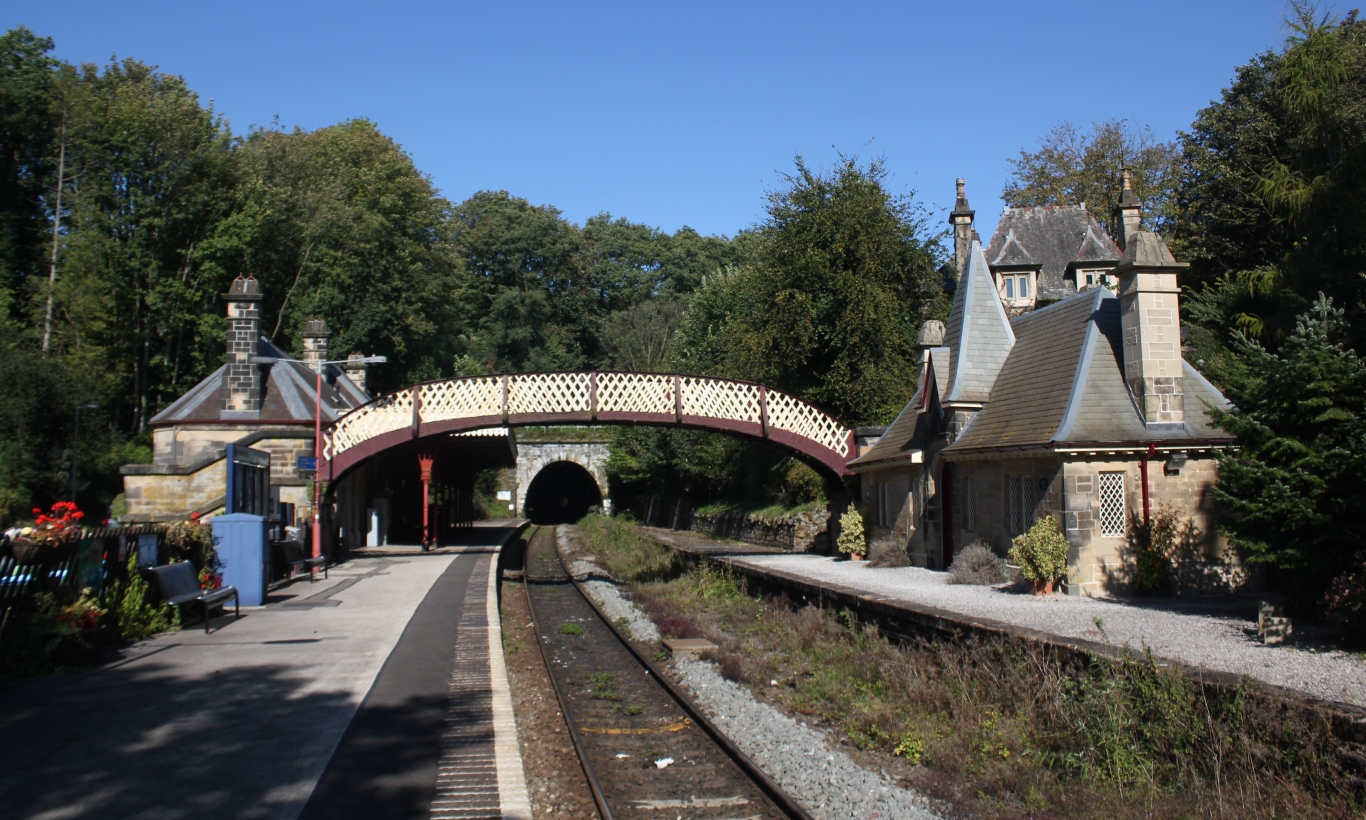

General information
- Location: Cromford, Derbyshire Dales; England
- Grid reference: SK302574
- Manager: East Midlands Railway
- Platforms: 1

Other information
- Station code: CMF
- Classification: DfT category F2

History
- Opened: 4 June 1849

Passengers
- 2021/22: ▲29,452
- 2022/23: ▲35,328
- 2023/24: ▲40,752
- 2024/25: ▲49,680
- 2025/26: ▲52,468
Location
Notes
- Passenger statistics from the Office of Rail and Road

Cromford railway station serves the village of Cromford in Derbyshire, England. It is on the Derwent Valley Line, which connects Derby with Matlock; it is located 15 1/2 miles (24.9 km) north of Derby. The station, which is Grade II listed, is owned by Network Rail and managed by East Midlands Railway.

== History ==
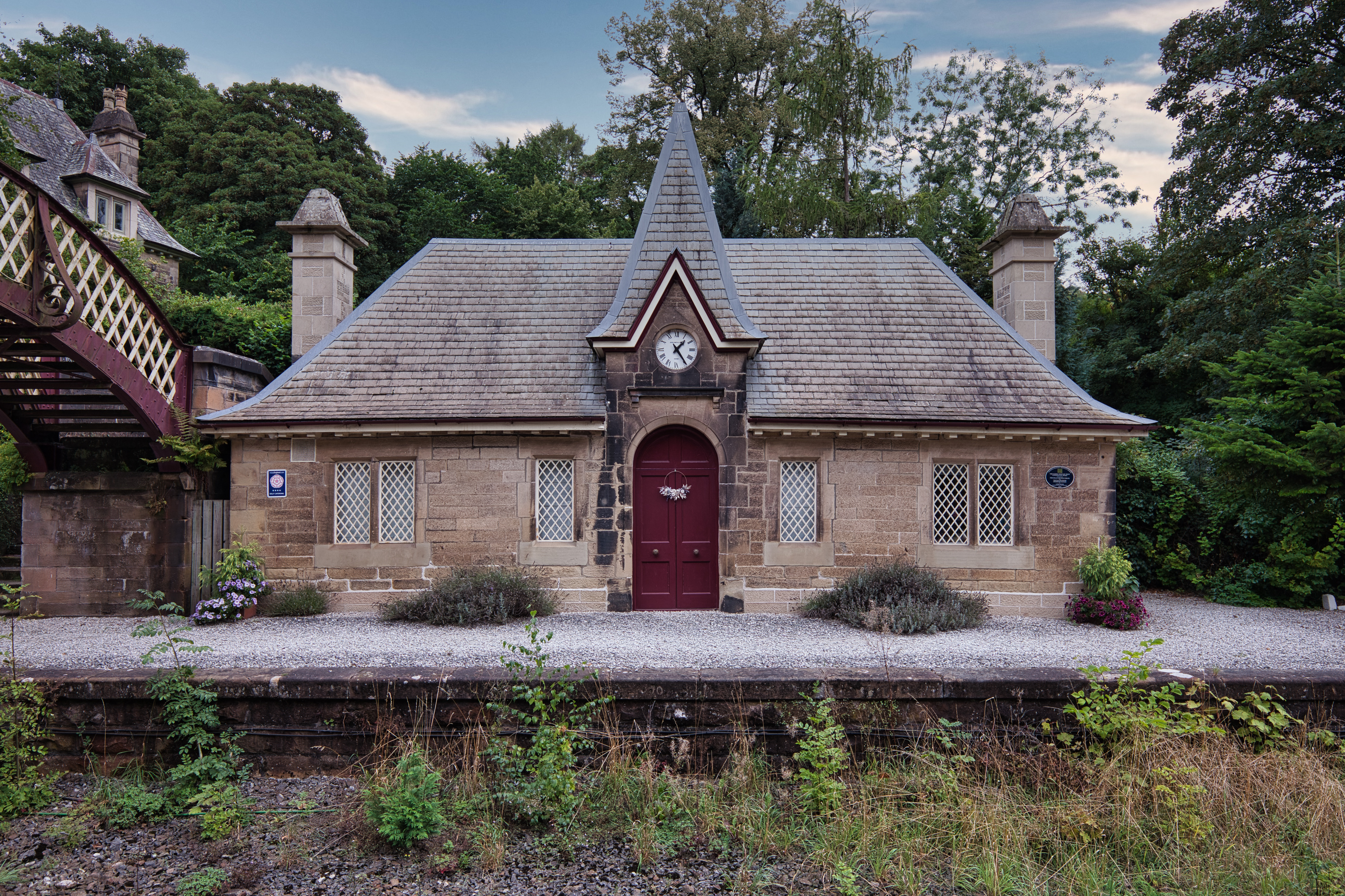
Platform 2 (southbound) is no longer used by trains, but its ornate waiting room is used as a holiday cottage

Known originally as Cromford Bridge, it was opened by the Manchester, Buxton, Matlock and Midland Junction Railway in 1849. This is one of the few stations on the line that has been preserved and is a Grade II listed building. It is said to have been designed by G. H. Stokes, son-in-law of Joseph Paxton. It is believed that Stokes designed Station House (built in 1855), the extremely ornate former station master's residence opposite the station on the side of the hill as well as the ornate villa style waiting room, on what was the up platform. According to English Heritage, this is the original station building; the present building on the opposite (down) platform was added by the Midland Railway at a later date.

In 2024 Cromford Railway Station was named as "one of the five most beautiful and remarkable [railway stations] in the world".

Willersley Tunnel, which is 764 yards (699 m) long, is situated immediately north of the station.

Following many years of neglect and decline, a long lease on the main station building was purchased by the Arkwright Society; the building has been restored and improved, re-opening as office space in May 2009. Station House, of which the old waiting room is a part, is now self-contained holiday accommodation.

In the year from 1 April 2009 to 31 March 2010, journeys from the station had increased by 16.88%.

On 17 September 2009, taxi driver Stuart Ludlam was murdered at the station by gun fanatic Colin Cheetham.

== Services ==
All services at Cromford are operated by East Midlands Railway, using Class 170 diesel multiple units.

The typical off-peak service is one train per hour in each direction to and from Matlock and Lincoln, via Derby, Nottingham and Newark Castle with one train every two hours extending to Cleethorpes. On Sundays, the station is served hourly.

Preceding station	National Rail	Following station
Whatstandwell	East Midlands Railway Derwent Valley Line	Matlock Bath

== In popular culture ==
The disused southbound platform was used on the cover of the 1995 Oasis single "Some Might Say".

== See also ==
- Listed buildings in Cromford
