= Willersley Castle =

House in Derbyshire, United Kingdom

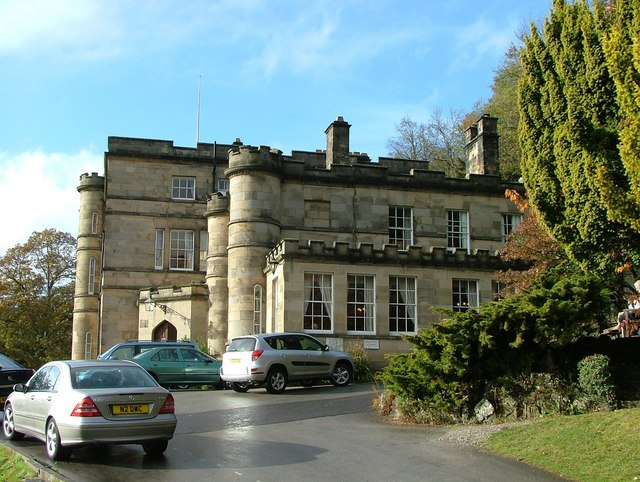
- Willersley Castle in 2008

- Location within Derbyshire
- Former names: Willersley Hall, Willersley Estate

General information
- Location: Cromford, England
- Coordinates: 53°6′40″N 1°33′30″W
- Ordnance Survey: SK2964857226
- Client: Sir Richard Arkwright
- Owner: Manor Adventure

Design and construction
- Architect: William Thomas

Listed Building – Grade II*
- Official name: Willersley Castle
- Designated: 22 June 1950
- Reference no.: 1248280

Willersley Castle is a late 18th-century country mansion above the River Derwent at Cromford, Derbyshire, outside Peak District National Park. The castle has been a Grade II* listed building since April 2000.

Standing in 60 acres (240,000 m^{2}) of grounds, the Classical-style castellated house is three storeys with a seven-bay frontage, the central bay flanked by full-height round towers. In recent years, the property operated as a hotel but was permanently closed and listed for sale in summer 2020.

== History ==
Originally named "Willersley Hall", it was built on the slopes of Wild Cat Tor, 400 feet (120 m) above sea level, for the occupation of the industrialist Sir Richard Arkwright by the architect William Thomas. A news item in 2016 stated that "with its turrets and crenellations, it was intended to resemble a castle". Arkwright had purchased the estate in 1782 from Thomas Hallet Hodges for £8,864. The land was previously known as Willersley Estate and had been purchased by Edwin Lascelles in 1759.

At the time of the Arkwright purchase there was no large house here, just a few farms and "Derwent House", which still stands off the main drive. Those farm buildings, later converted to residences, were sold by the estate some time before 2016. Arkwright planted many trees, though not before clearing away a large limestone rock, which cost £3,000.

In 1791, when the building was approaching completion, a fire broke out and severe damage was caused to part of the interior of the castle. Although the damage was repaired, Arkwright died in 1792 before the building was completed. Repairs were completed in 1792 by Thomas Gardner. In 1796, Richard Arkwright junior moved into the castle with his family; his son Peter inherited the estate in 1843. During the early 1800s, visitors to the nearby Matlock Bath spa, were invited to visit the castle property and tour the gardens and pleasure grounds. Members of the Arkwright family lived there until World War I. During the war, the castle served as a maternity hospital. The nearby St Mary's Church, Cromford, was originally built in 1802 as the Arkwright family chapel and was extensively modified decades later when it became a church.

Richard Arkwright sold the property in 1927 to Sir Albert Ball who split up the estate and sold the castle and its grounds to Methodist businessmen; they converted it to a Methodist Guild Holiday Centre. At an unstated later date, the stables were converted to residential use.

During World War II, the castle again served as a maternity hospital between 1940 and 1945. It subsequently returned to operating as a Methodist Guild hotel, then as a Christian Guild hotel. In 2020, the hotel had "some 30,000sq ft of living space over three floors, ... further accommodation in the mews house and gatehouse, grass tennis courts, a swimming pool and gym area" according to Country Life (magazine) in 2020.

A 2015 report provided these details about the gardens:

The design of the landscape is attributed to John Webb, a pupil of William Emes ... Although some design elements have been partially lost, the grounds of Willersley Castle, in the picturesque style, are of international importance and exceptional significance, which is reflected in their inclusion as one of the key features in the Derwent Valley Mills World Heritage Site, as well as on the National Heritage List for England’s Register of Parks and Gardens of Special Historic Interest at Grade II.

The hotel was temporarily closed during the COVID-19 pandemic lockdown in 2020. In July 2020, Methodist Guilds Holidays Limited announced that the hotel would not reopen. It was subsequently listed for sale.

In 2021 Willersley Castle was acquired by the residential outdoor education company Manor Adventure. It now offers residential accommodation for up to 90 school students to participate in a range of outdoor pursuits.

== The name Willersley ==
The name Willersley comes from the ancient manor or estate. The adjacent manors of Cromford and Willersley were partitioned in 1615.

The name Willersley also appears in:

- the nearby Willersley Tunnel, which is 764 yards (699 m) long and lies between Cromford railway station and Matlock railway station.
- the nearby Willersley Crag, also called Willersley Castle Rocks.

== See also ==
- Grade II* listed buildings in Derbyshire Dales
- Listed buildings in Cromford
