= Richard Arkwright junior =

British industrialist (1755–1843)

Richard Arkwright Jr.
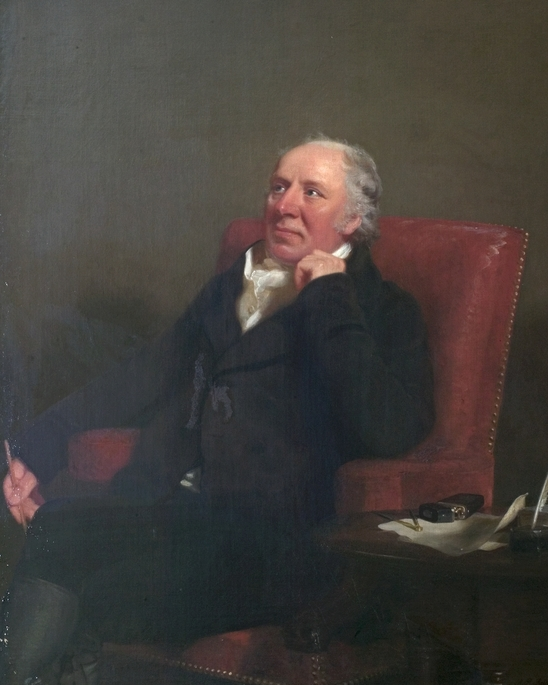
- Richard Arkwright Jr. by George Philip Reinagle
- Born: 19 December 1755; Bolton
- Died: 23 April 1843 (aged 87)
- Children: Richard
- Parent(s): Sir Richard Arkwright, Patience Holt

Richard Arkwright junior (19 December 1755 – 23 April 1843), the son of Sir Richard Arkwright of Cromford in Derbyshire, was a mill owner, turned banker, investor and financier (creditor) of many successful state and private entreprises of the British Industrial Revolution which his father had helped to catalyse. Among his debtors were Samuel Oldknow of Marple and Mellor, his friend. He was one of ten known British millionaires in 1799.

== Biography ==
Richard was born in Bolton. His mother, Patience Holt, died when he was only a few months old, and his father, Sir Richard Arkwright, raised him on his own until he was six, then married Margaret Biggens, with whom he had a daughter, Susan and Mary Anne.

His father patented the water frame, a roller-spinning machine powered by water. This was the patented prototype and archetype of a revolutionary wave of mass-production machines for cloth manufacture. Recognition followed of the economy of scale of bulk, quality textiles among consumers and cloth dealers across the world, and thus from investors in turn, making the spinning (together with combing, weaving and various other required stages) of a modern cotton industry the heart of British manufacturing. Cotton and several other raw textile goods were mass-imported from the British Empire to be worked by the export-heavy zones such as the Lancashire Mill Towns and later processed by the linen, drapery and garment, usually factory-based, industries.

His namesake Richard Arkwright junior followed in his footsteps; by middle age the latter had developed the factory system further. He was an outstanding organiser of labour and machinery processing.

Richard senior died in 1792 leaving much of his wealth to his daughter (born of his second marriage) and his daughter Mary Anne and her grandchildren and various charities, while the rest, including several factories, was left to Richard, already acting manager.

His income streams from the family patent was coupled by well-timed diversification from textiles. In 1799 he was estimated the eight-wealthiest man (or as to others on the list, small aristocratic family unit) in Britain, owning £1M (equivalent to £286,400,000 in 2025). He was one of ten known British millionaires in 1799. He decided to invest in real estate and banks, and began to sell some factories to invest in government securities and real estate. This saved him from bankruptcy when a deep depression, acute in industry, came over Britain, after the defeat of Napoleon.

In 1804 he became a partner in the bank of John Toplis, and when the latter died in 1829, he took its full possession and financed agricultural landlords (richly speculating and pledging security for coal mining and iron ore projects), contractors and governmental plans: like his father, he financed great works in the transportation sector and railways, including the Cromford Canal. At death, his wealth kept ahead of inflation, being over three million pounds (equivalent to £329,556,200,000 in 2025), some decades before having surpassed the late Richard Crawshay as the richest British person from the bourgeoisie (non-aristocracy).

Arkwright was the High Sheriff of Derbyshire in 1801.

== Children ==
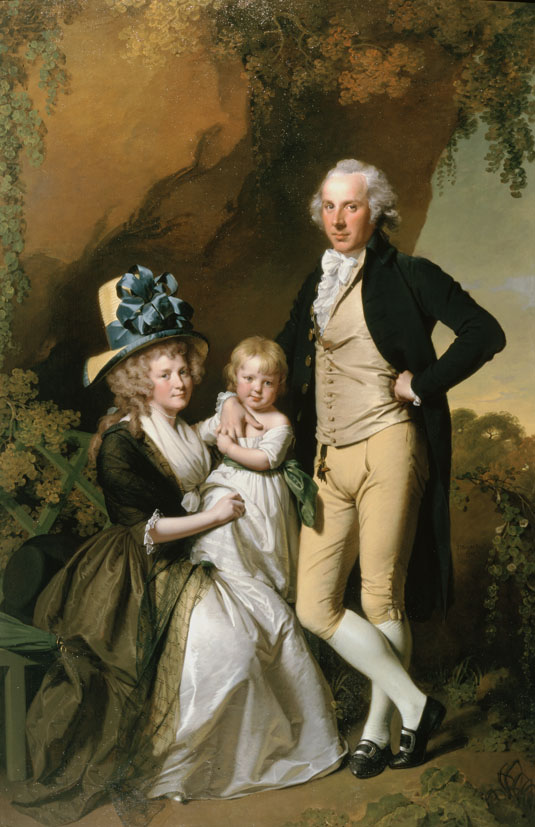
Richard with his daughter, by Joseph Wright

Of his six sons:

- Robert was a commissioned and career army captain, marrying a daughter of theatre manager Stephen Kemble.
- Richard (1781–1832) was co-member of parliament for Rye from 1813 to 1818, and again from 1826 to 1830 in the unreformed House of Commons.

== Portrait ==
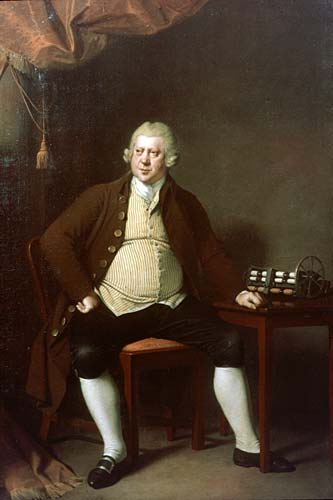
Richard Arkwright senior, by Joseph Wright (1790)

Joseph Wright of Derby painted portraits of the father and son, the latter along with the rest of the family. These two works illustrate the difference in wealth between the two generations. The father is sitting on an ordinary chair, behind his invention, the source of his new social status, whereas the other painting represents Richard junior, with his wife Mary and daughter Anne, all dressed in expensive clothes to the latest fashion with a view of the park of the family estate.

The painting of Richard junior and his family, painted in 1790, was intended as a pendant to Wright's portrait of Sir Richard, and was thought the best of the four paintings which hung in the Arkwright family estate dining room at Willersley Castle. This painting was on loan and in the collection of Derby Museum and Art Gallery, where it was exhibited next to the one representing his father. The painting was sold at Sotheby's on 29 November 2001.

In 2003, the painting was to be moved to the United States but the Derby Museum launched a petition to keep it in its home country. It is a cornerstone to the society. The Arkwright Society, also concerned about the loss of the painting, took an active part in this campaign and the picture eventually remained in England.

Honorary titles
Preceded by Eusebius Horton of Catton Hall	High Sheriff of Derbyshire; 1801–1802	Succeeded by Thomas Prinsep of Croxall Hall
