= Listed buildings in Cromford =

Cromford is a civil parish in the Derbyshire Dales district of Derbyshire, England. The parish contains 97 listed buildings that are recorded in the National Heritage List for England. Of these, ten are listed at Grade I, the highest of the three grades, seven are at Grade II*, the middle grade, and the others are at Grade II, the lowest grade. The parish contains the village of Cromford and the surrounding area. The parish is important because it was here that Richard Arkwright built the first water-powered mill, Cromford Mill, and created the "first industrial community of its type in the world". The first workers' houses were built in North Street, and each has three storeys, the top floor being a workshop. There are listed at Grade II*. Many houses were built later for the workers by Arkwright and his successors, and these had two or three storeys, but no workshop, and each had a standard pattern of two bays, with the doorway in one bay, windows in the other bay, and services at the rear. These are listed at Grade II. Arkwright's original factory and the subsequent associated buildings are listed at Grade I.

The Cromford Canal opened in 1793, ending at Cromford Wharf, near the factory. A number of buildings and structures associated with the canal are listed. The other listed buildings include further houses, cottages and associated structures, farmhouses and farm buildings, a church, a road bridge over the River Derwent, a group of former almshouses, shops, a hotel and a public house, a water wheel, a school and a school house, a pump house, buildings at Cromford railway station, and two war memorials.

== Key ==
Grade	Criteria
I	Buildings of exceptional interest, sometimes considered to be internationally important
II*	Particularly important buildings of more than special interest
II	Buildings of national importance and special interest

== Buildings ==
Name and location	Photograph	Date	Notes	Grade
Cromford Bridge; 53.11099°N 1.55309°W		15th century	The bridge carries Mill Road over the River Derwent. It is in stone and consists of three pointed arches. Attached to the bridge is a fragment of a chapel with a moulded pointed arch.	II*
Cruck barn, Woodseats Farm; 53.11583°N 1.54354°W	—	Late 16th to early 17th century	The barn is in stone with quoins and a Welsh slate roof. There are three bays and a lean-to. The barn contains doorways, casement windows, and a tractor entrance. Insidet here are two full cruck blades.	II
Bridge House; 53.11181°N 1.55249°W		Early 17th century	The house, which was altered and extended in the 18th century, is in stone and has gables with ball finials. There are two storeys and attics, and two wings. The left wing has two blocked entrances, one with a four-centred arch, two-light mullioned windows with casements, and a gabled dormer. The right wing projects, it has two gables, and the windows are sashes.	II*
The Old Cottage; 53.10778°N 1.56209°W		17th century	A house and a cottage, later extended and combined, it is in stone with a roof of Welsh slate and tile. There are two storeys, three bays, and a lower bay on the right. On the front are two doorways, and windows of differing sizes, some of them mullioned.	II
Cromford Almshouses; 53.10482°N 1.56290°W	—	1662	The almshouses are in stone with tile roofs. There is a single storey, and each house has a flat-headed doorway and a two-light mullioned window.	II
Belstone Cottage; 53.10370°N 1.56585°W	—	Late 17th century (possible)	A farmhouse, it was altered in about 1919 and later, and is a private house. It is in stone with a tile roof, two storeys and three bays. The doorway has a large lintel, and the windows are 20th-century casements.	II
171–173 Cromford Hill; 53.10344°N 1.56555°W	—	Late 17th to early 18th century	A farmhouse, later two houses, with alterations. It is in stone with a tile roof, two storeys, three bays, and a lower rendered wing to the right. In the main range are casement windows, the wing contains a mullioned and a sash window, and at the rear are casement windows.	II
Dene Top Cottage; 53.10382°N 1.56545°W	—	Late 17th to early 18th century	The house was much altered and partly rebuilt in the 19th century. It is in stone, partly rendered, with tile roofs and two storeys. On the front facing the road are sash windows with large lintels. The windows in the rear range vary, and include a two-light mullioned window.	II
Bridge, Cromford Mill; 53.10888°N 1.55629°W	—	Early 18th century	The bridge, which spans Bonsall Brook, is in millstone grit. It consists of a single semicircular arch, and is about 7 metres (23 ft) long. The bridge has voussoirs, and splayed parapet walls with curved coping stones.	I
3 Barnwell Lane; 53.10407°N 1.56494°W	—	Mid 18th century	A stone house with a tile roof, two storeys and two bays. The windows have chamfered surrounds, the mullions have been removed from most windows, and a mullioned window has survived at the rear.	II
45 Cromford Hill; 53.10736°N 1.56198°W	—	Mid 18th century	A house, with a shop added in about 1800, on a corner site, in stone, with roofs of tile and slate. The house faces North Street and has two storeys and three bays. On the front is a blocked doorway with a quoined surround, and the windows are a mix of sashes and casements. The shop front facing Cromford Hill has a single storey, and contains a canted bay window and a doorway to the left, over which is a shaped coped gable containing a roundel, and a hipped roof.	II
Two houses, North Street; 53.10733°N 1.56188°W	—	18th century (possible)	The houses are in stone with tile roofs at different heights. The left house was at one time an inn, and has three bays. It contains casement and sash windows, and a blocked doorway with a massive lintel and jamb blocks. The right house originated as a barn or warehouse, it has two bays and the windows are replacements.	II
78 and 80 The Hill; 53.10541°N 1.56468°W		18th century or earlier	A pair of houses at different levels, in stone with tile roofs. There are two storeys and each house has two bays. The windows are mullioned with two lights and contain casements. The doorway of No. 80 has a large rectangular lintel.	II
Building 18, Cromford Mill; 53.10886°N 1.55674°W		1771	The first building on the site, it was extended in the 1780s, and has since been converted for other uses. It is built in millstone grit, it is lined with brick and limestone, and has a roof of asbestos sheeting. There are five storeys and 15 bays. The building has a doorway with a Gibbs surround, the windows are sashes, some with mullions, and there is a surviving section of a cast iron aqueduct.	I
The Shrubbery; 53.10850°N 1.55606°W		c. 1771	Originally the mill manager's house, it is in stone with a slate roof. There are three storeys and three bays. Steps with iron railings and a scrolled lamp bracket lead up to the central doorway that is recessed, and has a segmental head and a fanlight. The windows are sashes.	II
43 Cromford Hill; 53.10743°N 1.56198°W	—	Late 18th century	A stone house on a plinth, with quoins and a tile roof. There are two storeys and three bays. Steps with iron railings lead up to the central doorway that has a glazed canopy. The windows are mullioned with two-lights, and contain casements.	II
114 Cromford Hill; 53.10467°N 1.56540°W	—	Late 18th century	A post office, later a cottage, in gritstone with a tile roof. There is a single storey and two bays. On the front are two doorways, a three-light shop window, a casement window and a post box.	II
1, 2 and 3 Lea Road; 53.10316°N 1.52687°W		Late 18th century	A house and cottage, later divided, it is in stone with quoins and a stone slate roof. There are three storeys and four bays. On the front are two doorways, the windows in the right bay are sashes, and in the other bays they are mullioned casements.	II
20–26 Market Place; 53.10889°N 1.56023°W		Late 18th century	A row of shops in gritstone with a hipped Welsh slate roof. There are three storeys and six bays. In the ground floor are shop fronts, and the upper floors contain sash windows.	II
28–36 Market Place; 53.10885°N 1.56047°W	—	Late 18th century	A terrace of four houses and a shop in gritstone with a hipped roof of Welsh slate and some tile. There are three storeys and five bays. In the ground floor, No. 36 has a shop window, there is a canted bay window with a pitched roof in No. 34, and a flat-roofed bay window in No. 30. Most of the windows are replacement casements.	II
Outbuildings behind 1 North Street; 53.10734°N 1.56156°W	—	Late 18th century	The outbuildings are in gritstone with tile roofs. They form an L-shaped plan, consisting of a two-storey range to the north with a stable door and a loft window, and a lower single storey range to the west containing a double doorway.	II
13 North Street; 53.10683°N 1.56122°W	—	Late 18th century	A stone house with a tile roof, two storeys and three bays. There are two doorways, the upper floor windows are 20th-century casements, and the ground floor windows are enlarged with top-openers.	II
30 and 31 North Street; 53.10721°N 1.56215°W	—	Late 18th century (probable)	A pair of houses in sandstone that have a tile roof with a coped gable on the left. No. 30 has been used as a shop, and No. 31 is part of a public house. There are three storeys, and each house has two bays, with a doorway in one bay, and windows in the other. No. 30 has a square bay window with a hipped roof, and the other windows are sashes, those in the middle floor with cambered heads. At the rear of No. 30 is a small cottage.	II
Old Rectory; 53.10750°N 1.55842°W	—	Late 18th century	A stone house with a hipped slate roof and two storeys. The south front has four bays, and contains a doorway with pilasters, an entablature, and a slight cornice hood. The east front contains a French window and sash windows, all in moulded architraves with cornice hoods. On the right is a projecting wing with a canted bay window, and there is a later recessed wing on the left.	II
Water wheel 53.10907°N 1.56288°W		Late 18th century	The water wheel was built by Richard Arkwright. It is an overshot wheel in iron, and housed between a stone wall and the gabled end of the former machine shop.	II
Buildings 1 and 7 and remains of the Second Mill, Cromford Mill; 53.10923°N 1.55550°W	—	1776	Buildings 1 and 7 were added, probably in the 1780s, as an annex to the Second Mill, which burnt down in 1890. They are in rusticated stone with some brick, and have tile roofs. The remains of the Second Mill consist of gritstone walls between 30 centimetres (12 in) and 2 metres (6 ft 7 in) high. Building 1 has four storeys and is eleven bays long and two bays wide, and Building 7 has a single storey. The windows are sashes with mullions.	I
Rock House; 53.10891°N 1.55428°W	—	1776	The house, later divided into flats, is in stone with a moulded cornice and a parapet. There are three storeys and five bays, and the windows are sashes. To the right is a single-story bay with a Doric portico, and to the left is a three-storey stuccoed wing with four bays. A brick wall links the house to a former stable block, with a sill band, casement windows, a pediment containing a clock face, and a bellcote with a weathervane.	II
The Arkwright Houses; 53.10707°N 1.56172°W		1776–77	A terrace of 16 houses in stone with a moulded eaves cornice, and a tile roof. There are three storeys, and each house has two bays, with a doorway in one bay, and windows in the lower two storeys of the other bay. In the top floor are four-light workshop windows, and in the lower floors the windows are mullioned with two lights. The doorways have substantial rectangular lintels, and crude capitals and bases to the imposts. At the rear of some houses are outshuts.	II*
The Arkwright Houses and unnumbered house 53.10714°N 1.56132°W		1776–77	A terrace of eleven houses in stone with a moulded eaves cornice, and a tile roof. There are three storeys, and each house has two bays, with a doorway in one bay, and most with windows in the lower two storeys of the other bay. In the top floor are four-light workshop windows, and in the lower floors the windows are mullioned with two lights. The doorways have substantial rectangular lintels, and crude capitals and bases to the imposts. The unnumbered house has two-light mullioned windows in both bays and all floors. Behind No. 9 is a former pigsty or privy.	II*
Greyhound Hotel; 53.10866°N 1.56052°W		1778	The hotel is in stone with quoins, a sill band, moulded eaves, and a slate roof with coped gables. There are three storeys and a symmetrical front of five bays, the middle three bays projecting under a pediment containing a clock face. In the centre is a doorway with Roman Doric columns, a semicircular fanlight, a frieze with triglyphs, and a dentilled pediment. The windows are sashes with architraves and keystones.	II*
Building 19, Cromford Mill; 53.10896°N 1.55700°W	—	c. 1780	A residential building, later extended, in red brick with stone dressings and a slate roof. There are two storeys and a double pile plan, with two blocks, and ten bays. The windows are horizontally-sliding sashes, or casements in sash style, with flat arches and voussoirs.	I
Buildings 26 and 21, Cromford Mill; 53.10878°N 1.55709°W	—	c. 1780	The buildings were cottages, probably to provide accommodation for mill workers on call, and have been altered. They are in brick, Building 26 is rendered, and they have slate roofs, and two storeys. Most of the windows are sashes, there is a casement window, and a stair window. The west gable end contains a doorway with a flat arch and voussoirs.	I
Former mill and associated buildings 53.10964°N 1.56475°W		c. 1780	The former mill and other buildings are in gritstone with roofs of tile and slate. The mill has two storeys and three bays, and wheel pits on the gable ends. The cottage has two storeys and attic and an L-shaped plan, and amongst its windows is a Venetian window. Attached to the mill is an ancillary building of two and three storeys, and includes a drying kiln and a malthouse. The boundary wall has an associated overflow spillway, and three control shuttles with metal paddle gates.	II
The Coach House; 53.10848°N 1.55488°W	—	c. 1780	The former coach house to Rock House is in stone, with a sill band, moulded eaves, and a hipped tile roof. There are two storeys and three bays. The central doorway has moulded pilasters, a semicircular fanlight, and a keystone. It is flanked by carriage doorways with pilasters, semicircular heads and keystones, and in the upper floor are lunettes fitted with modern casements.	II
Building 23, Cromford Mill; 53.10905°N 1.55713°W		c. 1785	Originally a loom shop, it was later extended and used for other purposes. It is in millstone grit with roofs of slate and tile. There are three storeys and six bays, and a single-storey range to the northeast. The windows are casements with mullions.	I
Building 17, Cromford Mill; 53.10868°N 1.55647°W	—	1785–90	Originally a cotton spinning mill, it was converted into an office and visitor exhibition in 2014. It is in millstone grit with a hipped slate roof, twelve bays, and an apsidal east end linked to Building 16 by a brick arched bridge. The windows are sashes, and at the west end is a doorway with a Gibbs surround.	I
54–76 Cromford Hill; 53.10551°N 1.56417°W		1780s	A row of eleven houses stepped up a hill, in stone with tile roofs. There are three storeys, and each house has two bays, with a doorway in one bay, and windows in the other. The doorways have substantial rectangular lintels, and crude capitals and bases to the imposts. Most of the windows are mullioned with two lights, and others have been altered.	II
86–94 Cromford Hill; 53.10517°N 1.56504°W	—	1780s	A row of five houses stepped up a hill, in stone with tile roofs. There are three storeys, and each house has two bays, with a doorway in one bay, and windows in the other. The doorways have massive surrounds, two houses have retained the mullions in the windows, and the others have been altered. In front of the houses are low raised pavements.	II
93–101 Cromford Hill; 53.10617°N 1.56278°W	—	1780s	A row of five houses in three steps, in stone with roofs of Welsh slate and corrugated concrete. There are three storeys, and each house has two bays, with a doorway in one bay, and windows in the other. The doorways have substantial rectangular lintels, and crude capitals and bases. Most of the windows are mullioned with two lights, and others have been altered.	II
100–110 Cromford Hill; 53.10493°N 1.56529°W	—	1780s	A row of six gritstone houses, stepped up a hill, with tile roofs. There are three storeys, and each house has two bays, with a doorway in one bay, and windows, initially mullioned, in the other. Some mullions have been removed and later windows inserted.	II
124–128 Cromford Hill; 53.10436°N 1.56538°W		1780s	Three stone houses with tile roofs, No. 128 later. Nos. 124 and 126 have three storeys, No. 128 has two storeys, and each house has two bays, with a doorway in one bay, and windows in the other. The doorways have substantial rectangular lintels, and crude capitals and bases to the imposts. Most of the windows are mullioned with two lights, and others have been altered.	II
132–136 Cromford Hill; 53.10416°N 1.56549°W	—	1780s	A terrace of three stone houses with tile roofs and three storeys. Each house has two bays, with a doorway in one bay, and windows in the other. The doorways have substantial large lintels, and crude capitals and bases to the imposts. The windows are mullioned with two lights, and there is an inserted window in No. 132.	II
33–43 Market Place; 53.10814°N 1.56074°W		1780s	A row of five houses, later shops, in stone with tile roofs. There are three storeys, No. 43, which was added later, has one bay, and the other shops each has two bays. In the ground floor are various shop fronts, and most of the windows in the upper floors are mullioned with two lights, and some have been altered.	II
Buildings 8, 9 and 10, and wall, Cromford Mill; 53.10912°N 1.55508°W	—	1780s	The buildings were originally a stable block, a coach house and a warehouse, and were converted for other uses in the 20th century. The buildings are in stone with slate roofs. Buildings 8 and 9 have some alterations in brick and concrete breeze block, a single storey with an attic at the northeast, and a rectangular plan. The windows are casements, and there is a semicircular archway containing glazing and double doors. Building 10 has three storeys, five bays, a hipped roof, and a mix of sash and casement windows. The perimeter wall at the east end is mainly in millstone grit, with some limestone.	I
Buildings 14, 15 and 16, and bridge link, Cromford Mill; 53.10876°N 1.55569°W		1780s	The buildings originated as offices, a workshop and a warehouse, with an attached arched link building, all later converted for other uses. They are in millstone grit with hipped slate roofs, and have three storeys, a total of 20 bays, and an apse at the west end. Attached to the apse is a link to Building 22 in red brick, consisting of a narrow segmental arch. Most of the windows are sashes and there are also casement windows.	I
Conduit; 53.10781°N 1.56080°W		1780s (probable)	The conduit behind Nos. 3–13 Cromford Hill has stone sides and a cutwater to the channels, with retaining walls, and a sluice at one end.	II
Willersley Castle; 53.11142°N 1.55853°W		1787–92	A country house for Richard Arkwright, who died before it was completed. It has since been used for other purposes, and was at one time a hotel. The house is built in stone with string courses and embattled parapets. There is a main block of three storeys and seven bays, lower side wings, and a porch on the east side. The middle bay of the main front is flanked by semicircular turrets, and there are smaller turrets at the angles of the wings. The windows are sashes.	II*
The Bell Inn; 53.10724°N 1.56226°W		Late 1780s (probable)	The public house was partly rebuilt in about 1800. The original part is in stone, the rebuilt part is in red brick on a stone plinth, and the roof is tiled and hipped on the left. There are three storeys and the windows are a mix of sashes and casements.	II
Village lock-up 53.10768°N 1.56116°W	—	1790	The lock-up with keeper's accommodation above, later used for other purposes, is in stone with a slate roof. There are two storeys and five bays. On the front are two doorways with large square lintels, and the windows are mullioned.	II
9–13 Barnwell Lane; 53.10412°N 1.56416°W	—	1780s or 1790s	A row of three houses in stone with a tile roof. There are three storeys and each house has two bays, with a doorway in one bay, and windows in the other. The doorways have large lintels, and crude capitals and bases to the imposts. The windows are casements, and on the front is a porch. At the rear is a two-storey lean-to and a gabled dormer.	II
130 Cromford Hill; 53.10432°N 1.56569°W	—	1780s or 1790s	A stone house with a tile roof, set back from the road, and with gable entry facing the road. There are two storeys, and the house contains a doorway with a substantial rectangular lintel, and crude capitals and bases to the imposts. The windows are mullioned with two lights.	II
142–148 Cromford Hill; 53.10381°N 1.56577°W	—	1780s or 1790s	A row of four houses in two steps up a hill, in stone, with tile roofs and three storeys. Each house has two bays, with a doorway in one bay, and windows in the other. The doorways have large lintels, and crude capitals and bases to the imposts. Some of the windows are mullioned with two lights, and others have been altered.	II
Gate piers and gates, Willersley Castle; 53.11143°N 1.55346°W		c. 1792	At the entrance to the drive are two pairs of gate piers flanking the vehicular road and the pedestrian paths. They are in rusticated stone, and each pier has a moulded cornice cap with a fluted frieze. The gates are in wrought iron.	II
Lodge, Willersley Castle; 53.11156°N 1.55362°W		c. 1792	The lodge by the entrance to the grounds is in stone with a belt course, a cornice, and a parapet raised at the sides. There are two storeys and one bay with a recessed arch containing a doorway with side lights and a sash window above. In the upper floor are blank quatrefoils, and over the doorway is a bracketed cast iron lantern.	II
St Mary's Church; 53.11045°N 1.55383°W		1792–97	The church was remodelled in 1858–59, with the addition of a porch and a chancel, and it was restored in 1897–98. It is built in freestone and gritstone, and has a corrugated stainless steel roof. The church consists of a nave, a chancel with a polygonal apse, a west tower and a porch, and is in Perpendicular style. The porch is open, and has three pointed arches with linked hoods, and diagonal buttresses. The tower has three stages, and contains a window with a trefoil head, above which is a clock face in a lozenge panel, two-light bell openings, and an embattled parapet with pinnacles. It is flanked by lower stair turrets containing three-light windows. On the body of the church are embattled parapets on moulded cornices., and inside is a complete scheme of wall paintings.	I
Counting House, Cromford Wharf; 53.10957°N 1.55410°W		1794	The counting house, which was later extended, is in sandstone with a Welsh slate roof. There are two storeys and a polygonal plan. At the front is a splayed gable, a doorway with a fanlight, and two doors. In the right return, facing the canal, is a two-light mullioned window.	II
Northeast boundary walls, Cromford Wharf; 53.10987°N 1.55395°W	—	c. 1794	The wall is in gritstone with half-round coping. It is about 1.5 metres (4 ft 11 in) high, and runs along Mill Road for about 100 metres (330 ft), then east for about 75 metres (246 ft), including a doorway. At the southwest end, the wall ramps up, and there is a pair of square tapering gate piers, and at the northeast end is a single pier.	II
Northwest boundary walls, Cromford Wharf; 53.10983°N 1.55260°W	—	c. 1794	The wall is in drystone, it is coped, and about 2 metres (6 ft 7 in) high. It runs southeast for about 200 metres (660 ft) and contains two doors and a gate, then south for about 100 metres (330 ft), and southeast for about 40 metres (130 ft).	II
Northern retaining wall with loading bays, Cromford Wharf; 53.10971°N 1.55347°W	—	1794	The wall is in gritstone, and it curves twice to form loading bays, one with a set of steps.	II
Northern Warehouse, Cromford Wharf; 53.10977°N 1.55375°W		1794	The warehouse is in sandstone and has a Welsh slate roof, hipped at the rear. There are two storeys and a half-basement, a front of one bay, and five bays along the sides. On the front is a doorway with a wedge lintel and a window, and above them the wall rises to form an embattled parapet. Along the sides are loading doors and windows, and on the right return is a canopy added in 1814 that straddles the canal dock.	II
1–13 Cromford Hill and buildings to rear 53.10792°N 1.56112°W	—	1790s (probable)	A row of houses, some converted into shops, in rendered stone, with a moulded eaves cornice and tile roofs. There are three storeys, and each house has two bays, with a doorway in one bay, and windows in the other. Nos. 3–7 have shop windows in the ground floor, and the other windows have cambered heads, most with small panes. There are added structures to the rear of Nos. 3–7.	II
21 and 23 Cromford Hill; 53.10779°N 1.56134°W	—	1790s (probable)	A pair of stone houses on a plinth, No. 21 rendered, with a moulded eaves cornice. No. 21 has a slab roof and No. 23 a Welsh slate roof. There are three storeys, and each house has two bays, with a doorway in one bay, and windows in the other, and No. 23 has a lean-to on the right. The doorways have large lintels, and the windows have been altered, those in No. 23 with cambered arches.	II
25–39 Cromford Hill; 53.10760°N 1.56158°W	—	1790s (probable)	A row of eight houses stepped in pairs on a plinth, in rendered stone, with a moulded eaves cornice, and Welsh slate roofs. There are three storeys, and each house has two bays, with a doorway in one bay, and windows in the other. Some windows are sashes and others are casements, all with cambered heads. At the end of the garden are two sets of privies.	II
Fishing Pavilion; 53.11076°N 1.55290°W		1796	The building, near Cromford Bridge, is in stone with coved eaves and a pyramidal stone-tile roof. There are two storeys and a square plan. The windows are sashes in moulded architraves, and the doorway has a moulded architrave and a slight cornice with an inscription.	II
Wharf Cottage, Cromford Wharf; 53.10991°N 1.55322°W		c. 1796	The cottage, which was later extended and divided into two cottages, is in sandstone, with some red brick in the extension, and a Welsh slate roof, hipped at the front. Thee are two storeys and three bays at the front, a single-storey wing at the rear right, and a later two-storey wing at the rear left. The left cottage has sash windows, and the windows in the right cottage are casements.	II
Home Farmhouse; 53.11183°N 1.55397°W		c. 1800	The farmhouse in the grounds of Willersley Castle is stone with false quoins and a tile roof. There are three storeys and three bays. The central doorway is recessed and has a freestone surround, a fluted keystone, and a moulded cornice. The windows are sashes in architraves, the central window in the middle floor with Gothic glazing.	II
Former barns 53.10680°N 1.56205°W	—	Late 18th or early 19th century	Two barns, later used for other purposes, they are in stone, and have different roof levels. The right building has a tile roof, and contains a doorway and a blocked three-light mullioned window, and the left building has a corrugated iron roof, and a doorway with a lintel.	II
Structure south west of The Cottage and Weaver Cottage; 53.10679°N 1.56180°W	—	Late 18th or early 19th century	A building of uncertain purposes, it is in stone and as a stone slab roof. There is a square plan, and it has a single opening.	II
Side walls, curbs and feeder channel, Cromford Canal Basin; 53.10951°N 1.55312°W		c.1820	The canal basin has a stone edging with iron rings, and this runs for about 200 metres (660 ft) along the north side, it funnels into a narrow dock adjacent to the northern warehouse, then lines the south side of the basin, and turns south along the line of Mill Road. The basin is fed by a culvert, and the feeder channel was added to increase the flow.	II
Southern Warehouse, Cromford Wharf; 53.10953°N 1.55383°W		1823	The warehouse is in sandstone with a Welsh slate roof, two storeys, and fronts of one and three bays. In the north front are doorways and windows, all with massive lintels, and the doorway in the upper floor has a balcony. On the front facing the canal is a central doorway flanked by windows, and a slate-hung cantilevered projection.	II
30 Bedehouse Lane; 53.10464°N 1.56295°W	—	Early 19th century (probable)	Four cottages, later combined into a single dwelling, it is in stone with a stone slab roof. There are two storeys, and each house has two bays, with a doorway in one bay, and windows in the other. The doorways have massive lintels, in the ground floor are two-light mullioned windows, and the upper floor contains single-light windows.	II
36 and 38 Bedehouse Lane and outbuilding 53.10438°N 1.56294°W	—	Early 19th century (probable)	A pair of stone houses with a stone slab roof and two storeys. Each house has two bays, with a doorway in one bay, and windows in the other. The doorways have large lintels, and the windows are casements with cambered heads. To the right is a former outbuilding, recessed and lower, with two storeys. It contains two blocked windows with the surrounds and mullions retained, and an inserted door and window.	II
41 Bedehouse Lane; 53.10423°N 1.56254°W	—	Early 19th century (probable)	Two houses, later combined into a single dwelling, it is in stone with a stone slab roof. There are two storeys, and each former house has two bays, with a doorway in one bay, and windows in the other. In the ground floor are two-light mullioned windows, and the upper floor contains single-light windows. A casement window has been inserted in the former right doorway.	II
43 Bedehouse Lane; 53.10423°N 1.56271°W	—	Early 19th century (probable)	Two houses, later combined into a single dwelling, it is in stone with a stone slab roof. There are two storeys, and each former house has two bays, with a doorway in one bay, and windows in the other. In the ground floor are two-light mullioned windows, and the upper floor contains single-light windows. A casement window has been inserted in the former right doorway.	II
20–24 Cromford Hill; 53.10758°N 1.56253°W	—	Early 19th century	A row of four, later three, cottages in stone with Welsh slate roofs. There are two storeys and overall six bays. On the front are three doorways, and the windows are sashes.	II
46–52 Cromford Hill; 53.10576°N 1.56372°W	—	Early 19th century	A row of four stone houses with a roof mainly of Welsh slate. There are two storeys and each house has two bays, with a doorway in one bay, and windows in the other. The doorways have large lintels, and the windows have cambered arched heads.	II
82 and 84 Cromford Hill; 53.10533°N 1.56484°W	—	Early 19th century	A pair of stone houses with a tile roof There are two storeys and attics, and each house has two bays, with a doorway in one bay, and windows in the other. The windows have two lights, those in the attics are mullioned, and above each window is a small gable.	II
Outbuilding behind 112–114 Cromford Hill; 53.10467°N 1.56567°W	—	Early 19th century	The outbuilding is in stone with a tile roof in two levels. It contains large double doors on the front, and a smaller doorway with a large lintel to the right. The rear wall is plain.	II
138 Cromford Hill; 53.10413°N 1.56567°W	—	Early 19th century	A stone house with a hipped Welsh slate roof, two storeys, a double depth plan, and a symmetrical front of three bays. In the centre is a doorway, above which is a blocked round-headed window. The outer bays contain sash windows with large lintels.	II
Outbuilding behind 138 Cromford Hill; 53.10408°N 1.56599°W	—	Early 19th century	The outbuilding is in stone with large quoins, a tile roof in two levels, and a single storey. On the front is a doorway, and at the rear are more doorways, and windows with large lintels.	II
30–46 Water Lane; 53.10983°N 1.56421°W		Early 19th century	A terrace of nine stone houses with a tile roof. They have three storeys and each house has two bays, with a doorway in one bay, and windows in the other. Above some doorways are gabled wooden canopies on brackets, and the windows are mullioned with two lights.	II
The Back Shop; 53.10713°N 1.56221°W	—	Early 19th century	A former shop in sandstone with a tile roof and two storeys. It contains a doorway, and a casement window with quoined jambs, and both have a dressed lintel.	II
The Cottage and Weaver Cottage; 53.10691°N 1.56148°W	—	Early 19th century (probable)	Two houses forming parallel ranges to the rear of North Street. They are in stone and have tile roofs with coped gables. The houses contain mullioned windows, later windows, and doorways with large lintels.	II
The Agent's House and The Loco; 53.09991°N 1.53382°W	—	c. 1826	A pair of stone houses with a hipped slate roof. There are two storeys and basements, and each house has two bays. The doorways in the outer bays have round heads and semicircular fanlights, and the windows are sashes. The bridged entranceways and the steps down to the basements are flanked by wrought iron railings.	II
116–122 Cromford Hill; 53.10450°N 1.56544°W	—	1830 (probable)	A row of four houses in two steps up a hill, in stone with Welsh slate roofs. There are two storeys, and each house has two bays, with a doorway in one bay, and windows, most of which are casements, in the other. At the rear are two gabled wings.	II
Church of England School; 53.10680°N 1.56056°W		1832	The school, which was enlarged in 1893, is in stone with moulded eaves and hipped slate roofs. It consists of two single-storey ranges at right angles. Each range contains semicircular-headed windows and a doorway, that in the north range with a semicircular head and a fanlight.	II
School House; 53.10673°N 1.56079°W	—	1832	The house in the grounds of the school is in stone with a hipped slate roof. There are two storeys and two bays, and the windows are sashes.	II
49–69 Cromford Hill and attached building 53.10692°N 1.56237°W	—	1830s (probable)	A row of eleven stone houses with roofs of Welsh slate and corrugated concrete. There are two storeys, and each house has two bays, with a doorway in one bay, and windows in the other. The doorways have massive lintels, and most of the windows have cambered heads. Attached to No. 49 is a building with two doorways to the street, and loft access and a doorway in the end wall. At the ends of the gardens are two privy blocks.	II
73–91 Cromford Hill; 53.10650°N 1.56256°W	—	1830s	A row of ten houses stepped up a hill, in stone with roofs of Welsh slate, tile, and corrugated concrete. There are two storeys, and each house has two bays, with a doorway in one bay, and windows in the other. The doorways have large lintels, and the windows have cambered heads.	II
Alison House; 53.10684°N 1.55854°W	—	1840s	Built as a dower house for The Rectory, it is in stone with a band and a hipped slate roof. There are two storeys and fronts of three and four bays. The doorway has pilasters, an entablature and a slight cornice hood, and the windows are sashes.	II
High Peak Pump House; 53.09746°N 1.53057°W		1849	The pump house is in rusticated stone with quoins and slate roofs. The main building has two storeys and three bays, the ends are pedimented, and each contains a doorway with moulded pilasters and a cornice hood. Above is a round-headed window with voussoirs, a stepped frieze, and a blocking course. The boiler house on the side is lower, with a single storey, two bays, and pedimented ends containing two round-arched entrances. Between them at the rear is a tall tapering octagonal chimney with bands and a cast iron cap on a square base.	II*
East platform building, Cromford railway station 53.11281°N 1.54878°W		c. 1855	The waiting room, later used for other purposes, is in the style of a French château. It is in stone, with a modillion eaves cornice, and a steep hipped slate roof. There is a single storey and four bays. In the centre is a round-headed doorway, above which is a circular clock face under a small gable, and a pointed hipped turret.	II
Station master's house, Cromford railway station 53.11301°N 1.54883°W	—	1860	The house is in stone, with a modillion eaves cornice, and a steep hipped slate roof, and it is in the style of a French château. There are two storeys and a rear wing. The house contains three-light mullioned windows with hood moulds extending overall as bands, and there are two dormers.	II
Main building, Cromford railway station 53.11291°N 1.54926°W		c. 1874	The building is in stone with a moulded eaves cornice and a hipped slate roof. There is a single storey and eleven bays, the central bays slightly raised. The doorway has a hood on ornate pierced cast iron brackets, and the windows are sashes with chamfered architraves.	II
Footbridge, Cromford railway station 53.11283°N 1.54896°W		1885	The footbridge is in iron, and consists of an elliptical arch with stone steps at each end. The bridge has lattice parapets with ornamental scroll supports.	II
Cromford War Memorial; 53.10888°N 1.55919°W		1919	The war memorial stands in a Garden of Remembrance, and consists of a canopied Crucifixion on an octagonal shaft, on a rectangular pedestal. These are all in Stancliffe stone, and they stand on a base of three limestone steps. On the pedestal and top step are bronze plaques with inscriptions and the names of those lost in the two World Wars. The memorial is surrounded by a paved area.	II
Scarthin War Memorial; 53.10910°N 1.56148°W		1920	The war memorial on the Promenade is in Hopton Wood stone. It consists of a square pillar with a stepped and chamfered base and a corniced cap, surmounted by a small pedestal and a lamp standard. On the pillar are inscriptions and the names of those lost in the two World Wars. The memorial is enclosed by low metal railings.	II
