= Cromford War Memorial =

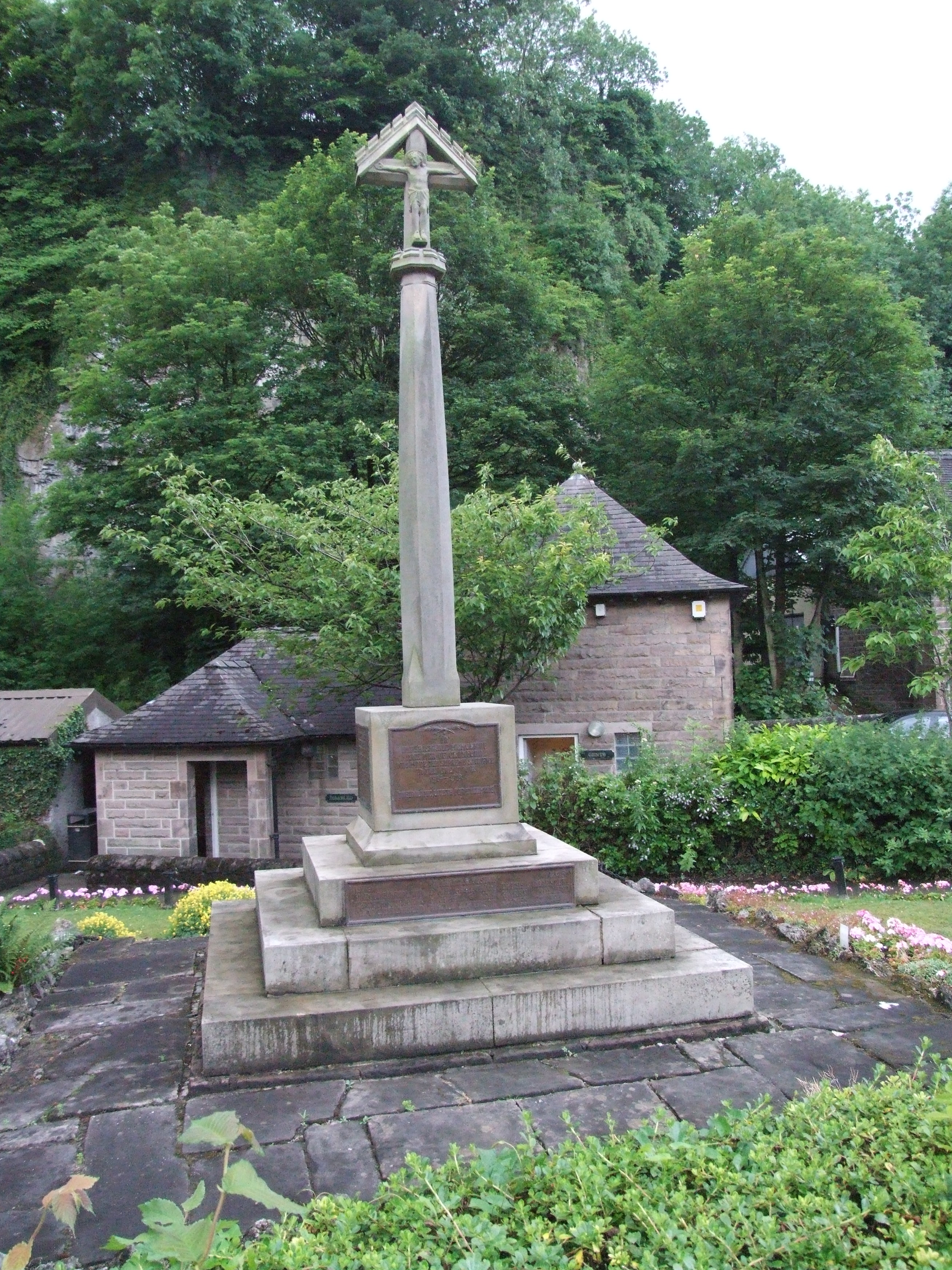
- Cromford War Memorial

- Location in Derbyshire
- 53°06′32″N 1°33′33″W
- Location: Cromford, Derbyshire, England

Listed Building – Grade II
- Official name: War Memorial
- Designated: 6 July 2016
- Reference no.: 1436081

Cromford War Memorial is a 20th-century grade II listed war memorial in Cromford, Derbyshire.

== Description ==
The war memorial stands in a Garden of Remembrance and consists of a canopied Crucifixion on an octagonal shaft, on a rectangular pedestal. These are all in Stancliffe stone, and they stand on a base of three limestone steps. On the pedestal and top step are bronze plaques with inscriptions and the names of those lost in the two World Wars.

The memorial has been Grade II listed since 6 July 2016.

== See also ==
- Listed buildings in Cromford
