= Cromford Mills =

Grade I listed mill in Derbyshire, England

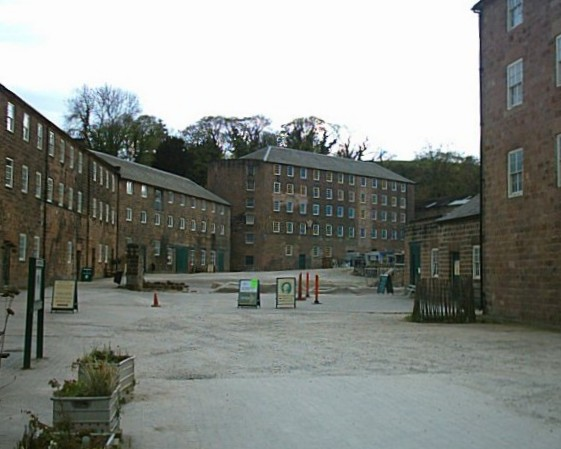
- Cromford Mills

- Location within Derbyshire

Spinning Mill (Water frame)
- Structural system: Stone
- Location: Cromford, Derbyshire
- Owner: Arkwright
- Coordinates: 53.1090°N 1.5560°W

Construction
- Built: 1772; 254 years ago
- Employees: 200
- Floor count: 5

Equipment

Listed Building – Grade I
- Official name: Building 18 at Cromford Mill
- Designated: 22 June 1950
- Reference no.: 1248010

Cromford Mills is the world's first cotton spinning mill powered by water, which was established in 1771 by Richard Arkwright at Cromford, Derbyshire, England.

The mill structure is classified as a Grade I listed building. With a multi-use visitor centre having shops, galleries, restaurants and cafes, it is the centrepiece of the wider area known as Derwent Valley Mills, a UNESCO World Heritage Site stretching along the Upper Derwent Valley.

The earliest building, known as Upper Mill or Building 18, was removed from Historic England's Heritage at Risk Register in November 2026 after lengthy remedial work to improve structural stability and weatherproofing.

== History ==
Following the invention of the flying shuttle for weaving cotton in 1733, the demand for spun cotton increased enormously in England. Machines for carding and spinning had already been developed but were inefficient. Spun cotton was also produced by means of the spinning jenny but was insufficiently strong to form the warp of a fabric, for which it was the practice to use linen thread, producing a type of cloth known as fustian. In 1769, Richard Arkwright patented a water frame to use the extra power of a water mill after he had set up a horse-powered mill in Nottingham.

He chose the site at Cromford because it had year-round supply of water from the Cromford Sough which drained water from nearby lead mines at Wirksworth, together with Bonsall Brook. Here he built a five-storey mill, with the backing of Jedediah Strutt (whom he met in a Nottingham bank via Ichabod Wright), Samuel Need and John Smalley. Starting in 1772, he ran the mills day and night with two twelve-hour shifts.

He started with 200 workers, more than the locality could provide, so he built housing for them nearby, one of the first manufacturers to do so. Most of the employees were women and children, the youngest being only seven years old. Later, the minimum age was raised to ten and the children were given six hours of education a week, so that they could do the record-keeping that their illiterate parents could not.

A large part of the village was built to house the mill workers. Stuart Fisher states that these are now considered to be "the first factory housing development in the world". Employees were provided with shops, pubs, chapels and a school.

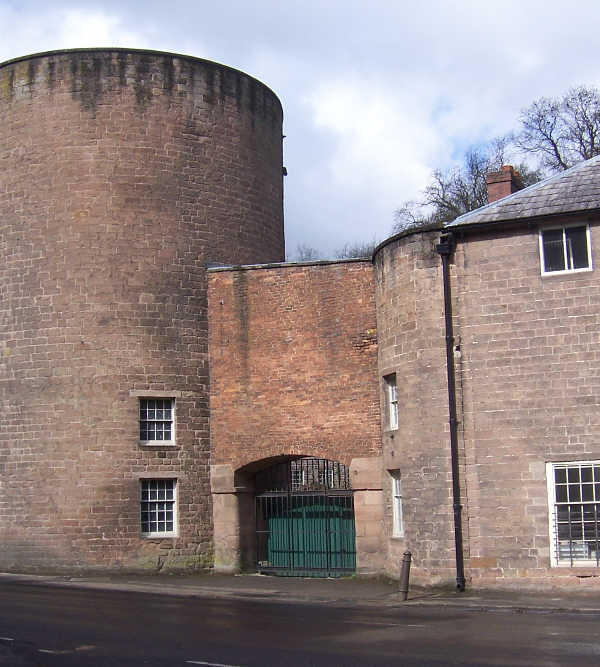
Gateway to Arkwright's Mill

The gate to Cromford Mills was shut at precisely 6 am and 6 pm every day, and any worker who failed to get through it not only lost a day's pay but also was fined another day's pay.

=== Cromford dollars ===
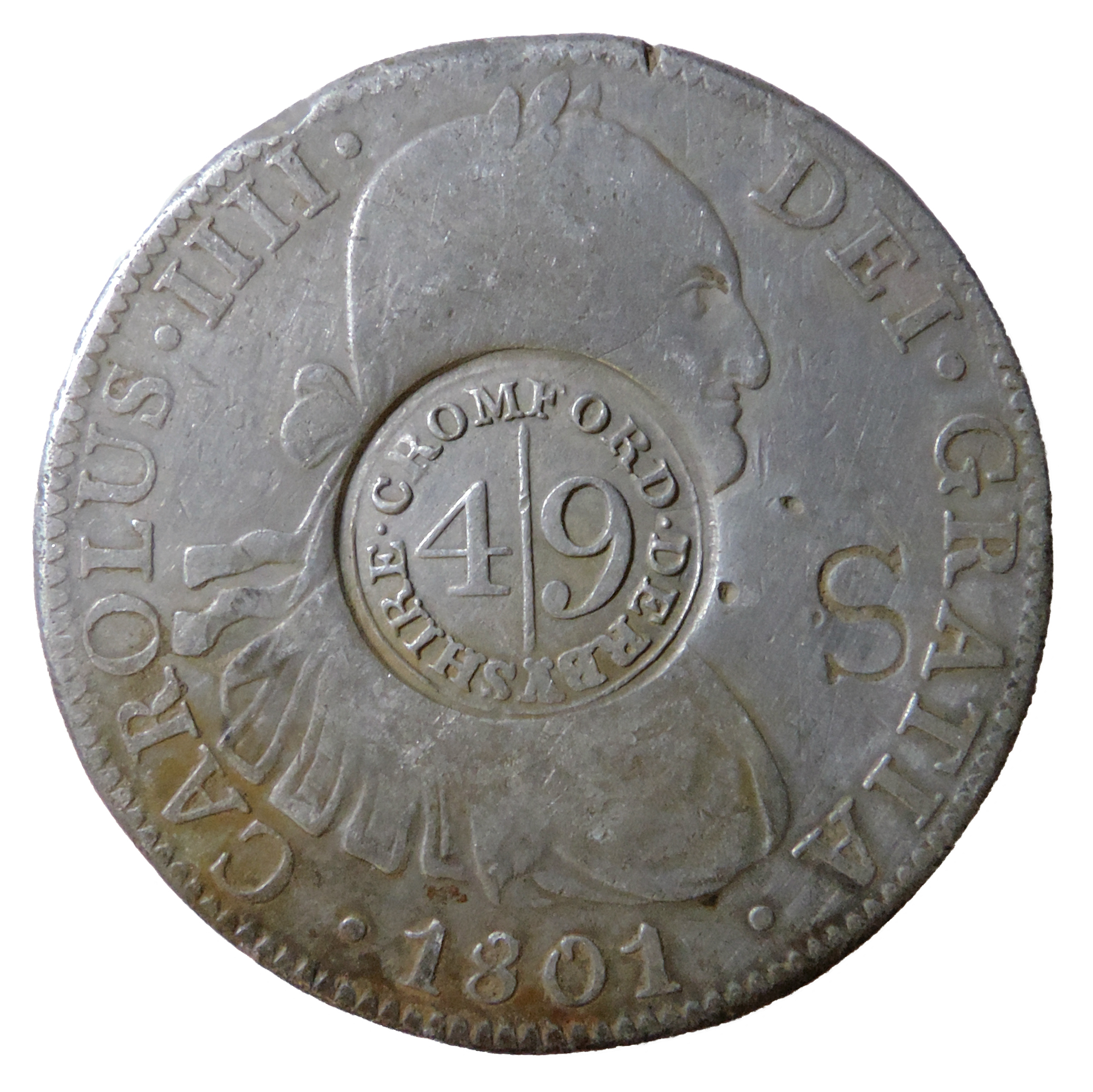
A "Cromford dollar". The figures "4|9" show a value of 4 shillings and 9 pence

In 1801 and 1802, during a national shortage of silver, Spanish real coins were overstamped for use as coinage at Cromford.

=== Closure and further use ===
The cotton mill ceased operation in the 19th century and the buildings were used for other purposes, finally a dyeing plant. In 1979, the Grade I listed site was bought by the Arkwright Society, who began the long task of restoring it to its original state.

The importance of this site is not that it was the first but that it was the first successful cotton spinning factory. It showed unequivocally the way ahead and was widely emulated.

=== World Heritage Site ===
The Cromford Mills complex, owned and being restored by the Arkwright Society, was declared by Historic England as "one of the country’s 100 irreplaceable sites". In 2018, the "Cromford Mills Creative Cluster and World Heritage Site Gateway Project" was listed as a finalist for the "Best Major Regeneration of a Historic Building or Place" in the Historic England Angel Awards.

In 2019, the Arkwright Society employed 100 people; by that time, the restoration expenditure had reached £48 million.

The mill and other buildings are open to the public every day, and has attracted visitors from all over the world. Facilities include a visitors' centre, shops and a café.

The earliest building, originally conceived by Richard Arkwright and known as Upper Mill or Building 18, has undergone a series of works to improve structural stability, weatherproofing and drainage. Funded by the Pilgrim Trust, the Hedley Foundation and Historic England, with an additional grant provided by the National Heritage Lottery Fund, the building, on Historic England's Heritage at Risk Register from its inception in 1999, was removed from the register in November 2026.

In 2024 the site was used as a venue for BBC One's Antiques Roadshow.

The nearby Cromford Canal towpath to High Peak Junction, and onwards towards Ambergate, is listed as a Biological Site of Special Scientific Interest (SSSI).

=== Restoration ===
==== Condition in 1995 ====
The 1771 building had been reduced by two storeys in 1929. Access was forbidden due to the toxic residue from the 20th-century paintmaking usage; the later tank with its toxic sediment obscured the foundations of the 1775 mill and the breast-shot waterwheel chamber. Only one remaining mill building was usable and suitable for guided tours.

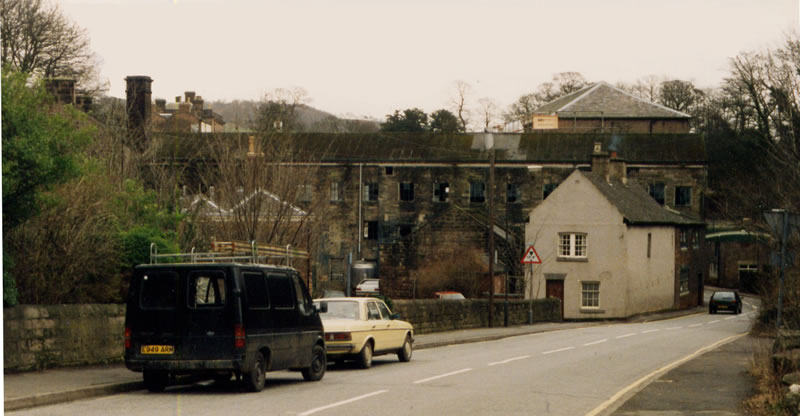
The original 1771 mill seen on the approach along Mill Road from the village

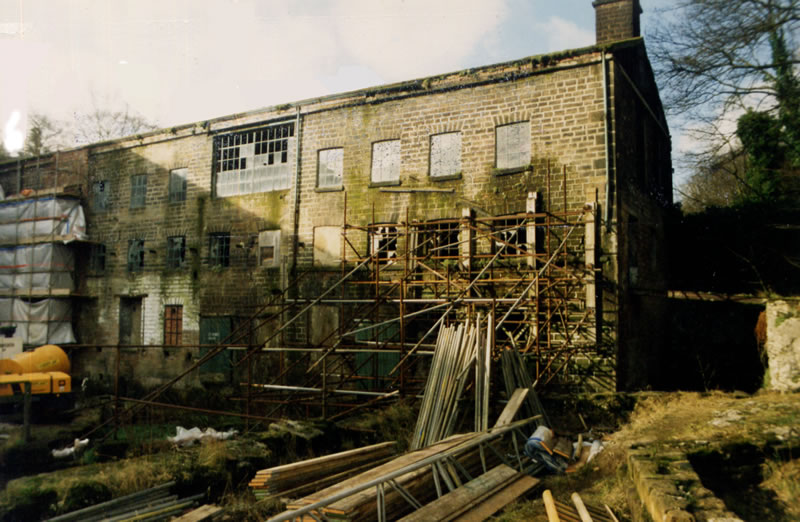
The first mill viewed from the yard in 1995

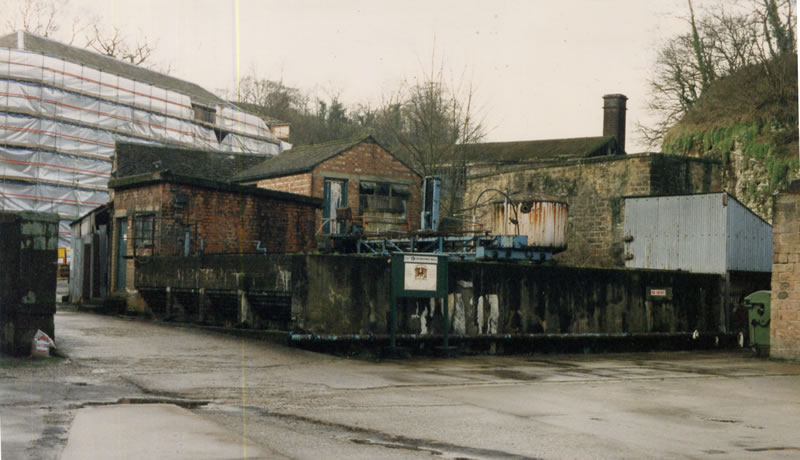
The tank over the waterwheel chamber

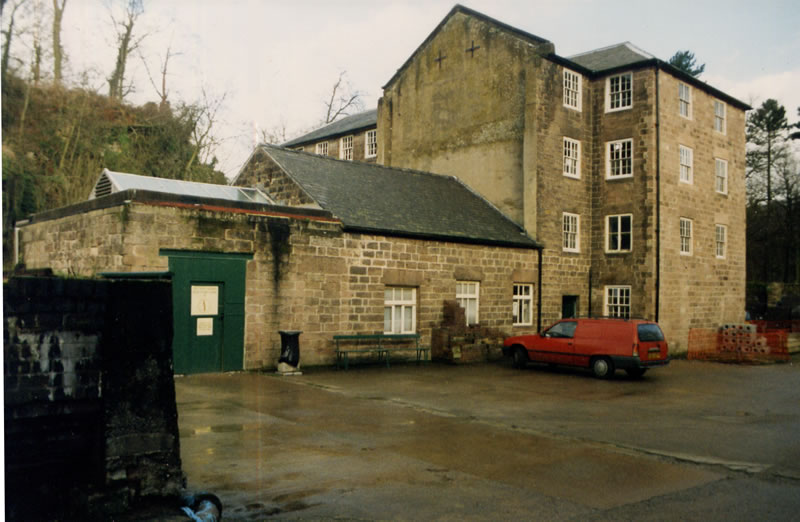
The usable mill building undergoing work to replace many stone lintels and reinstate the original Georgian windows

==== Restoration in progress 2009 ====
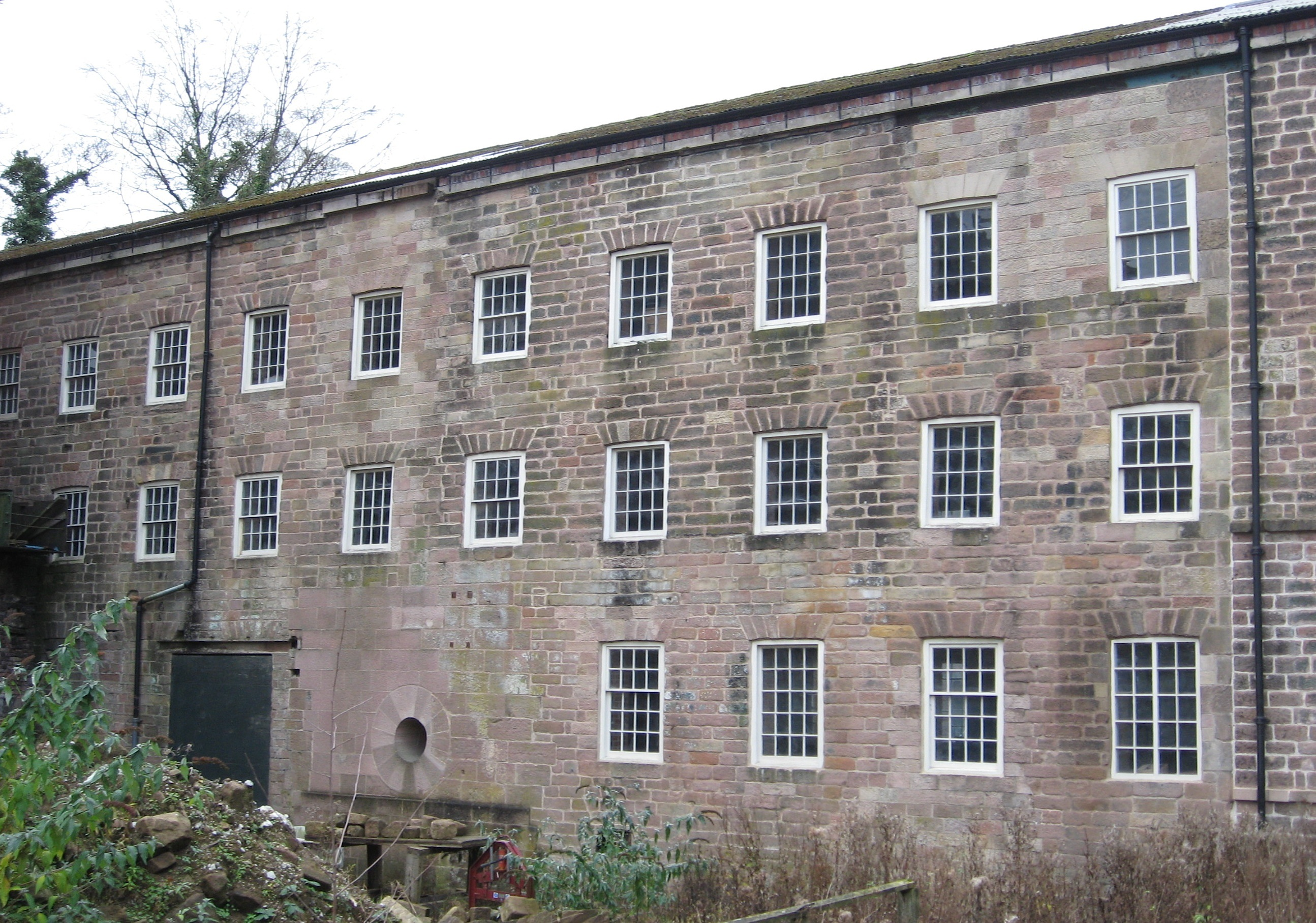
Existing three of five storeys showing the extent of the original mill. Initially there was an undershot waterwheel to the right outside of the picture.

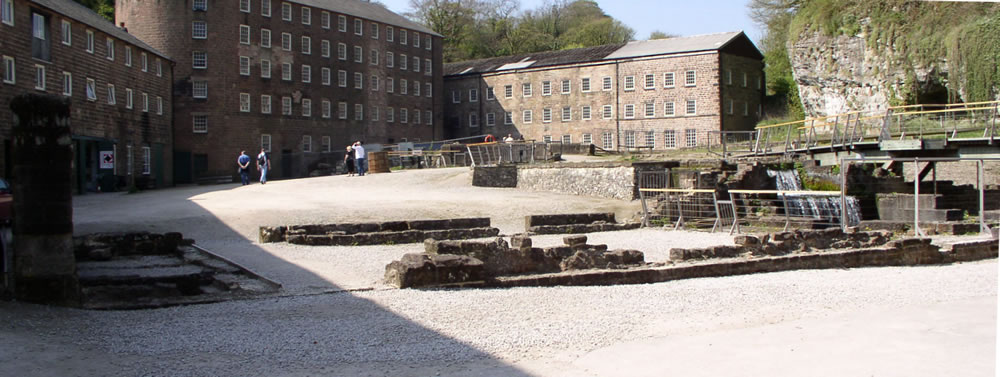
The foundations of the 1775 mill, which was destroyed by fire in 1890, with wheel chamber on the right

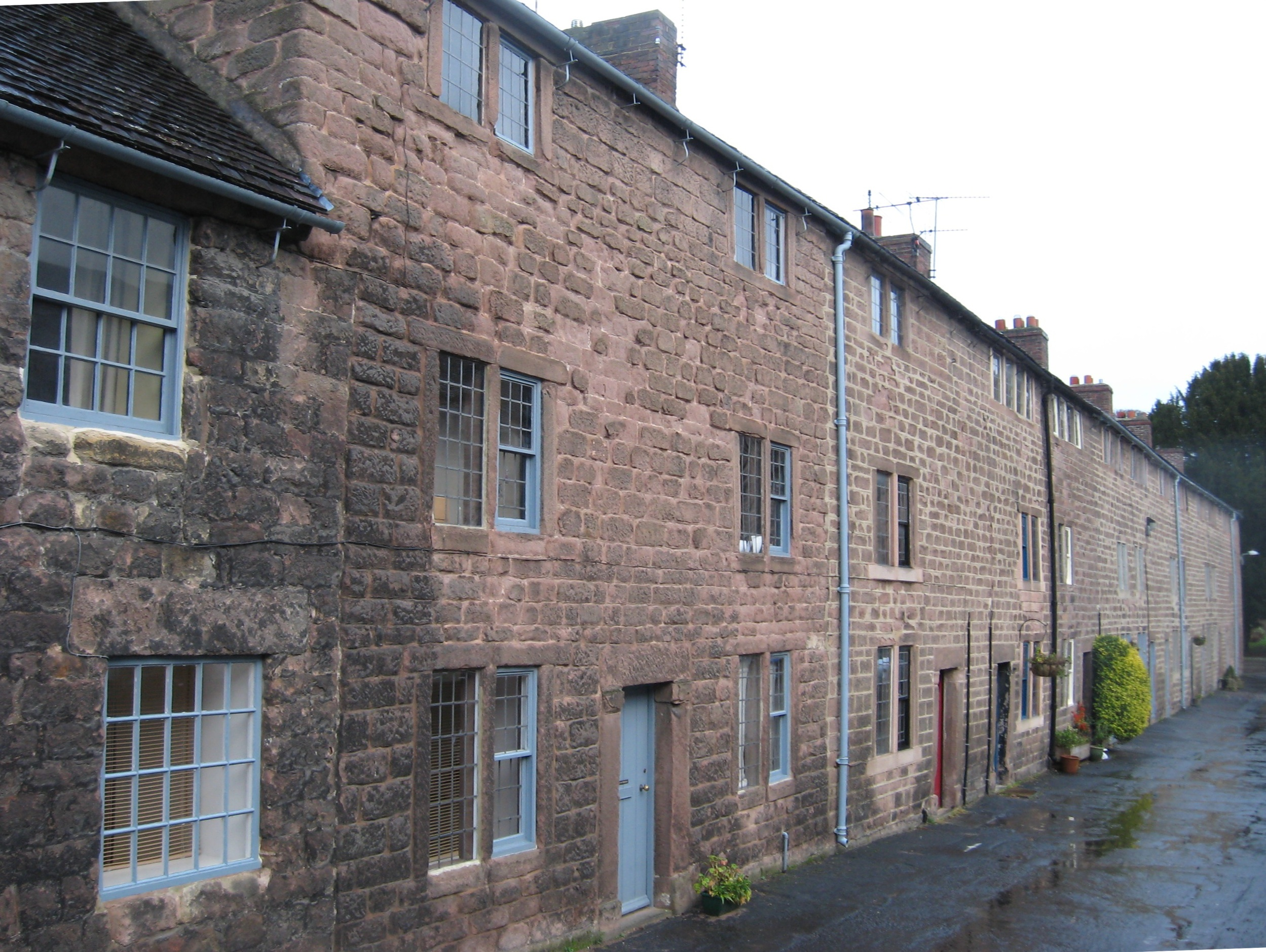
Weavers' housing, North Street, Cromford

==== Restoration of hydropower capacity ====
Installation of a water wheel, accompanied by a modern 20 kW hydro-turbine to power the buildings, was approved in 2022.

== Buildings and structures ==
=== 1771 mill ===
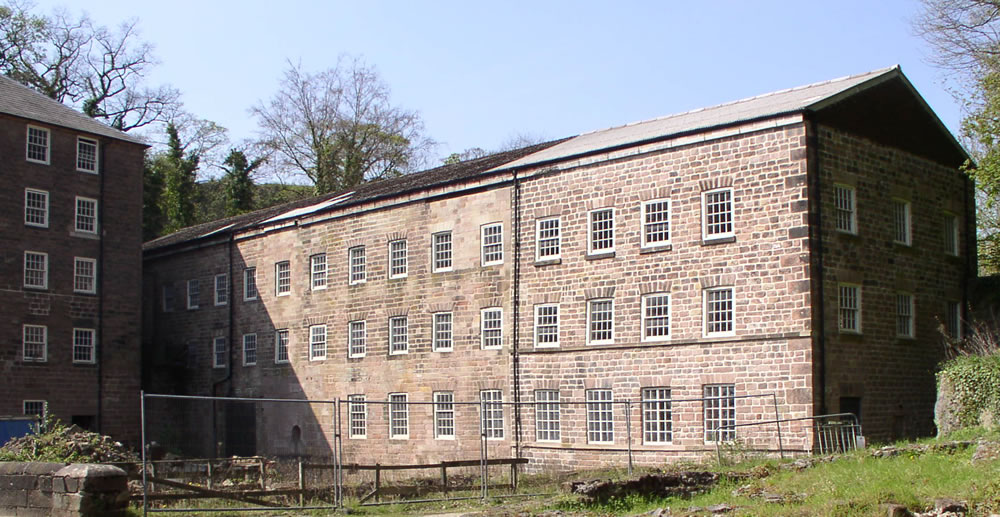
The remaining three storeys of the first mill

=== 1775 mill ===
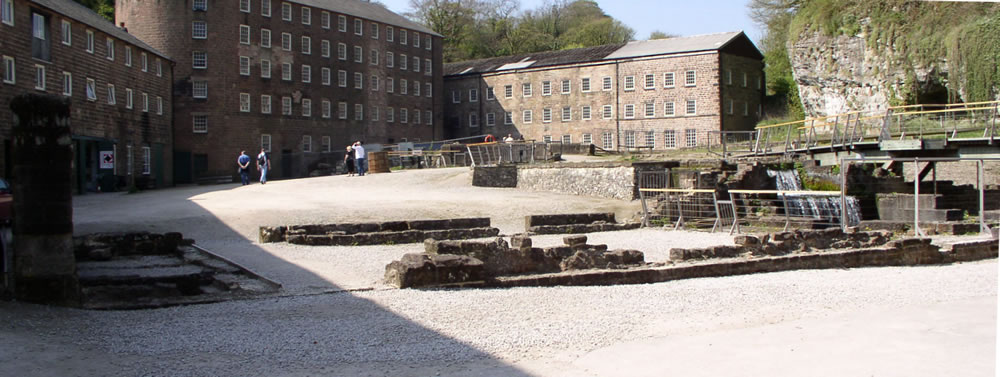
The location of the 1775 mill

=== Waterworks ===
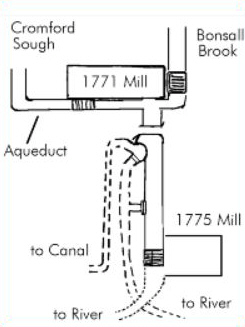
A composite diagram of the watercourses

Originally the sough drained into the brook back in the village, and both powered the original mill. The sough was separated and brought along a channel on the south side of Mill Road to the aqueduct. Both then supplied the second mill. In 1785 the mill was extended to its present length with a culvert beneath for the Bonsall Brook. The sough was separated from the brook and brought from the village along the south side of Mill Lane which it crossed by way of the aqueduct to a new overshot wheel. A complicated set of channels and sluices controlled the supply to the mill, or, on Sundays to the canal, with the surplus draining into the river.

Arkwright's use of the Bonsall Brook and Cromford Sough for his mills had been opposed by other local water users in a number of legal cases. In 1772, however, a new sough, Meerbrook Sough, had been started nearby, some 30m lower than Cromford Sough. By 1813 the new sough was affecting the water volumes in Cromford Sough, leading Arkwright's son (also Richard Arkwright) and the other users to negotiate with the Meerbrook proprietors to place stop boards so as to keep Cromford water levels up. Further legal cases followed, but by 1836 the stop boards had decayed and the negotiated leases had expired, so Cromford Sough was again reduced in flow. Finally Arkwright sued for his water in a landmark legal suit, but the case was lost, and soon after 1847 the Cromford Mills were obliged to cease cotton manufacturing, being turned over to other uses.

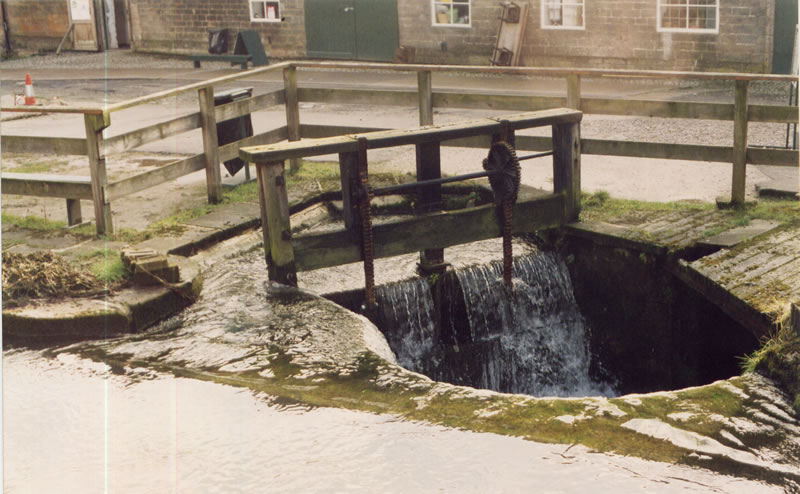
The sluice in the mill yard used to control the water supply

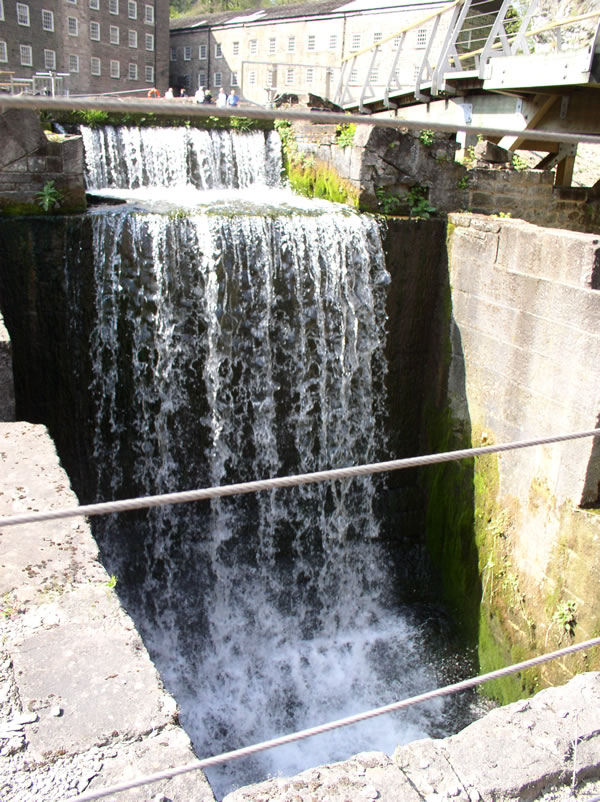
Location of the breastshot wheel for the 1775 mill

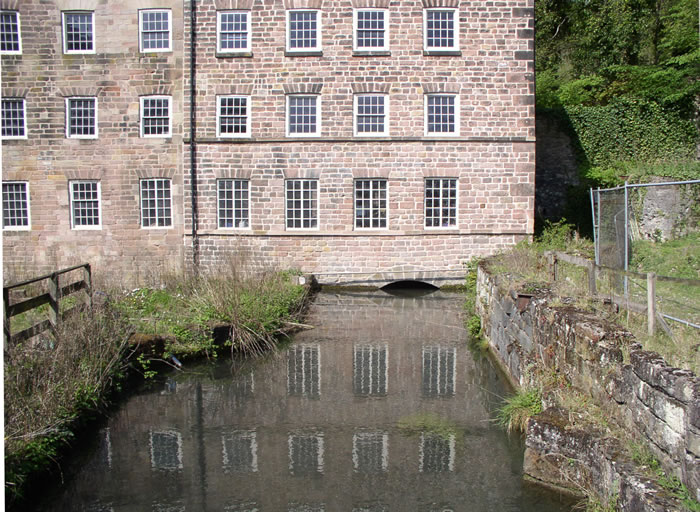
The culvert carrying the Bonsall Brook under the mill extension

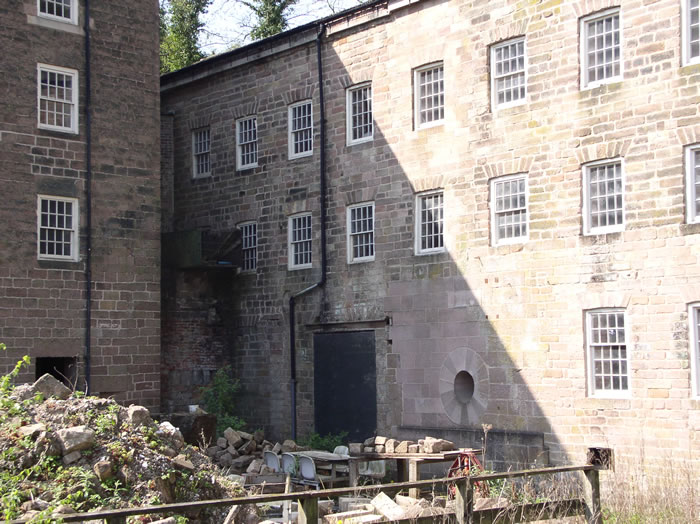
The 1771 mill showing the end of the aqueduct on the left and the hole in the wall where the wheel was located

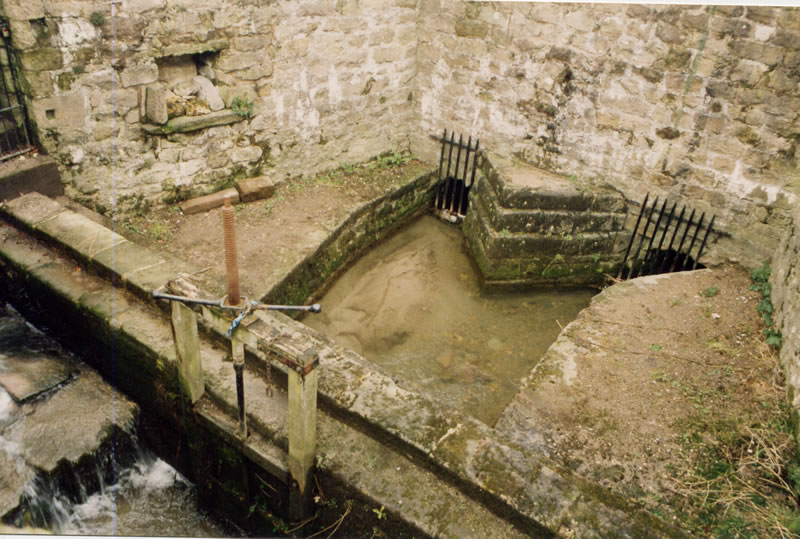
This shuttle in the village, known locally as the "Bear Pit", controlled the water from the sough.

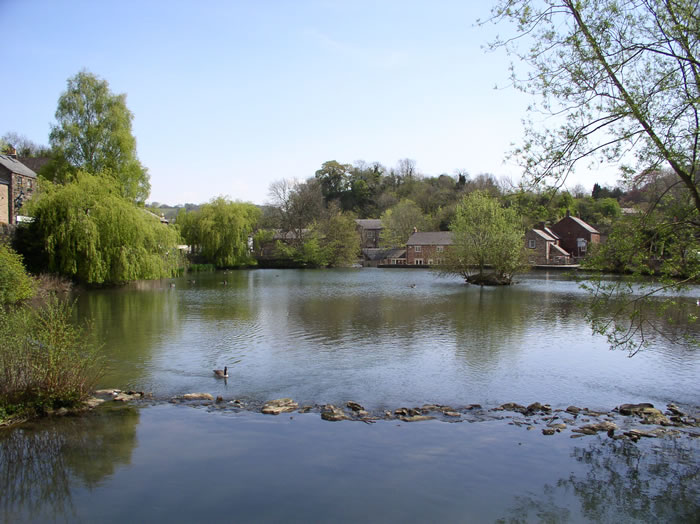
Cromford Pond built in 1785 as the mill pound

=== Housing ===
The mill manager had a house on site. Although the first workers were brought in from outside the area, workers' housing was later built in Cromford village.

=== Cromford Canal and wharf ===
The opening of the Cromford Canal and the associated Cromford Wharf in 1793 linked Arkwright's Mill to the major Midland and northern cities, although use of the canal was to decline as traffic moved onto the railways.

== Machinery ==
=== Water frame ===
Initially the first stage of the process was hand carding, but in 1775 he took out a second patent for a water-powered carding machine and this led to increased output and the fame of his factory rapidly spread. He was soon building further mills on this site and others and eventually employed 1,000 workers at Cromford. Many other mills were built under licence, including mills in Lancashire, Scotland and Germany. Samuel Slater, an apprentice of Jedediah Strutt, took the secrets of Arkwright's machines to Pawtucket, Rhode Island, USA, where he founded a cotton industry. Arkwright's success led to his patents being challenged in court and his second patent was overturned as having no originality. Nonetheless, by the time of his death in 1792 he was the wealthiest untitled person in Britain.

Cromford Mills has commissioned a replica water frame which was installed in April 2013. Considerable problems occurred in obtaining suitable roving, which had to be a low-twist 0.8 count cotton: there are no companies spinning cotton today in the United Kingdom. Roving was supplied eventually by Rieter in Switzerland, who had some experimental stock. Rieter are the world's largest manufacturer of textile manufacturing machines.

== See also ==
- Grade I listed buildings in Derbyshire
- Listed buildings in Cromford
- Kirk Mill
- Masson Mill
- New Lanark
