= Arkwright Society =

Charity in Derbyshire, England

The Arkwright Society is a registered charity engaged in the conservation of industrial monuments in Derbyshire, focusing on the water mills of Lumsdale Valley, Ashford, Cromford and Slinter Wood. It is named after Richard Arkwright who founded the world's first successful water powered cotton spinning mill in Cromford in 1771. The society was founded after a festival in 1971 to commemorate the 200th anniversary of this feat.

The society bought the site of Sir Richard Arkwright's Cromford Mills in 1979 and have since restored its Grade I listed buildings. As of October 2007, the work had cost four million pounds and 35 people were employed by the society at the site. Thieves stole a historic clock from the site in 2003.

Derwent Valley Mills, including Cromford Mills, is one of the UNESCO World Heritage Sites. The mill complex was also declared by Historic England as "one of the country’s 100 irreplaceable sites".

The Society also manages the Canal Warehouse at Cromford Wharf, having leased it since 1995, where 2 rooms are used as classrooms. The Society offers tours of the Wharf and the Cromford Canal.

The Society opened the Cromford Venture Centre in 1996 to provide accommodation for young people studying the industrial history of the region. It also owns Slinter Wood, a Site of Special Scientific Interest and a Special Area of Conservation, Slinter Cottage and Dunsley Meadows Local Nature Reserve.

In 2018, the society was planning to restore Building 17 "to transform it into a northern anchor site for the Derwent Valley Mills World Heritage site and ensure the visitor centre was sustainable".

In 2019, the society employed 100 persons; the restoration expenditure by that time was £48 million. In 2018, the "Cromford Mills Creative Cluster and World Heritage Site Gateway Project" was listed as a finalist for the "Best Major Regeneration of a Historic Building or Place" in the Historic England Angel Awards.

Derwent Valley Mills, including Cromford Mills, is one of the UNESCO World Heritage Sites. The mill complex was also declared by Historic England as "one of the country’s 100 irreplaceable sites". The complex is open daily to visitors.

There is also a Nottingham Arkwright Society based in the Nottingham Industrial Museum in the grounds of Wollaton Park.
