= St Mary's Church, Cromford =

Coordinates: 53°6′49.94″N 1°33′38.63″W

St Mary’s Church, Cromford
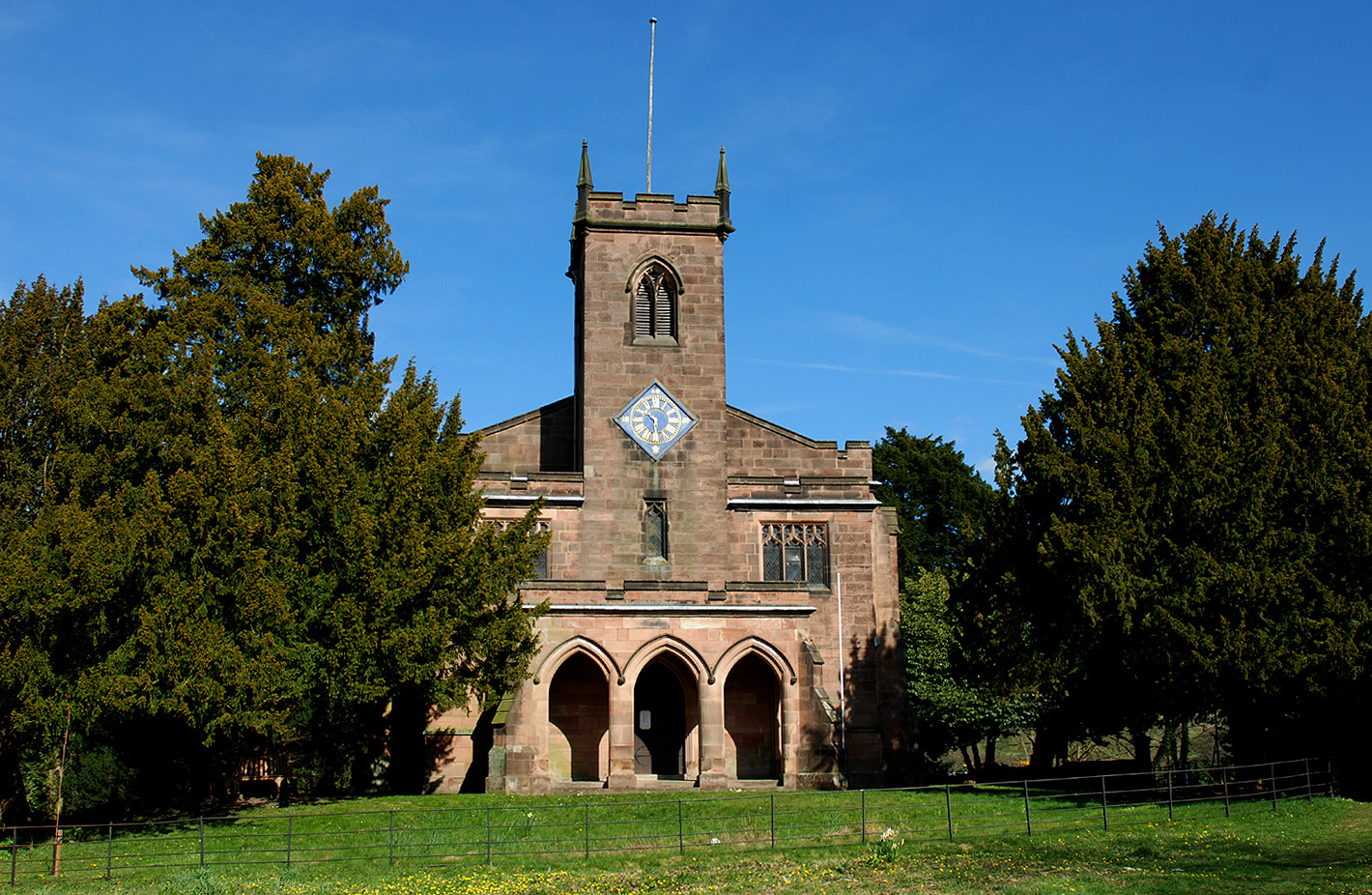
- St Mary’s Church, Cromford
- St Mary’s Church, Cromford
- Location: Cromford
- Country: England
- Denomination: Church of England

History
- Dedication: St Mary the Virgin

Architecture
- Heritage designation: Grade I listed
- Designated: 22 June 1950
- Architect: Thomas Gardner
- Groundbreaking: 1792
- Completed: 1797

Administration
- Province: Canterbury
- Diocese: Derby
- Archdeaconry: Derbyshire Peak & Dales
- Deanery: Carsington
- Parish: Cromford

St Mary's Church, Cromford, is a Grade I listed parish church in the Church of England in Cromford, Derbyshire.

== History ==
The current building replaced an ancient chapel. The church was built to the designs of the architect Thomas Gardner for the residents of Richard Arkwright’s mill in Cromford. Construction was completed during 1792-97.

After Sir Richard Arkwright's death (1792), he was buried at the church in Matlock, Derbyshire, but in 1797, his remains were moved to St. Mary’s; many others of the family were subsequently buried here.

The church comprises a nave with chancel, west tower and west narthex. It was remodelled in 1858 by Henry Isaac Stevens. The church's website provides these details:

The original Georgian church apparently consisted of a large rectangular open-plan nave and Sanctuary with the altar at the east end. In the mid-19th century the church was completely redesigned and extensively “Gothicised” in 1858–59 by Henry Isaac Stephens. The new church retained the wide proportions, Georgian nave and a new apsidal chancel and tower were added. The windows were remodelled and an exterior crenelated parapet and new roof added.

The Historic England summary states that the church features a "wide nave with lower and narrower chancel, west tower flanked by gallery stair turrets and with west narthex" and that the exterior is "in a lavish free Perpendicular style".

The wall paintings were executed by Alfred Octavius Hemming in 1898, when six tubular bells for the tower were added, and new stained glass was inserted. The historic listing summary describes the wall paintings as the "most striking feature of the interior" and adds that "the paintings were restored in 2002".

== Parish status ==
The church is in a joint parish with

- Holy Trinity Church, Matlock Bath

== Organ ==
The pipe organ was built by William Hill and dates from 1859. A specification of the organ can be found on the National Pipe Organ Register.

== See also ==
- Grade I listed churches in Derbyshire
- Grade I listed buildings in Derbyshire
- Listed buildings in Cromford
