= Johann Gottfried Brügelmann =

German industrialist

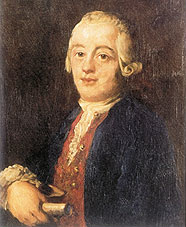
Johann Gottfried Brügelmann (circa 1800)

Johann Gottfried Brügelmann (baptized 6 July 1750 in Elberfeld, now a district of Wuppertal - 27 December 1802, Ratingen) was a German industrialist, most notable as founder of the first factory on mainland Europe, one of the forerunners of the Industrial Revolution.
