= Textile manufacture during the British Industrial Revolution =

Early textile production via automated means

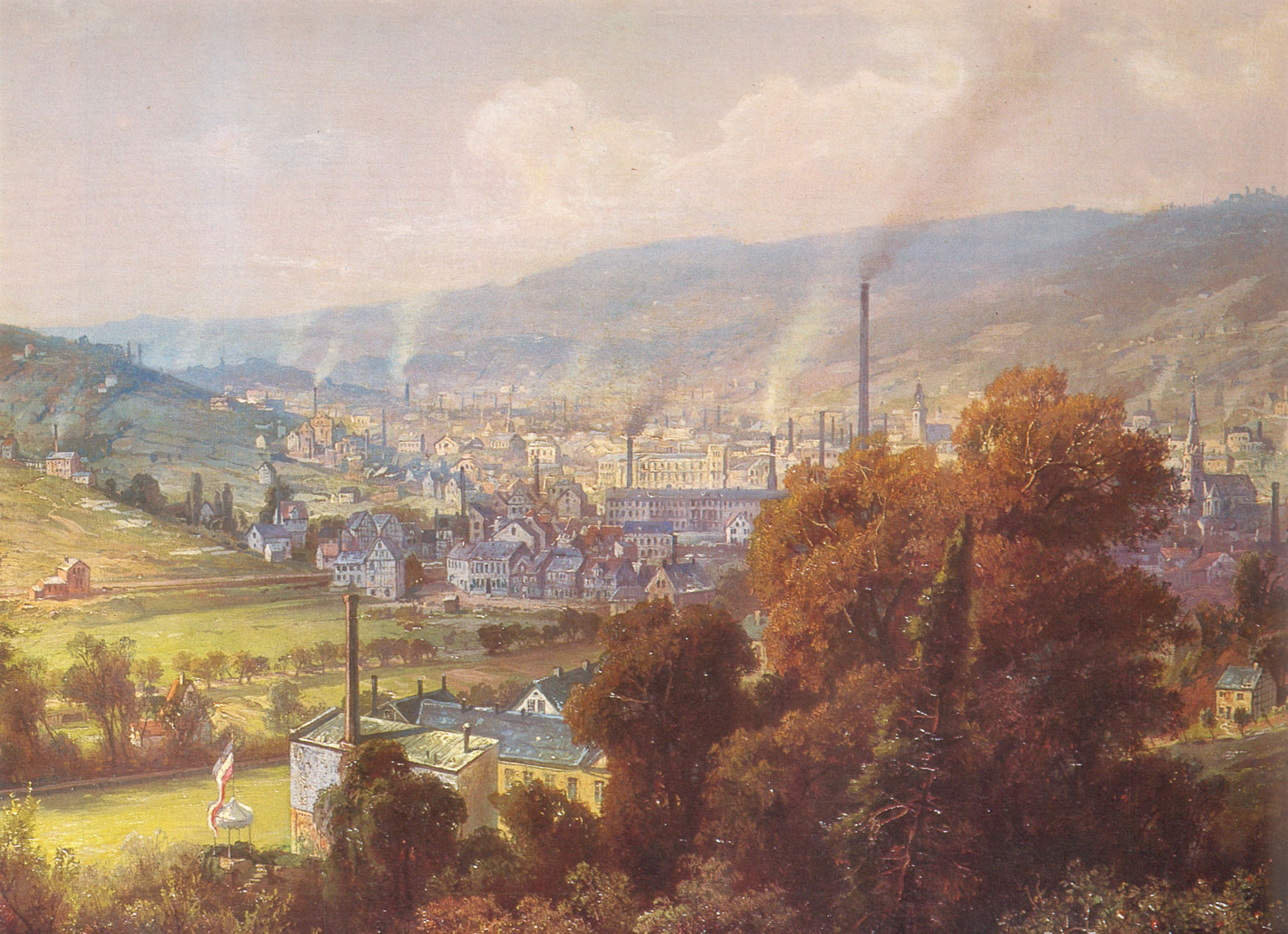
Early industrialised region at Barmen in the Wupper Valley, 1870 - painting by August von Wille

Textile manufacture during the British Industrial Revolution was centred in south Lancashire and the towns on both sides of the Pennines in the United Kingdom. The main drivers of the Industrial Revolution were textile manufacturing, iron founding, steam power, oil drilling, the discovery of electricity and its many industrial applications, the telegraph and many others. Railways, steamboats, the telegraph and other innovations massively increased worker productivity and raised standards of living by greatly reducing time spent during travel, transportation and communications.

Before the 18th century, the manufacture of cloth was performed by individual workers, in the premises in which they lived and goods were transported around the country by packhorses or by river navigations and contour-following canals that had been constructed in the early 18th century. In the mid-18th century, artisans were inventing ways to become more productive. Silk, wool, and linen fabrics were being eclipsed by cotton which became the most important textile.

Innovations in carding and spinning enabled by advances in cast iron technology resulted in the creation of larger spinning mules and water frames. The machinery was housed in water-powered mills on streams. The need for more power stimulated the production of steam-powered beam engines, and rotative mill engines transmitting the power to line shafts on each floor of the mill. Surplus power capacity encouraged the construction of more sophisticated power looms working in weaving sheds. The scale of production in the mill towns round Manchester created a need for a commercial structure; for a cotton exchange and warehousing. The technology was used in woollen and worsted mills in the West Yorkshire and elsewhere.

== Elements of the Industrial Revolution ==
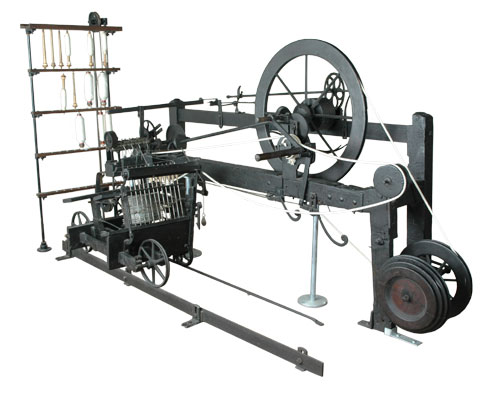
The only surviving example of a spinning mule built by the inventor Samuel Crompton

The commencement of the Industrial Revolution is closely linked to a small number of innovations, made in the second half of the 18th century:

- John Lombe's water-powered silk mill at Derby, built in 1717, was arguably the first successful highly mechanised factory in Britain.
- John Kay's 1733 flying shuttle enabled cloth to be woven faster, of a greater width, and for the process to later be mechanised. Cotton spinning using Richard Arkwright's water frame, James Hargreaves' spinning jenny, and Samuel Crompton's spinning mule (a combination of the spinning jenny and the water frame). This was patented in 1769 and so came out of patent in 1783. The end of the patent was rapidly followed by the erection of many cotton mills. Similar technology was subsequently applied to spinning worsted yarn for various textiles and flax for linen.
- The improved steam engine invented by James Watt and patented in 1775 was initially mainly used for pumping out mines, for water supply systems and to a lesser extent to power air blast for blast furnaces, but from the 1780s was applied to power machines. This enabled rapid development of efficient semi-automated factories on a previously unimaginable scale in places where waterpower was not available or not steady throughout the seasons. Early steam engines had poor speed control, which caused thread breakage, limiting their use in operations like spinning; however, this problem could be overcome by using the engine to pump water over a water wheel to drive the machinery.
- In the iron industry, coke was finally applied to all stages of iron smelting, replacing charcoal. This had been achieved much earlier for lead and copper as well as for producing pig iron in a blast furnace, but the second stage in the production of bar iron depended on the use of potting and stamping (for which a patent expired in 1786) or puddling (patented by Henry Cort in 1783 and 1784). Using a steam engine to power blast air to blast furnaces made higher furnace temperatures possible, which allowed the use of more lime to tie up sulfur in coal or coke. The steam engine also overcame the shortage of water power for iron works. Iron production surged after the 1750s when steam engines were increasingly employed in iron works.

These represent three 'leading sectors', in which there were key innovations, which allowed the economic takeoff by which the Industrial Revolution is usually defined. Later inventions such as the power loom and Richard Trevithick's high pressure steam engine were also important in the growing industrialisation of Britain. The application of steam engines to powering cotton mills and ironworks enabled these to be built in places that were most convenient because other resources were available, rather than where there was water to power a watermill.

== Industry and invention ==
Before the 1760s, textile production was a cottage industry using mainly flax and wool. A typical weaving family would own one handloom, which would be operated by the man with help of a boy; the wife, girls and other women could make sufficient yarn for that loom.

The knowledge of textile production had existed for centuries. India had a textile industry that used cotton, from which it manufactured cotton textiles. When raw cotton was exported to Europe it could be used to make fustian. Knitting machines too had long been known. The stocking frame was invented in 1589 and spread throughout England during the following two centuries, mechanising hosiery production. 14,000 were in use by 1750.

Two systems had developed for spinning: the simple wheel, which used an intermittent process and the more refined, Saxony wheel which drove a differential spindle and flyer with a heck that guided the thread onto the bobbin, as a continuous process. This was satisfactory for use on handlooms, but neither of these wheels could produce enough thread for the looms after the invention by John Kay in 1734 of the flying shuttle, which made the loom twice as productive.

Cloth production moved away from the cottage into manufactories. The first moves towards manufactories called mills were made in the spinning sector. The move in the weaving sector was later. By the 1820s, all cotton, wool, and worsted was spun in mills; but this yarn went to outworking weavers who continued to work in their own homes. A mill that specialised in weaving fabric was called a weaving shed.

== Early inventions ==
=== East India Company ===
During the second half of the 17th century, the newly established factories of the East India Company in South Asia started to produce finished cotton goods in quantity for the British market. The imported calico and chintz garments competed with, and acted as a substitute for Indian wool and the linen produce, resulting in local weavers, spinners, dyers, shepherds and farmers petitioning their MPs and in turn Parliament for a ban on the importation, and later the sale of woven cotton goods, which they eventually achieved via the 1700 and 1721 Calico Acts. The acts banned the importation and later the sale of finished pure cotton produce, but did not restrict the importation of raw cotton, or sale or production of fustian.

The exemption of raw cotton saw two thousand bales of cotton being imported annually, from Asia and the Americas, and forming the basis of a new indigenous industry, initially producing fustian for the domestic market, though more importantly triggering the development of a series of mechanised spinning and weaving technologies, to process the material. This mechanised production was concentrated in new cotton mills, which slowly expanded till by the beginning of the 1770s seven thousand bales of cotton were imported annually, and pressure was put on Parliament, by the new mill owners, to remove the prohibition on the production and sale of pure cotton cloth, as they wished to compete with the EIC imports.

Indian cotton textiles, mainly those from Bengal, continued to maintain a competitive advantage up until the 19th century. In order to compete with Indian goods, British merchants invested in labour-saving technical advancements, while the government implemented protectionist policies such as bans and tariffs to restrict Indian imports. Britain eventually surpassed India as the world's leading cotton textile manufacturer in the 19th century.

=== Britain ===
During the 18th and 19th centuries, much of the imported cotton came from plantations in the American South. In periods of political uncertainty in North America, during the Revolutionary War and later American Civil War, however, Britain relied more heavily on imports from the Indian subcontinent to supply its cotton manufacturing industry. Ports on the west coast of Britain, such as Liverpool, Bristol, and Glasgow, became important in determining the sites of the cotton industry.

Lancashire became a centre for the nascent cotton industry because the damp climate was better for spinning the yarn. As the cotton thread was not strong enough to use as warp, wool or linen or fustian had to be used. Lancashire was an existing wool centre. Likewise, Glasgow benefited from the same damp climate.

The early advances in weaving had been halted by the lack of thread. The spinning process was slow and the weavers needed more cotton and wool thread than their families could produce. In the 1760s, James Hargreaves improved thread production when he invented the Spinning Jenny. By the end of the decade, Richard Arkwright had developed the water frame. This invention had two important consequences: it improved the quality of the thread, which meant that the cotton industry was no longer dependent on wool or linen to make the warp, and it took spinning away from the artisans' homes to specific locations where fast-flowing streams could provide the water power needed to drive the larger machines. The Western Pennines of Lancashire became the centre for the cotton industry. Not long after the invention of the water frame, Samuel Crompton combined the principles of the Spinning Jenny and the Water Frame to produce his Spinning Mule. This provided even tougher and finer cotton thread.

The textile industry was also to benefit from other developments of the period. As early as 1691, Thomas Savery had made a vacuum steam engine. His design, which was unsafe, was improved by Thomas Newcomen in 1698. In 1765, James Watt further modified Newcomen's engine to design an external condenser steam engine. Watt continued to make improvements on his design, producing a separate condenser engine in 1774 and a rotating separate condensing engine in 1781. Watt formed a partnership with businessman Matthew Boulton, and together they manufactured steam engines which could be used by industry.

Prior to the 1780s, most of the fine quality cotton muslin in circulation in Britain had been manufactured in India. Due to advances in technique, British "mull muslin" was able to compete in quality with Indian muslin by the end of the 18th century.

=== Timeline of inventions ===
In 1734 in Bury, Lancashire, John Kay invented the flying shuttle – one of the first of a series of inventions associated with the cotton industry. The flying shuttle increased the width of cotton cloth and speed of production of a single weaver at a loom. Resistance by workers to the perceived threat to jobs delayed the widespread introduction of this technology, even though the higher rate of production generated an increased demand for spun cotton.

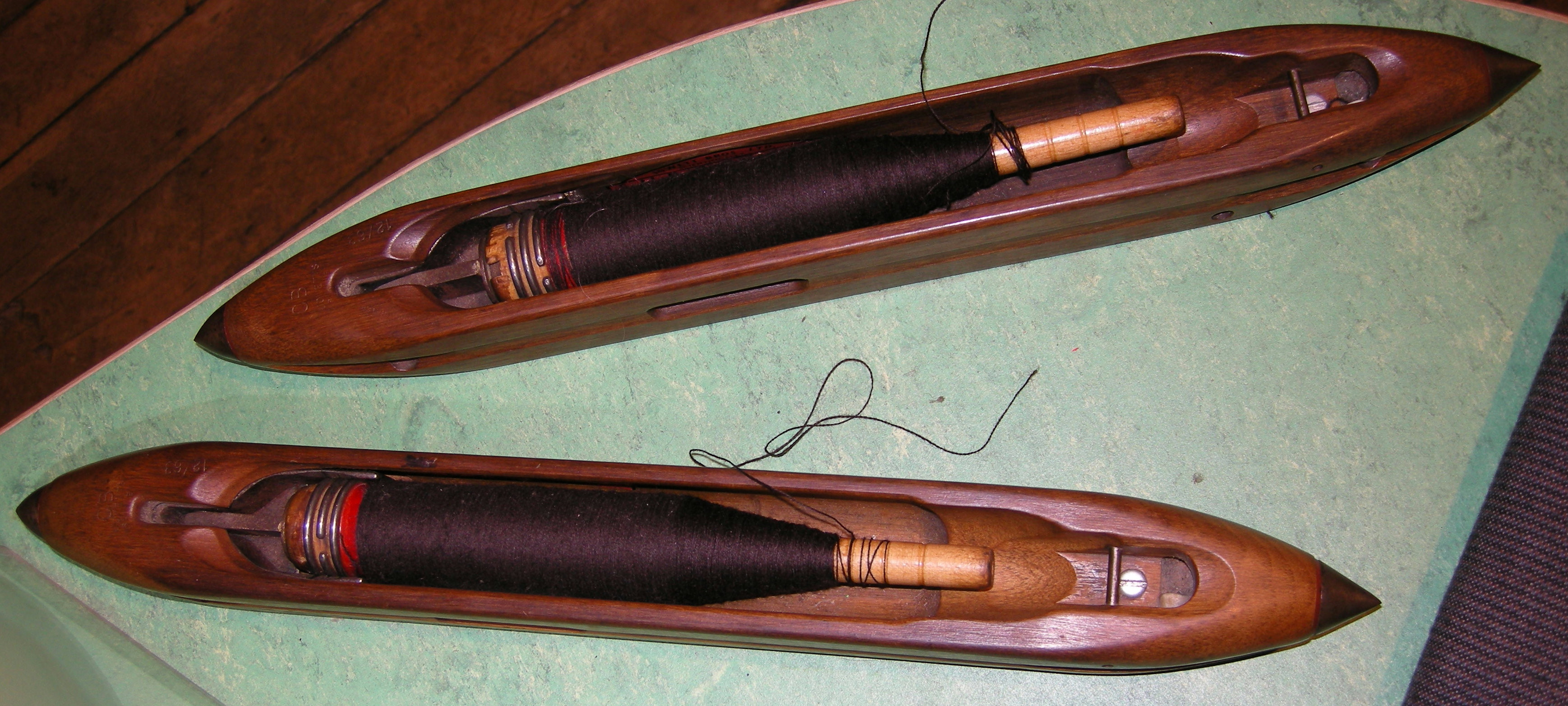
Shuttles at the Bradford Industrial Museum

In 1738, Lewis Paul (one of the community of Huguenot weavers that had been driven out of France in a wave of religious persecution) settled in Birmingham and with John Wyatt, of that town, they patented the roller spinning machine and the flyer-and-bobbin system, for drawing wool to a more even thickness. Using two sets of rollers that travelled at different speeds, yarn could be twisted and spun quickly and efficiently. This was later used in the first cotton spinning mill during the Industrial Revolution.

In 1742 Paul and Wyatt opened a mill in Birmingham which used their new rolling machine powered by donkey; this was not profitable and was soon closed.

In 1743 a factory opened in Northampton; fifty spindles turned on five of Paul and Wyatt's machines, proving more successful than their first mill. This operated until 1764.

In 1748 Lewis Paul invented the hand-driven carding machine. A coat of wire slips were placed around a card which was then wrapped around a cylinder. Lewis's invention was later developed and improved by Richard Arkwright and Samuel Crompton, although this came about under great suspicion after a fire at Daniel Bourn's factory in Leominster which specifically used Paul and Wyatt's spindles. Bourn produced a similar patent in the same year.

In 1758 Paul and Wyatt improved their roller spinning machine and took out a second patent. Richard Arkwright later used this as the model for his water frame.

=== Start of the Revolution ===
The Duke of Bridgewater's canal connected Manchester to the coal fields of Worsley. It was opened in July 1761. Matthew Boulton opened the Soho Foundry engineering works in Handsworth, Birmingham in 1762. These were both events that enabled cotton mill construction and the move away from home-based production. In 1764, Thorp Mill the first water-powered cotton mill in the world was constructed at Royton, Lancashire, England. It was used for carding cotton.

The multiple spindle spinning jenny was invented in 1764. James Hargreaves is credited as the inventor. This machine increased the thread production capacity of a single worker — initially eightfold and subsequently much further. Others credit the original invention to Thomas Highs. Industrial unrest forced Hargreaves to leave Blackburn, but more importantly for him, his unpatented idea was exploited by others. He finally patented it in 1770. As a result, there were over 20,000 spinning jennies in use (mainly unlicensed) by the time of his death.

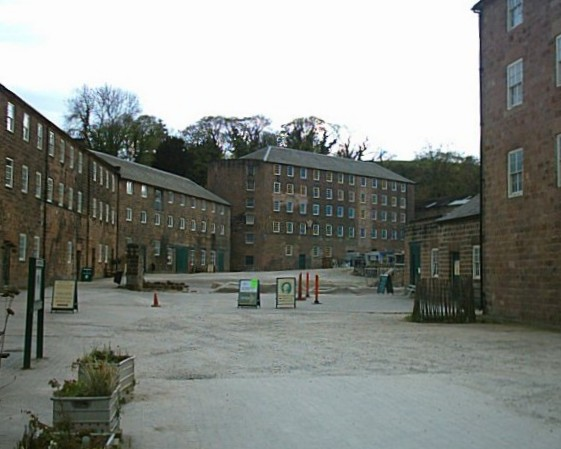
Arkwright's Cromford Mill

Richard Arkwright first spinning mill, Cromford Mill, Derbyshire, was built in 1771. It contained his invention the water frame. The water frame was developed from the spinning frame that Arkwright had developed with (a different) John Kay, from Warrington. The original design was again claimed by Thomas Highs: which he purposed he had patented in 1769. Arkwright used waterwheels to power the textile machinery. His initial attempts at driving the frame had used horse power, but a mill needed far more power. Using a waterwheel demanded a location with a ready supply of water, hence the mill at Cromford. This mill is preserved as part of the Derwent Valley Mills. Arkwright generated jobs and constructed accommodation for his workers which he moved into the area. This led to a sizeable industrial community. Arkwright protected his investment from industrial rivals and potentially disruptive workers. This model worked and he expanded his operations to other parts of the country.

Matthew Boulton partnership with Scottish engineer James Watt resulted, in 1775, in the commercial production of the more efficient Watt steam engine which used a separate condensor.

Samuel Crompton of Bolton combined elements of the spinning jenny and water frame in 1779, creating the spinning mule. This mule produced a stronger thread than the water frame could. Thus in 1780, there were two viable hand-operated spinning systems that could be easily adapted to run by power of water. Early mules were suitable for producing yarn for use in the manufacture of muslin, and were known as the muslin wheel or the Hall i' th' Wood (pronounced Hall-ith-wood) wheel. As with Kay and Hargreaves, Crompton was not able to exploit his invention for his own profit, and died a pauper.

In 1783 a mill was built in Manchester at Shudehill, at the highest point in the city away from the river. Shudehill Mill was powered by a 30 ft diameter waterwheel. Two storage ponds were built, and the water from one passed from one to the other turning the wheel. A steam driven pump returned the water to the higher reservoir. The steam engine was of the atmospheric type. An improvement devised by Joshua Wrigley, trialled in Chorlton-upon-Medlock used two Savery engines to supplement the river in driving on overshot waterwheel.

In 1784, Edmund Cartwright invented the power loom, and produced a prototype in the following year. His initial venture to exploit this technology failed, although his advances were recognised by others in the industry. Others such as Robert Grimshaw (whose factory was destroyed in 1790 as part of the growing reaction against the mechanisation of the industry) and Austin – developed the ideas further.

In the 1790s industrialists, such as John Marshall at Marshall's Mill in Leeds, started to work on ways to apply some of the techniques which had proved so successful in cotton to other materials, such as flax.

In 1803, William Radcliffe invented the dressing frame which was patented under the name of Thomas Johnson which enabled power looms to operate continuously.

=== Later developments ===
With the Cartwright Loom, the Spinning Mule and the Boulton & Watt steam engine, the pieces were in place to build a mechanised textile industry. From this point there were no new inventions, but a continuous improvement in technology as the mill-owner strove to reduce cost and improve quality. Developments in the transport infrastructure - the canals and, after 1831, the railways - facilitated the import of raw materials and export of finished cloth.

The use of water power to drive mills was supplemented by steam driven water pumps, and then superseded completely by the steam engines. For example, Samuel Greg joined his uncle's firm of textile merchants, and, on taking over the company in 1782, he sought out a site to establish a mill. Quarry Bank Mill was built on the River Bollin at Styal in Cheshire. It was initially powered by a water wheel, but installed steam engines in 1810. (Note: Quarry Bank Mill in Cheshire still exists as a well-preserved museum. It illustrates how the mill owners used child labour, taking orphans from nearby Manchester; it shows working conditions and how children were housed, clothed, fed and provided with some education. This mill also shows the transition from water power to steam power; steam engines to drive the looms being installed in 1810.) In 1830, the average power of a mill engine was 48 hp, but Quarry Bank mill installed a new 100 hp water wheel. This was to change in 1836, when Horrocks & Nuttall, Preston took delivery of 160 hp double engine. William Fairbairn addressed the problem of line-shafting and was responsible for improving the efficiency of the mill. In 1815 he replaced the wooden turning shafts that drove the machines at 50rpm, to wrought iron shafting working at 250 rpm, these were a third of the weight of the previous ones and absorbed less power. The mill operated until 1959.

==== Robert's power loom ====
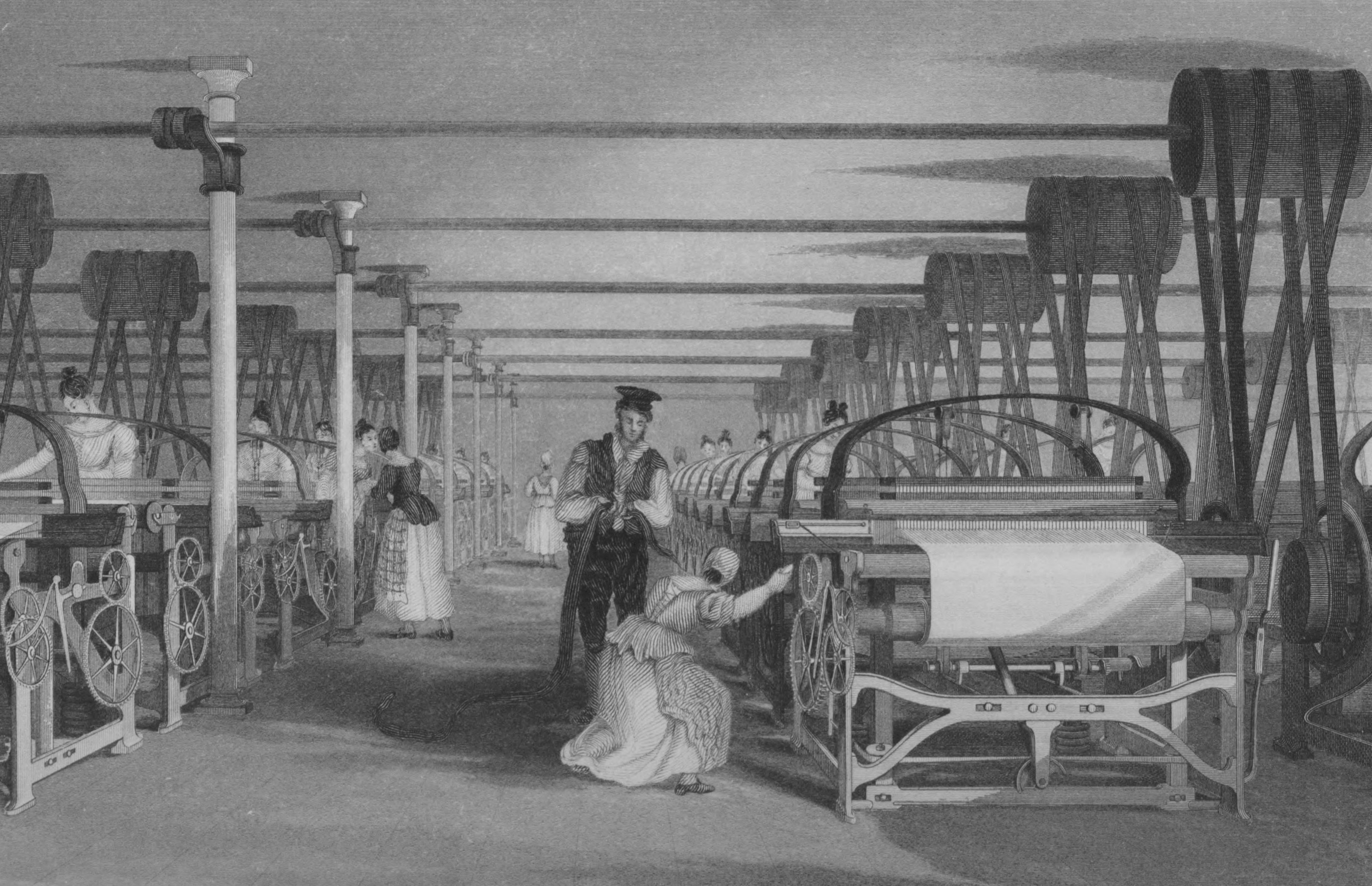
A Roberts loom in a weaving shed in 1835. Note the wrought iron shafting, fixed to the cast iron columns.

In 1830, using an 1822 patent, Richard Roberts manufactured the first loom with a cast-iron frame, the Roberts Loom. In 1842 James Bullough and William Kenworthy, made the Lancashire Loom. It is a semiautomatic power loom. Although it is self-acting, it has to be stopped to recharge empty shuttles. It was the mainstay of the Lancashire cotton industry for a century, when the Northrop Loom invented in 1894 with an automatic weft replenishment function gained ascendancy.

Number of looms in the UK
Year	1803	1820	1829	1833	1857
Looms	2,400	14,650	55,500	100,000	250,000

==== Robert's self acting mule ====
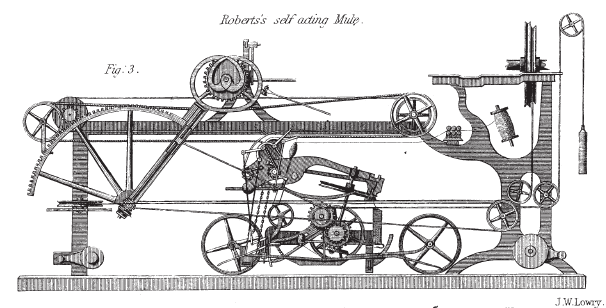
Roberts self-acting mule with quadrant gearing

Also in 1830, Richard Roberts patented the first self-acting mule. The Stalybridge mule spinners strike was in 1824, this stimulated research into the problem of applying power to the winding stroke of the mule. The draw while spinning had been assisted by power, but the push of the wind had been done manually by the spinner, the mule could be operated by semiskilled labour. Before 1830, the spinner would operate a partially powered mule with a maximum of 400 spindles after, self-acting mules with up to 1,300 spindles could be built.

The savings that could be made with this technology were considerable. A worker spinning cotton at a hand-powered spinning wheel in the 18th century would take more than 50,000 hours to spin 100 lb of cotton; by the 1790s, the same quantity could be spun in 300 hours by mule, and with a self-acting mule it could be spun by one worker in just 135 hours.

== Working practices ==
The nature of work changed during industrialisation from a craft production model to a factory-centric model. It was during the years 1761 to 1850 that these changes happened. Textile factories organised workers' lives much differently from craft production. Handloom weavers worked at their own pace, with their own tools, and within their own cottages. Factories set hours of work, and the machinery within them shaped the pace of work. Factories brought workers together within one building to work on machinery that they did not own. Factories also increased the division of labour. They narrowed the number and scope of tasks. They included children and women within a common production process. As Manchester mill owner Friedrich Engels decried, the family structure itself was "turned upside down" as women's wages undercut men's, forcing men to "sit at home" and care for children while the wife worked long hours. Factories flourished over manual craftsmanship because they had more efficient production output per worker, keeping prices down for the public, and they had much more consistent quality of product. The work-discipline was forcefully instilled upon the workforce by the factory owners, and he found that the working conditions were poor, and poverty levels were at an unprecedented high. Engels was appalled, and his research in Derby played a large role in his and Karl Marx's book Capital.

At times, the workers rebelled against poor wages. The first major industrial action in Scotland was that of the Calton weavers in Glasgow, who went on strike for higher wages in the summer of 1787. In the ensuing disturbances, troops were called in to keep the peace and three of the weavers were killed. There was continued unrest. In Manchester in May 1808, 15,000 protesters gathered on St George's Fields and were fired on by dragoons, with one man dying. A strike followed, but was eventually settled by a small wage increase. Worsening economic conditions and pay cuts after the end of the Napoleonic Wars contributed to social unrest and demands for democratic reforms, leading to the Peterloo massacre in 1819; the government initially responded with repressive measures, but democratic reforms were finally enacted by the Representation of the People Act 1832. In the general strike of 1842, half a million workers demanded the Charter and an end to pay cuts. Again, troops were called in to keep the peace, and the strike leaders were arrested, but some of the workers' demands were met.

The early textile factories employed a large share of children, but the share declined over time. In England and Scotland in 1788, two-thirds of the workers in 143 water-powered cotton mills were described as children. Sir Robert Peel, a mill owner turned reformer, promoted the 1802 Health and Morals of Apprentices Act, which was intended to prevent pauper children from working more than 12 hours a day in mills. Children had started in the mills at around the age of four, working as mule scavengers under the working machinery until they were eight, they progressed to working as little piecers which they did until they were 15. During this time they worked 14 to 16 hours a day, being beaten if they fell asleep. The children were sent to the mills of Derbyshire, Yorkshire and Lancashire from the workhouses in London and other towns in the south of England. A well-documented example was that of Litton Mill. Further legislation followed. By 1835, the share of the workforce under 18 years of age in cotton mills in England and Scotland had fallen to 43%. About half of workers in Manchester and Stockport cotton factories surveyed in 1818 and 1819 had begun work at under ten years of age. Most of the adult workers in cotton factories in mid-19th-century Britain were workers who had begun work as child labourers. The growth of this experienced adult factory workforce helps to account for the shift away from child labour in textile factories.

== A representative early spinning mill 1771 ==
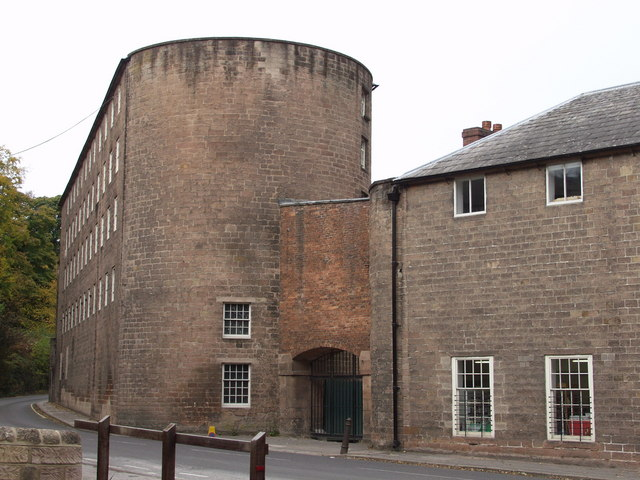
Gateway to Arkwright's Mill

Cromford Mill was an early Arkwright mill and was the model for future mills. The site at Cromford had year-round supply of warm water from the sough which drained water from nearby lead mines, together with another brook. It was a five-storey mill. Starting in 1772, the mills ran day and night with two 12-hour shifts.

It started with 200 workers, more than the locality could provide so Arkwright built housing for them nearby, one of the first manufacturers to do so. Most of the employees were women and children, the youngest being only 7 years old. Later, the minimum age was raised to 10 and the children were given 6 hours of education a week, so that they could do the record keeping their illiterate parents could not.

The first stage of the spinning process is carding, initially this was done by hand, but in 1775 he took out a second patent for a water-powered carding machine and this led to increased output. He was soon building further mills on this site and eventually employed 1,000 workers at Cromford. By the time of his death in 1792, he was the wealthiest untitled person in Britain. The gate to Cromford Mill was shut at precisely 6am and 6pm every day and any worker who failed to get through it not only lost a day's pay but was fined another day's pay. In 1779, Arkwright installed a cannon, loaded with grapeshot, just inside the factory gate, as a warning to would-be rioting textile workers, who had burned down another of his mills in Birkacre, Lancashire. The cannon was never used.

The mill structure is classified as a Grade I listed building, it was first classified in June 1950.

== A representative mid-century spinning mill 1840 ==
Brunswick Mill, Ancoats is a cotton spinning mill in Ancoats, Manchester, Greater Manchester. It was built around 1840, part of a group of mills built along the Ashton Canal, and at that time it was one of the country's largest mills. It was built round a quadrangle, a seven-storey block faced the canal. It was taken over by the Lancashire Cotton Corporation in the 1930s and passed to Courtaulds in 1964. Production finished in 1967.

The Brunswick mill was built around 1840 in one phase. The main seven storey block that faces the Ashton Canal was used for spinning. The preparation was done on the second floor and the self-acting mules with 400 spindles were arranged transversely on the floors above. The wings contained the blowing rooms, some spinning and ancillary processes like winding. The four storey range facing Bradford Road was used for warehousing and offices. The mill was built by David Bellhouse, but it is suspected that William Fairbairn was involved in the design. It is built from brick, and has slate roofs. Fireproof internal construction was now standard. Brunswick was built using cast iron columns and beams, each floor was vaulted with transverse brick arches. There was no wood in the structure. It was powered by a large double beam engine.

In 1850, the mill had some 276 carding machines, and 77,000 mule spindles, 20 drawing frames, fifty slubbing frames and eighty one roving frames.

The structure was good and it successfully converted to ring spinning in 1920- and was the first mill to adopt mains electricity as its principal source of power. The mill structure was classified as a Grade II listed building in June 1994.

== Export of technology ==
While profiting from expertise arriving from overseas (e.g. Lewis Paul), Britain was very protective of home-grown technology. In particular, engineers with skills in constructing the textile mills and machinery were not permitted to emigrate — particularly to the fledgeling America.

Horse power (1780–1790)

The earliest cotton mills in the United States were horse-powered. The first mill to use this method was the Beverly Cotton Manufactory, built in Beverly, Massachusetts. It was started on 18 August 1788 by entrepreneur John Cabot and brothers. It was operated in joint by Moses Brown, Israel Thorndike, Joshua Fisher, Henry Higginson, and Deborah Higginson Cabot. The Salem Mercury reported that in April 1788 the equipment for the mill was complete, consisting of a spinning jenny, a carding machine, warping machine, and other tools. That same year the mill's location was finalised and built in the rural outsets of North Beverly. The location had the presence of natural water, but it was cited the water was used for upkeep of the horses and cleaning of equipment, and not for mass-production.

Much of the internal designs of the Beverly mill were hidden due to concerns of competitors stealing designs. The beginning efforts were all researched behind closed doors, even to the point that the owners of the mill set up milling equipment on their estates to experiment with the process. There were no published articles describing exactly how their process worked in detail. Additionally, the mill's horse-powered technology was quickly dwarfed by new water-powered methods.

Slater

Following the creation of the United States, an engineer who had worked as an apprentice to Arkwright's partner Jedediah Strutt evaded the ban. In 1789, Samuel Slater took his skills in designing and constructing factories to New England, and he was soon engaged in reproducing the textile mills that helped America with its own industrial revolution.

Local inventions spurred this on, and in 1793 Eli Whitney invented and patented the cotton gin, which sped up the processing of raw cotton by over 50 times.

=== 1800s ===
In the mid-1800s some of the technology and tools were sold and exported to Russia. The Morozovs family, a well known 19th-century Russian merchant and textile family established a private company in central Russia that produced dyed fabrics on an industrial scale. Savva Morozov studied the process at the University of Cambridge in England and later, with the help of his family, widened his family's business and made it one of the most profitable in the Russian Empire.

== Art and literature ==
- William Blake: "And did those feet in ancient time", also known as "Jerusalem", (1804) and other works.
- Mrs Gaskell: Mary Barton (1848), North and South (1855)
- Charlotte Brontë: Shirley (1849)
- Cynthia Harrod-Eagles wrote fictional accounts of the early days of factories and the events of the Industrial Revolution in The Maiden (1985), The Flood Tide (1986), The Tangled Thread (1987), The Emperor (1988), The Victory (1989), The Regency (1990), The Reckoning (1992) and The Devil's Horse (1993), Volumes 8-13, 15 and 16 of The Morland Dynasty.
- Textile workshops and the Calico Acts are featured in the board game John Company.

== See also ==
- Textile manufacturing by pre-industrial methods
