= Arkwright House, Preston =

Arkwright House
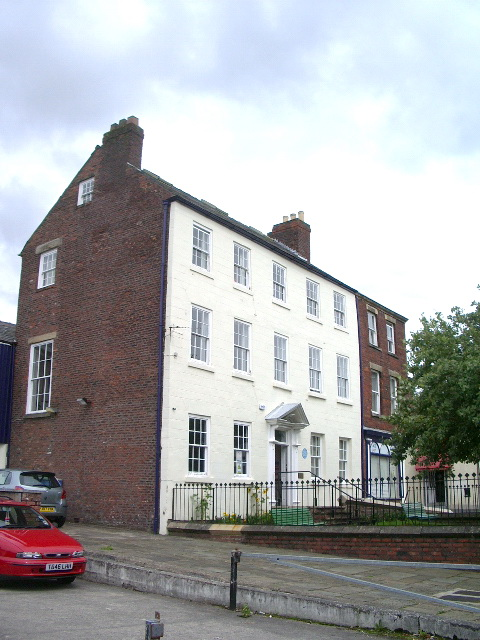
- Arkwright House

- Location in Preston
- 53.75773°N 2.69470°W
- Location: Stoneygate, Preston, Lancashire, England
- OS grid reference: SD 543 293

History
- Built: 1728

Site notes
- Architectural style: Georgian
- Restored: c. 1979

Listed Building – Grade II
- Designated: 12 June 1950

Arkwright House is in Stoneygate, Preston, Lancashire, England. The house was built in 1728, and was later expanded and restored. It is notable as the place in which Richard Arkwright and colleagues worked in 1768 to develop the water frame, a machine for spinning yarn. The house is an example of Georgian architecture, and is recorded in the National Heritage List for England as a designated Grade II* listed building.

== History ==
The house was built in 1728. It was the home of Revd Ellis Henry, who was the headmaster of the Free Grammar School in Stoneygate, and in 1768 Richard Arkwright was a lodger in the house. Arkwright was obsessed with the idea of creating a machine to spin yarn mechanically. During the time he was living in the house he worked with Thomas Highs and John Kay to develop a machine to do this. Their work was carried out in secrecy, the landlord thinking that they were working on a machine to measure the longitude. However it resulted in a machine known as the water frame, and this was patented in 1769. The historian David Hunt argues that this makes Arkwright House one of the birthplaces of the Industrial Revolution. The house was extended in the 19th century. A photograph taken in 1946 shows it with an inscription reading "ARKWRIGHT ARMS HOSTEL". The house was altered and renovated in about 1979, in conjunction with a government back to work initiative, to assist with Unemployment at the time. The Project Manager was Barrie James. The current owners are Age Concern Central Lancashire who support and deliver services to older people in and around Lancashire.

== Architecture ==
Arkwright House is built in brick, and has a partly stuccoed façade and a slate roof. It is in early Georgian style, and has an L-shaped plan consisting of a front range, a rear wing, and the 19th-century extension to the right. The house is in three storeys with an attic and cellar, and has a symmetrical five-bay front, plus a two-bay extension. The doorway has a wooden architrave with a pediment and a fanlight. The extension contains a shop window in the ground floor; the other windows are sashes.

== Appraisal ==
Arkwright House was designated as a Grade II* listed historic building on 12 June 1950. Grade II* is the middle of the three grades of listing and is applied to "particularly important buildings of more than special interest". Hartwell and Pevsner in the Buildings of England series comment that the house has been "over-restored".

== See also ==
- Grade II* listed buildings in Lancashire
- Listed buildings in Preston, Lancashire
