= Spinning jenny =

Multi-spool spinning frame

Model of spinning jenny in the Museum of Early Industrialisation, Wuppertal, Germany

The spinning jenny is a multi-spindle spinning frame, and was one of the key developments in the industrialisation of textile manufacturing during the early Industrial Revolution. It was invented in 1764–1765 by James Hargreaves in Stanhill, Oswaldtwistle, Lancashire in England.

The device reduced the amount of work needed to produce cloth, with a worker able to work eight or more spools at once. This grew to 120 as technology advanced. The yarn produced by the jenny was not very strong until Richard Arkwright invented the water-powered water frame. The spinning jenny helped to start the factory system of cotton manufacturing.

== History ==
The spinning jenny was invented by James Hargreaves. He was born in Oswaldtwistle, near Blackburn, around 1720. Blackburn was a town with a population of about 5,000, known for the production of "Blackburn greys", cloths of linen warp and cotton weft initially imported from India. They were usually sent to London to be printed.

At the time, cotton yarn production could not keep up with demand of the textile industry, and Hargreaves spent some time considering how to improve the process. The flying shuttle, invented by John Kay in 1733, had increased yarn demand by the weavers by doubling their productivity, and now the spinning jenny could supply that demand by increasing the spinners' productivity even more. The machine produced coarse thread.

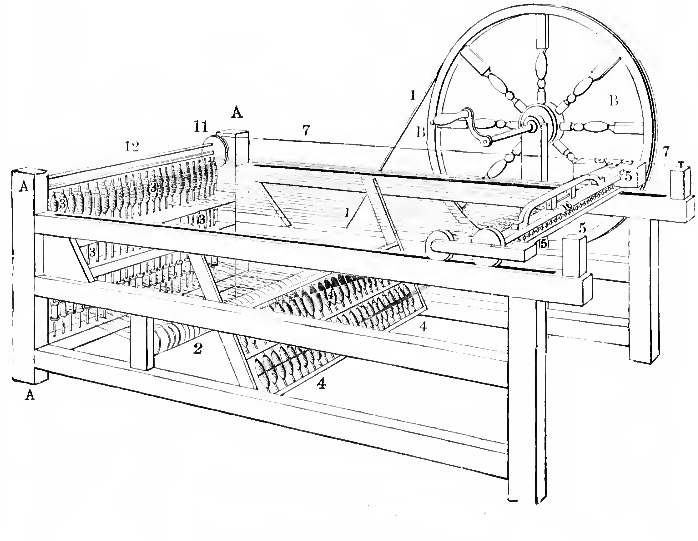
The improved spinning jenny that was used in textile mills

=== Components ===
The idea was developed by Hargreaves as a metal frame with eight wooden spindles at one end. A set of eight rovings was attached to a beam on that frame. The rovings when extended passed through two horizontal bars of wood that could be clasped together. These bars could be drawn along the top of the frame by the spinner's left hand thus extending the thread. The spinner used their right hand to rapidly turn a wheel which caused all the spindles to revolve, and the thread to be spun. When the bars were returned, the thread wound onto the spindle. A pressing wire (faller) was used to guide the threads onto the right place on the spindle.

=== The politics of cotton ===
In the 17th century, England was famous for its woollen and worsted cloth. That industry was centred in the east and south in towns such as Norwich which jealously protected their product. Cotton processing was tiny: in 1701 only 1,985,868 pounds (900,775 kg) of cotton-wool was imported into England, and by 1730 this had fallen to 1,545,472 pounds (701,014 kg). This was due to commercial legislation (Calico Acts) to protect the woollen industry. Cheap calico prints, imported by the East India Company from Hindustan (as India was then called), became popular. In 1700 an Act of Parliament was passed to prevent the importation of dyed or printed calicoes from India, China or Persia. This caused grey cloth (calico that had not been finished – dyed or printed) to be imported instead, and these were printed in southern England with popular patterns. Lancashire businessmen produced grey cloth with linen warp and cotton weft, which they sent to London to be finished. Cotton-wool imports recovered and by 1720 were almost back to 1701 levels. Again the woollen manufacturers claimed this was taking jobs from workers in Coventry. Another law was passed, to fine anyone caught wearing printed or stained calico; muslins, neckcloths and fustians were exempted. It was this exemption that the Lancashire manufacturers exploited.

The use of coloured cotton weft, with linen warp was permitted in the 1736 Manchester Act. There now was an artificial demand for woven cloth. In 1764, 3,870,392 pounds (1,755,580 kg) of cotton-wool was imported.

=== The economics of Northern England in 1750 ===
In England, before canals, railways, and before the turnpikes, the only way to transport goods such as calicos, broadcloth or cotton-wool was by packhorse. Strings of packhorses travelled along a network of bridle paths. A merchant would be away from home most of the year, carrying his takings in cash in his saddlebag. Later a series of chapmen would work for the merchant, taking wares to wholesalers and clients in other towns, and with them would go sample books.

Before 1720, the handloom weaver spent part of each day visiting neighbours buying any weft they had. Carding and spinning might be the only income for that household, or part of it. The family might farm a few acres and card, spin and weave wool and cotton. It took three carders to provide the roving for one spinner, and up to three spinners to provide the yarn for one weaver. The process was continuous, and done by both sexes, from the youngest to the oldest. The weaver would go once a week to the market with his wares and offer them for sale.

A change came about 1740 when fustian masters gave out raw cotton and warps to the weavers and returned to collect the finished cloth (Putting-out system). The weaver organised the carding, spinning and weaving to the master's specification. The master then dyed or printed the grey cloth, and took it to shopkeepers. Ten years later this had changed and the fustian masters were middle men, who collected the grey cloth and took it to market in Manchester where it was sold to merchants who organised the finishing.

To hand weave a 12-pound (5.4 kg) piece of eighteenpenny weft took 14 days and paid 36 shillings in all. Of this nine shillings was paid for spinning, and nine for carding. So by 1750, a rudimentary manufacturing system feeding into a marketing system emerged.

In 1738, John Kay started to improve the loom. He improved the reed, and invented the raceboard, the shuttleboxes and the picker which together allowed one weaver to double his output. This invention is commonly called the flying shuttle. It met with violent opposition and he fled from Lancashire to Leeds. Though the workers thought this was a threat to their jobs, it was adopted and the pressure was on to speed up carding and spinning.

The shortage of spinning capacity to feed the more efficient looms provided the motivation to develop more productive spinning techniques such as the spinning jenny, and triggered the start of the Industrial Revolution.

== Success ==
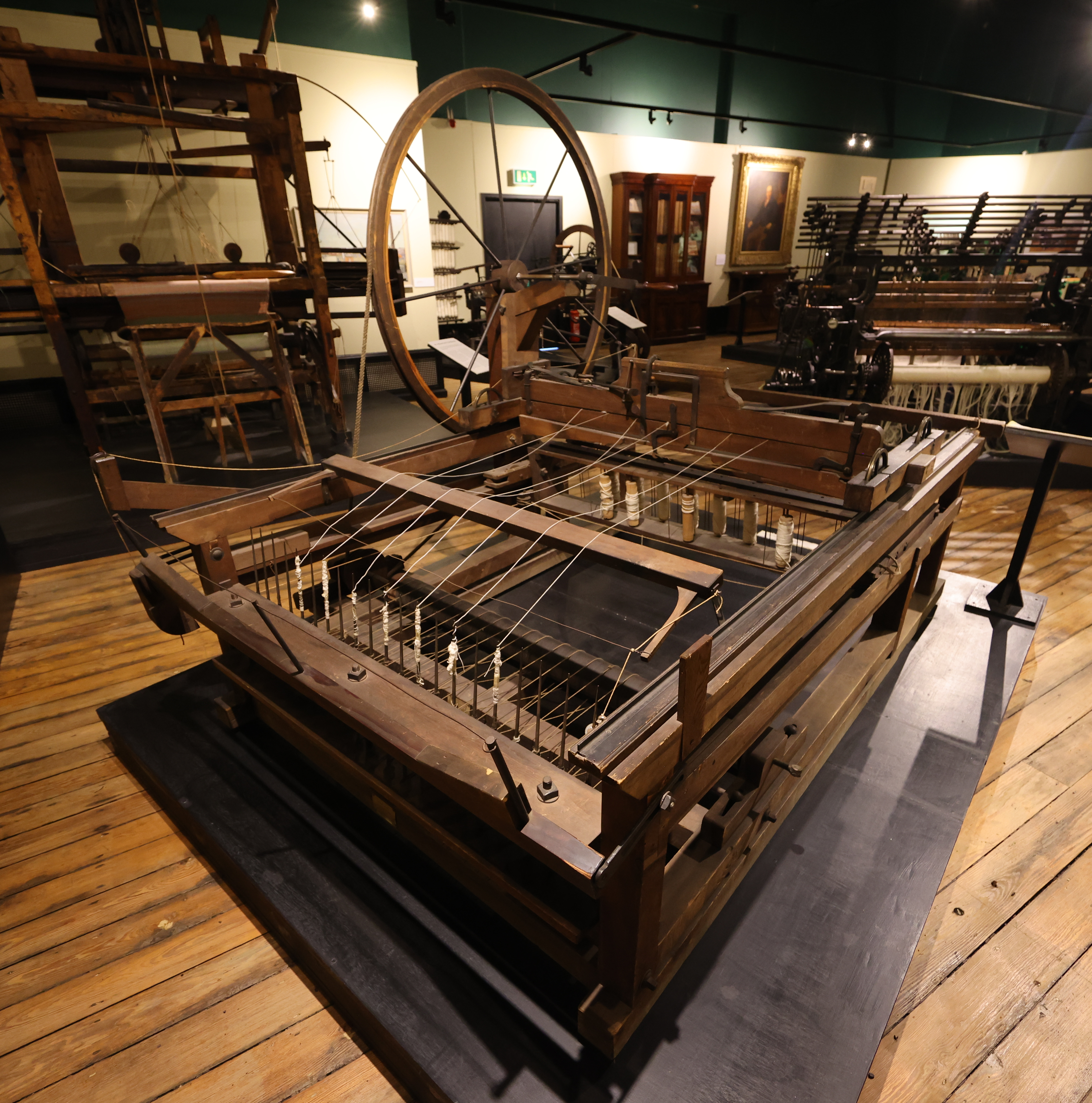
Spinning jenny at Blackburn Museum and Art Gallery

Around 1764–1765, Hargreaves invented the spinning jenny. He kept the machine secret for some time, but he produced a number for his own growing industry. The price of yarn fell, angering the large spinning community in Blackburn. Eventually they broke into his house and smashed his machines, forcing him to flee to Nottingham in 1768. This was a centre for the hosiery industry, and knitted silks, cottons and wool. There he set up shop producing jennies in secret for one Mr Shipley, with the assistance of a joiner named Thomas James. He and James set up a textile business in Mill Street. On 12 July 1770, he took out a patent (no. 962) on his invention, the Spinning Jenny—a machine for spinning, drawing and twisting cotton. By this time a number of spinners in Lancashire were using copies of the machine, and Hargreaves sent notice that he was taking legal action against them. The manufacturers met, and offered Hargreaves £3,000. He at first demanded £7,000, and stood out for £4,000, but the case eventually fell apart when it was learned he had sold several in the past.

The spinning jenny succeeded because it held more than one ball of yarn, making more yarn in a shorter time and reducing the overall cost. The spinning jenny would not have been such a success if the flying shuttle had not been invented and installed in textile factories. Its success was limited in that it required the rovings to be prepared on a wheel, and this was limited by the need to card by hand. It continued in common use in the cotton and fustian industry until about 1810. The spinning jenny was superseded by the spinning mule. The jenny was adapted for the process of slubbing, being the basis of the Slubbing Billy.

== Origin and myth ==
The most common story told about the invention of the device and the origin of the jenny in the machine's name is that one of his daughters (or his wife) named Jenny knocked over one of their own spinning wheels. The device kept working normally, with the spindle now pointed upright. Hargreaves realised there was no particular reason the spindles had to be horizontal, as they always had been, and he could place them vertically in a row.

The name is variously said to derive from this tale. The Registers of Church Kirk show that Hargreaves had several daughters, but none named Jenny (neither was his wife). A more likely explanation of the name is that jenny was an abbreviation of engine.

Thomas Highs of Leigh has claimed to be the inventor and the story is repeated using his wife's name.

Another myth has Thomas Earnshaw inventing a spinning device of a similar description – but destroying it after fearing he might be taking bread out of the mouths of the poor.

== See also ==
- Cotton mill
- Luddite
- Spinning mule
- Textile manufacture during the Industrial Revolution
- Textile manufacturing
- Timeline of clothing and textiles technology

== Bibliography ==
- Baines, Edward (1835). History of the cotton manufacture in Great Britain;. London: H. Fisher, R. Fisher, and P. Jackson.
- Nasmith, Joseph (1895). Recent Cotton Mill Construction and Engineering (Elibron Classics ed.). London: John Heywood. ISBN 1-4021-4558-6.
- Marsden, Richard (1884). Cotton Spinning: its development, principles and practice. George Bell and Sons 1903.
- Marsden, ed. (1909). Cotton Yearbook 1910. Manchester: Marsden and Co.
- Espinasse, Francis (1874). Lancashire Worthies. London: Simpkin, Marshall, & Co.
- Guest, Richard (1828). The British Cotton Manufactures: and a Reply to an Article on the Spinning Contained in a Recent Number of the Edinburgh Review. London: E. Thomson & Sons and W. & W. Clarke and Longman, Rees, & Co.
- Timmins, Geoffrey (1993), The Last Shift:The decline of handloom weaving in nineteenth-century Lancashire, Manchester: Manchester University Press, p. 253, ISBN 0 7190-3725-5
