= Thorp Mill, Royton =

Cotton mill in Lancashire, England

Thorp Mill
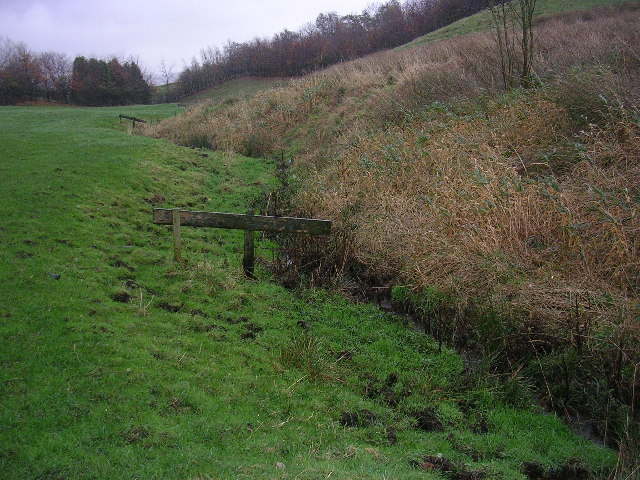
- Landscape around Royton, showing the River Irk

- Location in Greater Manchester

Carding
- Location: Thorp, Royton, Lancashire, England
- Owner: Ralph Taylor
- Further ownership: James Taylor (before 1788)
- Coordinates: 53.5660°N 2.1358°W

Construction
- Completed: 1764 (Conversion from cottages)
- Demolished: Reverted to cottages before 1800

Equipment
- Carding Equipment: Yes

Thorp Mill, Royton was built by Ralph Taylor at Thorp Clough in 1764. This is reputed to be the first cotton mill in Lancashire to be powered by water. Ralph Taylor bought three existing cottages which he converted into a mill. This was a carding mill, and was powered by a water wheel driven from Thorp Clough, a tributary of the River Irk. The mill closed in 1788 when the mill and contents were advertised for sale by the then owner James Taylor. It was advertised again in 1792, and the buildings reverted to cottages, and were subsequently demolished. The mill is marked by a blue plaque.

Thorp itself is higher up the clough and is the oldest hamlet in Royton, Lancashire.

The construction of more mills followed, which initiated a process of urbanisation and socioeconomic transformation in the region; the population moved away from farming, adopting employment in the factory system. The introduction of which led to a tenfold increase of Royton's population in less than a century; from 260 in 1714 to 2,719 in 1810. The introduction of textile manufacture during the Industrial Revolution facilitated a process of unplanned urbanisation in the area, and by the mid-19th century Royton had emerged as a mill town.
