= Spinning frame =

Industrial Revolution invention for spinning thread in a mechanized way

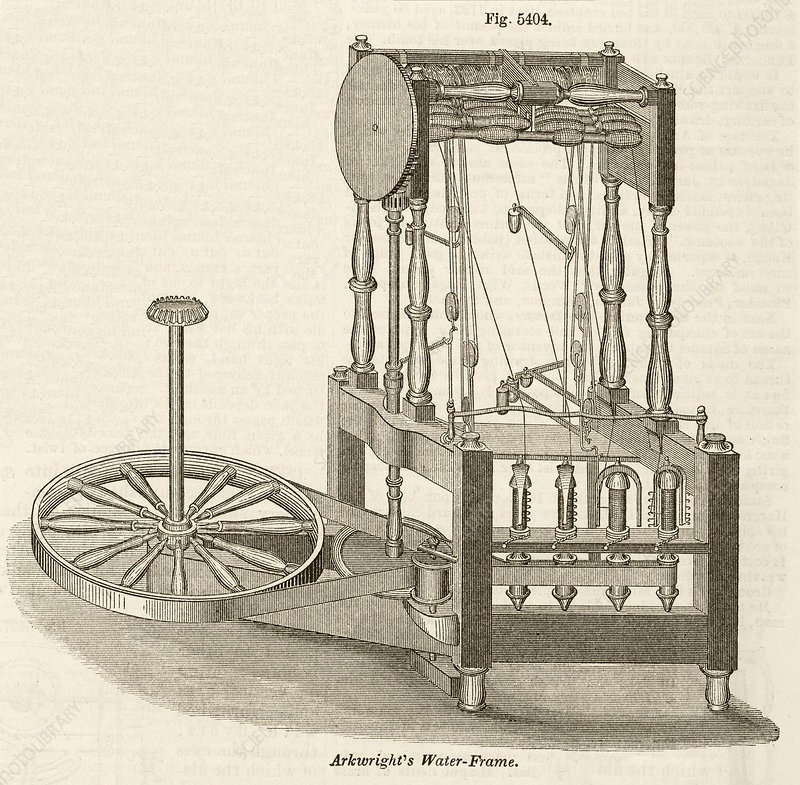

The spinning frame is an Industrial Revolution invention for spinning thread or yarn from fibres such as wool or cotton in a mechanized way. It was developed in 18th-century Britain by Richard Arkwright and John Kay.

== Historical context ==
In 1760 England, yarn production from wool, flax and cotton was still a cottage industry in which fibres were carded and spun by hand using a spinning wheel. As the textile industry expanded its markets and adopted faster machines, yarn supplies became scarce especially due to innovations such as the doubling of the loom speed after the invention of the flying shuttle. High demand for yarn spurred invention of the spinning jenny in 1764, followed closely by the invention of the spinning frame, later developed into the water frame (patented in 1769). Mechanisms had increased production of yarn so dramatically that by 1830 the cottage yarn industry in England could no longer compete and all spinning was carried out in factories.

== Development ==
Richard Arkwright employed John Kay to produce a new spinning machine that Kay had worked on with (or possibly stolen from) another inventor named Thomas Highs. With the help of other local craftsmen, including Peter Atherton, the team developed the spinning frame, which produced a stronger thread than the spinning jenny invented by James Hargreaves. The frame utilised the draw rollers invented by Lewis Paul to stretch, or attenuate, the yarn.

The roller spinning process starts with a thick 'string' of loose fibres called a roving, which is passed between three pairs of rollers, each pair rotating slightly faster than the previous one. In this way it is reduced in thickness and increased in length before a strengthening twist is added by a bobbin-and-flyer mechanism. The spacing of the rollers has to be slightly greater than the fiber length to prevent breakage. The nip of the roller pairs prevents the twist from backing up to the roving.

Too large to be operated by hand, the spinning frame needed a new source of power. Arkwright experimented with horses, but decided to employ the power of the water wheel, which gave the invention the name 'water frame'.

For some time, the stronger yarn produced by the spinning frame was used in looms for the lengthwise warp threads that bound cloth together, while hand powered jennies provided the weaker yarn used for the horizontal filler (weft) threads. The jennies required skill but were inexpensive and could be used in a home. The spinning frames required capital but little skill.

In France, Philippe Henri de Girard patented spinning frames for both the dry and wet spinning of flax. His inventions were also patented in England in 1815, in the name of Horace Hall. Little is known about Horace Hall, it is a possible pseudonym. Undoubtedly if he had taken out his patent in England in 1815, the year of the Battle of Waterloo, in a French name there would not have been a lot of enthusiasm for it; possibly even suspicion.

In the British Isles, James Kay was initially credited with the invention of this device. On 2 December 1826 shortly after Kay's patent was awarded, Philippe Henri de Girard wrote to the Editor of The Manchester Guardian complaining about and pointing out he had been the inventor. The following is an extract from his letter:

A few months ago, a gentleman of the name of Kay, excited a strong sensation in the trade, by announcing a new method of spinning flax, by which much finer and better yarn was produced, than by any other process previously adopted. He announced this invention not only as new, but as his own; the results of his experiments were published in many provincial and London papers; and he granted to several flax-spinners, the right of using his invention, for which he obtained a patent. The public will now hear, perhaps with some astonishment, that all this noise was made for a discovery long since published on the continent, and even patented in England twelve years ago. This new process of spinning, announced by Mr. Kay, is the same which I invented fourteen years since, and which is established, with great success, in France, Saxony, and Germany. A patent was taken out in England, in the month of May, 1815, by my partners in Paris, Messers. Cachard and Lanthois, in the name of Mr. Horace Hall.

Kay's patent was invalidated, in 1839, on the grounds it was too similar to Horace Hall's; A decision upheld on appeal, in 1841.

== Bibliography ==
- Hammond, J. L.; Hammond, Barbara (1919). The Skilled Labourer 1760–1832 (PDF). London: Longmans, Green and Co.
