= William Radcliffe =

British inventor

William Radcliffe (1761?, in Mellor, Derbyshire – 20 May 1842, in Stockport) was a British inventor and author of the essay Origin of the New System of Manufacture, Commonly Called Power Loom Weaving.

== Biography ==
Radcliffe came from a modest family that had made the transition from farming to weaving. His father taught him about carding and spinning. In 1785, he purchased several spinning machines that had been developed by James Hargreaves. Hargreaves' machine, called the spinning jenny, was the first wholly successful improvement on the traditional spinning wheel. Its advantage was to multiply many times the amount of yarn that could be spun by a single operator. This development and others such as weavers being able to rely on uninterrupted supplies of yarn led to spinning being concentrated in factories.

== Powerloom weaving ==
In 1789, Radcliffe opened a large cotton weaving factory at Mellor, in Derbyshire (now Greater Manchester). He streamlined the process by inventing a machine to improve the quality of cloth. In 1804 he invented a ratchet wheel that moved the cloth forward automatically. Radcliffe also contributed to the debate amongst entrepreneurs on what constituted profits in a capitalist system. In a letter dated 1 May 1804, which was never sent but later published in an 1811 book called Letters on the Evils of the Exportation of Cotton Yarns, Radcliffe said he regarded profit as being made up of two parts: interest on money and a sort of entrepreneurial wage.

In 1828, he wrote the essay Origin of the New System of Manufacture, Commonly Called Power Loom Weaving, later reprinted in J. F. C. Harrison's Society and Politics in England, 1780–1960 (New York: Harper & Row, 1965).

== See also ==
- Industrial Revolution
- Weaving
- Spinning jenny
