= Calico Acts =

Acts of the Parliament of England

Encouragement of Manufactures Act 1698
- Act of Parliament
- Parliament of England
- Long title: An Act for the more effectuall imploying the Poor by incourageing the Manufactures of this Kingdom.
- Citation: 11 Will. 3. c. 10 (Note: This is the citation in The Statutes of the Realm.); 11 & 12 Will. 3. c. 10 (Note: This is the citation in The Statutes at Large.)
- Territorial extent: England and Wales

Dates
- Royal assent: 11 April 1700
- Commencement: 29 September 1701 (Note: Section 1.)
- Repealed: 15 July 1867
Other legislation
Amended by	Customs Law Repeal Act 1825
Repealed by	Statute Law Revision Act 1867

Status: Repealed

Text of statute as originally enacted

Woollen, etc., Manufactures Act 1720
- Act of Parliament
- Parliament of Great Britain
- Long title: An Act to preserve and encourage the woollen and silk manufacturers of this kingdom, and for more effectual employing the poor, by prohibiting the use and wear of all printed, painted, stained or dyed callicoes in apparel, household stuff, furniture, or otherwise, after the twenty fifth day of December one thousand seven hundred and twenty two (except as therein is excepted).
- Citation: 7 Geo. 1. St. 1. c. 7
- Territorial extent: Great Britain

Dates
- Royal assent: 23 March 1721
- Commencement: 25 December 1722 (Note: Section 1.)
- Repealed: 15 July 1867
Other legislation
Repealed by	Statute Law Revision Act 1867

Status: Repealed

Text of statute as originally enacted

The Calico Acts (1700, 1721) were acts of the Parliament of England and the Parliament of Great Britain which banned the import of most cotton textiles into England, followed by the restriction of sale of most cotton textiles. It was a form of economic protectionism, largely in response to India (particularly Bengal), which dominated world cotton textile markets at the time. The acts were a precursor to the Industrial Revolution, when Britain eventually surpassed India as the world's leading textile manufacturer in the 19th century.

== Context ==
The English East India Company introduced Britain to cheap calico and chintz cloth after the restoration of the monarchy in the 1660s. Initially imported as a novelty side line, from its spice trading posts in Asia, the cheap colourful cloth proved popular and overtook the EIC's spice trade by value in the late 17th century. The EIC embraced the demand, particularly for calico, by expanding its factories in Asia and producing and importing cloth in bulk, creating competition for domestic woollen and linen textile producers.

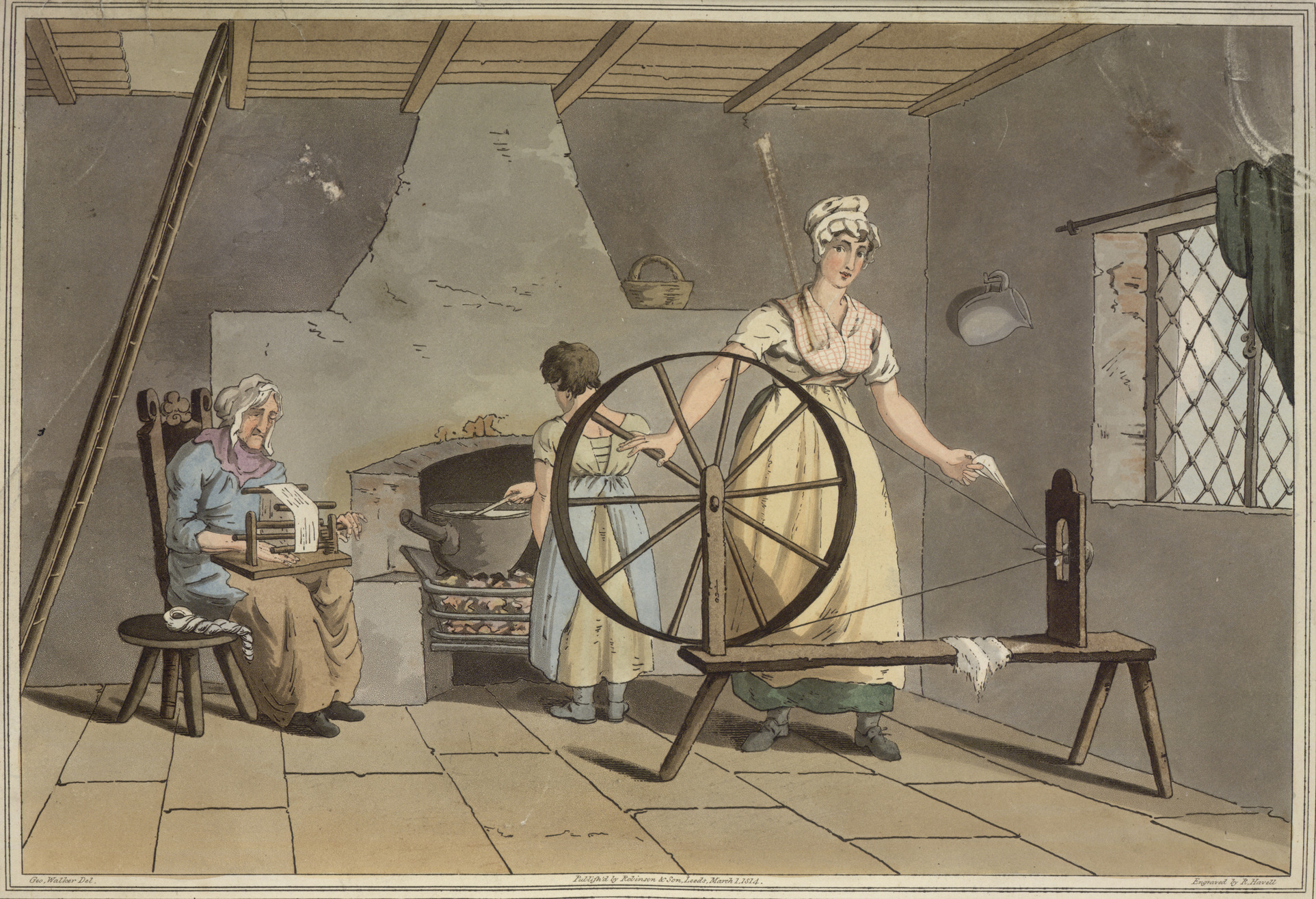
George Walker, 1814

The impacted weavers, spinners, dyers, shepherds and farmers objected, with Parliament petitioned, the EIC offices stormed by a mob, the fashion conscious assaulted for wearing imported cloth, making the calico question one of the major issues of national politics between the 1680s and the 1730s. Parliament began to see a decline in domestic textile sales, and an increase in imported textiles from places like China and India. Seeing the East India Company and their textile importation as a threat to domestic textile businesses, Parliament passed the Encouragement of Manufactures Act 1698 (11 Will. 3. c. 10), blocking the importation of cotton cloth. As there was no punishment for continuing to sell cotton cloth, smuggling of the popular material became commonplace.

Dissatisfied with the outcome of the first act, in 1721 Parliament passed a stricter addition, the Woollen, etc., Manufactures Act 1720 (7 Geo. 1. St. 1. c. 7). This time prohibiting the sale of most cottons, imported and domestic (exempting only thread Fustian and raw cotton). The exemption of raw cotton from the prohibition initially saw 2,000 bales of raw cotton imported annually, to become the basis of a new indigenous industry, initially producing Fustian for the domestic market, though more importantly triggering the development of a series of mechanised spinning and weaving technologies, to process the material. This mechanised production was concentrated in new cotton mills, which slowly expanded till by the beginning of the 1770s seven thousand bales of cotton were imported annually, and pressure was put on Parliament, by the new mill owners, to remove the prohibition on the production and sale of pure cotton cloth, as they wished to compete with the EIC for the British cotton market.

The acts were repealed in 1774, triggering a wave of investment in mill based cotton spinning and production, doubling the demand for raw cotton within a couple of years, and doubling it again every decade, till the 1840s. According to the Indian historian Prasannan Parthasarathi, mechanisation and the factory system allowed the British cotton producers "to out-produce not just the quantity, but the quality of Indian textiles", while the textile work in England was paid with a higher salary than that paid in India.

== Acts ==
- 1685 – 10% tariff on import of East Indian goods
- 1690 – The Impost of 1690 - upon East India Goods, wrought silk, and other foreign commodities, in all 55 in number - 20% tariff on import of East Indian goods
- 1700 (11 Will. 3)- An act for the more effectual employing the poor, by encouraging the Manufacturers of this Kingdom. - banned most imports
  - "that from Michaelmas 1701, all wrought silks, Bengals and stuffs, mixed with silk or herba, of the manufacture of Persia, China or East India; and also all printed calicoes, and all painted, dyed or stained there, shall be locked up in warehouses appointed by the commissioners of the customs, till re-exported; so none of the said goods should be worn or used, in either apparel or furniture, in England, on forfeiture thereof, and also of two hundred pound penalty on th persons having or selling any of them"
- 1700 - 15% duty on Muslins, a duty on East India Goods, laid on in.
- 1700 - export duty on English woolen produce abolished.
- 1707 - 50% tariff on Indian goods
- 1721 - Calico Act - banned the sale of most cotton textiles.
  - "An Act to Preserve and Encourage the Woollen and Silk Manufactures of this Kingdom, and for more Effectual Employing the Poor, by Prohibiting the Use and Wear of all Printed, Painted, Stained or Dyed Callicoes in Apparel, Household Stuff, Furniture, or otherwise, after the twenty fifth Day of December one thousand seven hundred and twenty two"
- 1730s - modified, with an exemption to the sale of British printed fabrics
- 1774 - repealed

== Subsequent developments ==
The whole of both act were repealed by section 1 of, and the schedule to, the Statute Law Revision Act 1867 (30 & 31 Vict. c. 59), which came into force on 15 July 1867.

== Bibliography ==
- Woodruff Smith, Consumption and the Making of Respectability, 1600–1800
