= Factory system =

Method of manufacturing using machinery and division of labor

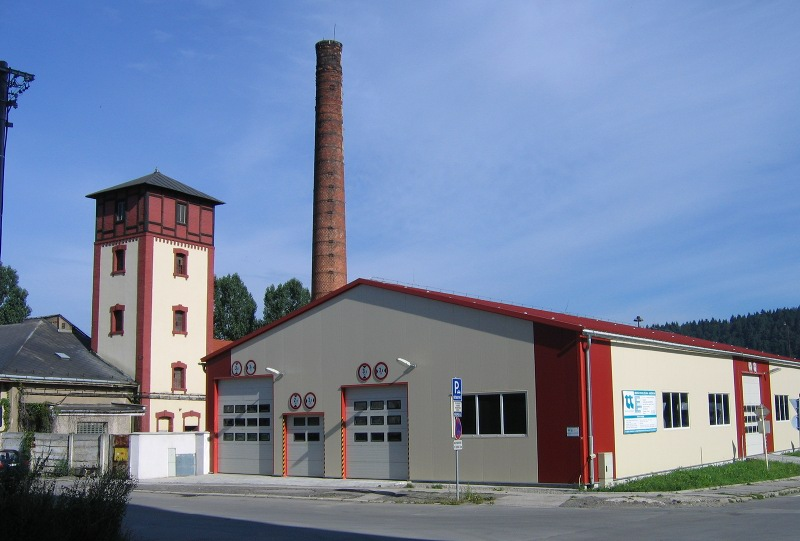
Reconstructed historical factory in Žilina (Slovakia) for production of safety matches. Originally built in 1915 for the firm Wittenberg and Son.

The factory system is a method of manufacturing whereby workers and manufacturing equipment are centralized in a factory, the work is supervised and structured through a division of labor, and the manufacturing process is mechanized. Because of the high capital cost of machinery and factory buildings, factories are typically privately owned by wealthy individuals or corporations who employ the operative labor. Use of machinery with the division of labor reduced the required skill-level of workers and also increased the output per worker.

The factory system was first adopted by successive entrepreneurs in Britain at the beginning of the Industrial Revolution in the late eighteenth century and later spread around the world. It replaced the putting-out system (domestic system). The main characteristic of the factory system is the use of machinery, originally powered by water or steam and later by electricity. Other characteristics of the system mostly derive from the use of machinery or economies of scale, the centralization of factories, and standardization of interchangeable parts.

== Characteristics ==
The defining characteristics of the factory system are:

- The factory system is considered by economists a form of production. The operative labour generally does not own a significant share of the enterprise. Under capitalism, capitalist owners provide all machinery, buildings, management, administration, and raw or semi-finished materials; and are responsible for the sale of all production, as well as for any resulting losses.
- Use of unskilled labour – Before the rise of factories, some systems had many products (such as shoes or muskets) made by skilled craftsmen who usually custom-made an entire article. In contrast, factories practiced division of labour, in which most workers were either low-skilled labourers who tended or operated machinery, or unskilled labourers who moved materials, semi-finished and finished goods. There were a few skilled mechanics. Division of labour was also practiced by the putting-out system in which, for example, pieces of leather were cut off-site and brought to a central shop to be made into shoes or other articles.
- Economies of scale – Factories produced products on a much larger scale than the putting-out or crafts systems. Because factories could oversupply local markets, access to transportation was important so that goods could be widely distributed. Factories used far less manpower per unit of production and therefore lowered product cost.
- Location – Before the widespread use of steam engines and railroads, most factories were located at water-power sites and near water transportation. Railroads became widespread (itself a consequence of steam power becoming more efficient and affordable), so factories could be located away from water-power sites but nearer railroads.
- Centralization – The cost and complexity of machinery, especially that powered by water or steam, was more than cottage-industry workers could afford or had the skills to maintain. The exception was the sewing machine, which allowed putting out of sewing to continue for decades after the rise of factories. Home spinning and weaving were displaced in the years following the introduction of factory production, especially as distribution became easier.

Workers and machines were brought together in a central factory complex specially designed to handle the machinery and flow of materials. Although the earliest factories were usually all under one roof, different operations might be done on different floors. (Multi-story buildings were common because they facilitated transmission of power through line shafts.) In large factories, such as Baldwin locomotive works, different processes were performed in different buildings.
Foundry and blacksmith operations were normally kept in a separate building for reasons of safety, cleanliness and health.
The efficiency of steam engines increases with size. Because of this, the smallest steam engines were about 2 horsepower, which was larger than needed by most workshops. Consequently, until electrification in the 1910s and 1920s, most workshops relied on manual power or rented space in power buildings which provided a centrally-powered line shaft.

- Standardization and uniformity – Components were made to standard specifications, such as soles, heels and uppers for shoes themselves made to uniform sizes. Uniformity was mainly due to the precision possible from machinery, but also, quality was overseen by management. The quality of many machine operations such as sewing was superior to hand methods. Near the end of the nineteenth century metal interchangeable parts became widely used.
- Guarantee of supply – Factories were able to produce and distribute a steady supply of goods.

Workers were paid either daily wages or for piece work, either in the form of money or some combination of money, housing, meals and goods from a company store (the truck system). Piece work presented accounting difficulties, especially as volumes increased and workers did a narrower scope of work on each piece. Piece work went out of favour with the advent of the production line, which was designed by factory staff on standard times for each operation in the sequence, and workers had to keep up with the work flow.

Critics of the factory system have associated it with the other example of bulk human-labour organisation of its era—slavery.

== History ==
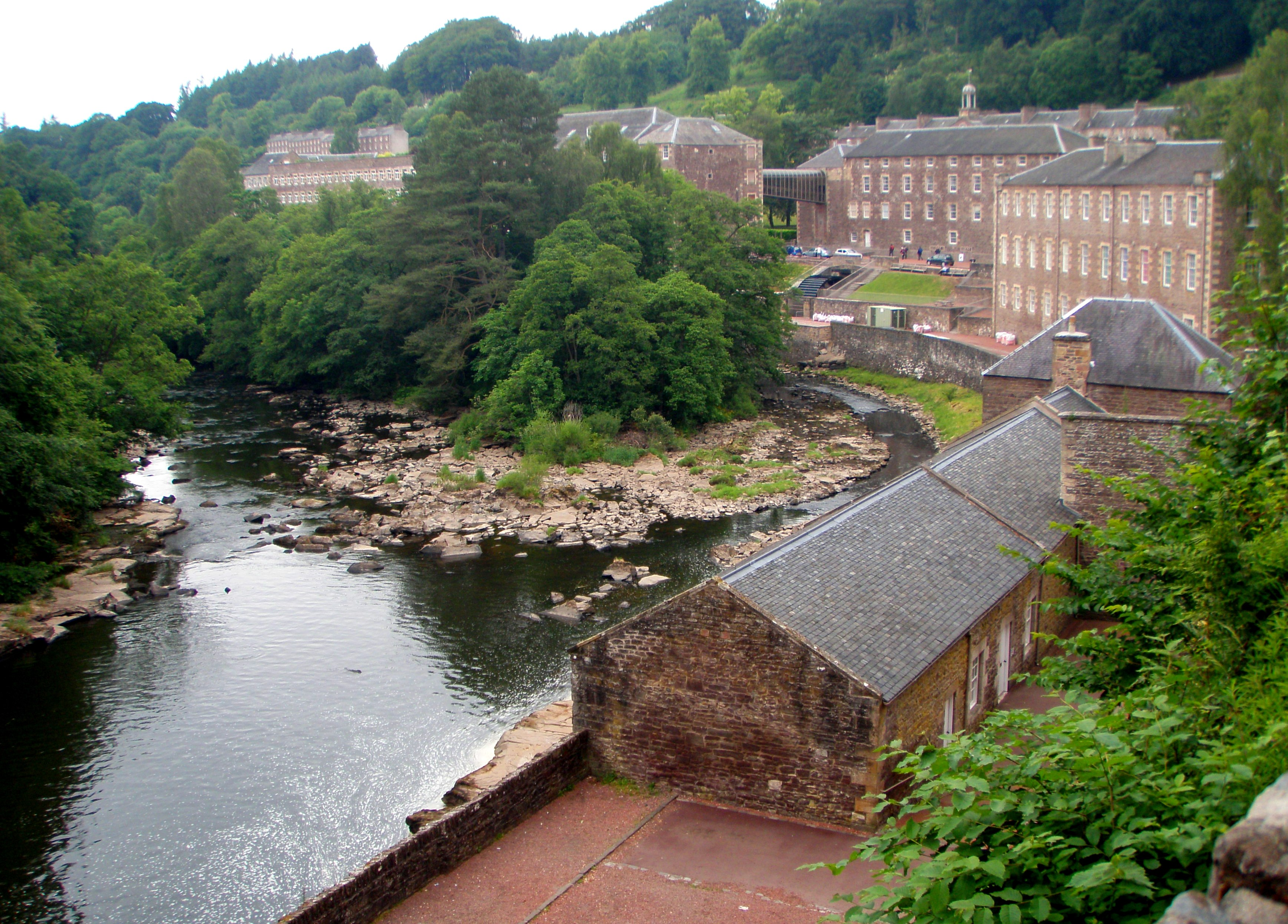
New Lanark mill

=== Antiquity ===
In Ancient Sumer around 3000 BC, the Ancient Mesopotamian economy began to develop a version of the factory system that also featured the division of labour.

=== Mills ===
One of the earliest factories was John Lombe's water-powered silk mill at Derby, operational by 1721. By 1746, an integrated brass mill was working at Warmley near Bristol. Raw material went in at one end, was smelted into brass and was turned into pans, pins, wire, and other goods. Housing was provided for workers on site. Other prominent early industrialists who adopted the factory system included Josiah Wedgwood (1730–1795) in Staffordshire and Matthew Boulton (1728–1809) at his Soho Manufactory (1766–1848).

=== Cotton spinning ===
The factory system began widespread use somewhat later when cotton-spinning was mechanized by a series of inventors.

The first use of an integrated system, where cotton came in and was spun, bleached, dyed and woven into finished cloth, was at mills in Waltham and Lowell, Massachusetts. These became known as Lowell Mills and the Waltham-Lowell system.

The Nasmyth, Gaskell and Company's Bridgewater Foundry, which began operation in 1836, was one of the earliest factories to use modern materials-handling such as cranes and rail-tracks through the buildings for handling heavy items.

=== Arkwright ===
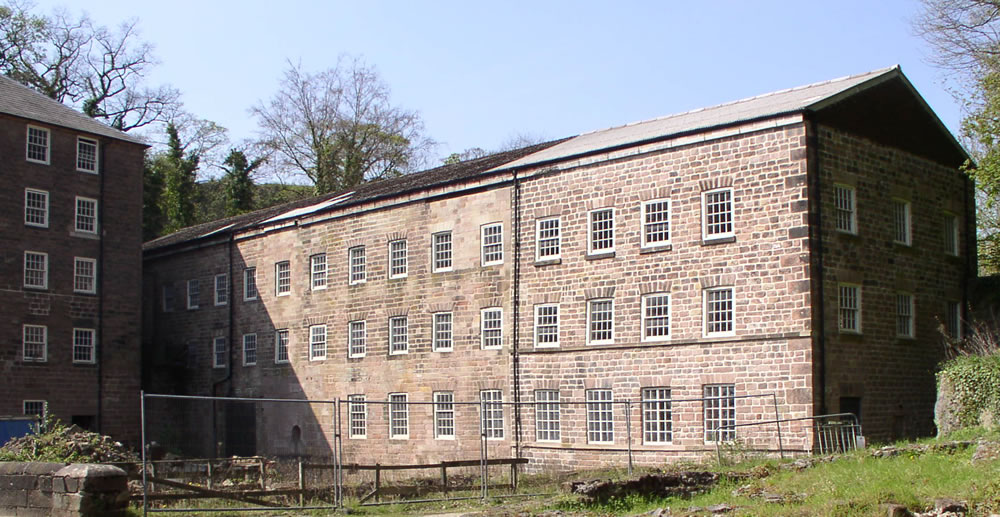
Cromford Mill as it is today

Richard Arkwright (1732–1792) patented his water frame in 1769, a major breakthrough in powering textile machinery. He established Cromford Mill, in Derbyshire, England. The factory system was a new way of organizing labour made necessary by the development of machines which were too large to house in a worker's cottage. Working hours were as long as they had been for the farmer, that is, from dawn to dusk, six days per week.

=== Machine tools and interchangeable parts ===
An early instance of transition from skilled craftsmen to machine tools began in the late eighteenth century. In 1774, John Wilkinson invented a method for boring cannon-barrels that were straight and true every time. He adapted this method to bore piston cylinders in the steam engines of James Watt. This boring machine was "probably the first metal-cutting tool capable of doing large work with anything like modern accuracy."

Mass production using interchangeable parts was first achieved in 1803 by Marc Isambard Brunel in cooperation with Henry Maudslay and Simon Goodrich, under the management of (with contributions by) Brigadier-General Sir Samuel Bentham, the Inspector General of Naval Works at Portsmouth Block Mills at Portsmouth Dockyard, for the British Royal Navy during the Napoleonic Wars. By 1808 annual production had reached 130,000 sailing blocks. This method of working did not catch on in general manufacturing in Britain for many decades, and when it did it was imported from America, becoming known as the American system of manufacturing, even though it had originated in England.

== Societal effects ==
Much manufacturing in the 18th century was carried out in homes under the domestic or putting-out system, especially the weaving of cloth and the spinning of thread and yarn, often with just a single loom or spinning wheel. As these devices were mechanized, machine-made goods were able to underprice the cottagers, leaving them unable to earn enough to make their effort worthwhile. Other products such as nails had long been produced in factory workshops, increasingly diversified using the division of labour to increase the efficiency of the system.

Factory workers typically lived within walking distance to work until the introduction of bicycles and electric street-railways in the 1890s. Thus the factory system was partly responsible for the rise of urban living, as large numbers of workers migrated into the towns in search of employment in the factories. Many mills had to provide dormitories for workers, especially for girls and women.

The transition to industrialisation was not without difficulty. For example, a group of English workers known as Luddites formed in the 1810s to protest against industrialisation and sometimes sabotaged factories. They continued an already-established tradition of workers opposing labour-saving machinery. Numerous inventors in the textile industry such as John Kay (fl. 1767) and Samuel Crompton (1753–1827), suffered harassment when developing their machines or devices.

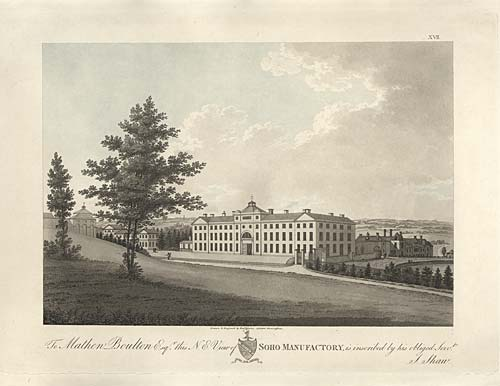
The Soho Manufactory in 1800

In other industries the transition to factory production was gradual.

Until the late nineteenth century it was common to work 12 hours a day, six days a week in most factories; however tenant farmers also worked long hours.

Debate arose concerning the morality of the system, as workers complained about unfair working conditions prior to the passage of labour laws. One of the problems was women's labour; in many cases women were paid not much more than a quarter of what men made. Child labour also became a major part of the system. However, in the early nineteenth century, education was not compulsory and in many families having children work was necessary due to low incomes (Samuel Slater (1768–1835) employed children but was required to provide basic education). Children commonly did farm labour and produced goods for the household. Besides working in factories, children worked in mines. Automation in the late 19th century is credited with displacing child labour, with the automatic glass-bottle blowing machine (c. 1890) cited by some as an example, having been said to have done more to end child labour than child-labour laws. Years of schooling began to increase sharply from the end of the nineteenth century.

Some industrialists themselves tried to improve factory -and living-conditions for their workers. One of the earliest such reformers, Robert Owen (1771–1858), became known for his pioneering efforts in improving conditions for workers at the New Lanark mills, and is often regarded as one of the key thinkers of the early socialist movement.

Karl Marx worried that the capitalist system would eventually lead to wages only sufficient for subsistence due to the tendency of the rate of profit to fall. Subsistence wages were indeed the case in parts of England. The British Agricultural Revolution had been reducing the need for labour on farms for over a century and farm workers were forced to sell their labour wherever they could. Conditions became particularly bad during the depression years of the late 1830s to early 1840s. The depression was immediately followed by the Irish famine of 1845–1850, which brought large numbers of Irish immigrants to seek work in the English and American factories.

One of the best-known accounts of factory workers' living conditions during the Industrial Revolution is Friedrich Engels' The Condition of the Working Class in England in 1844. By the late 1880s, Engels noted that the extreme poverty and lack of sanitation he wrote about in 1844 had largely disappeared.

== See also ==
- Adam Smith
- Arnold Toynbee (historian, born 1852)
- Assembly line
- Mass production
- Mechanization
- Productivity-improving technologies
- Urban manufacturing
