= Philippe de Girard =

French engineer and inventor

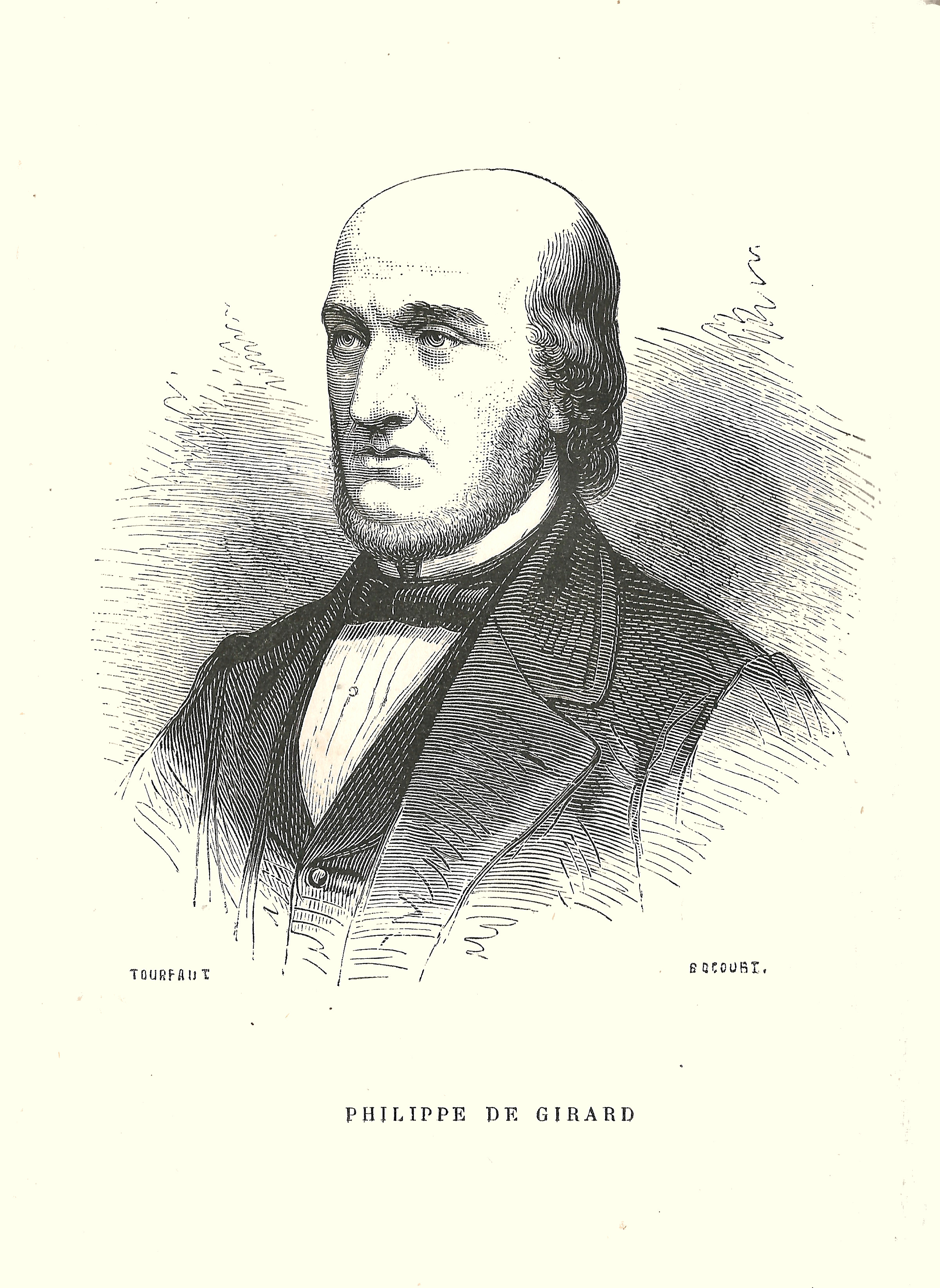
Philippe de Girard

Philippe Henri de Girard (February 1, 1775 – August 26, 1845) was a French engineer and inventor of the first flax spinning frame in 1810, and the person after whom the town of Żyrardów in Poland was named. He was also the uncredited inventor of food preservation using tin cans.

== Biography ==
Girard was born in the village of Lourmarin in the département of Vaucluse, France, to a wealthy aristocratic family. As a child, he was sent by his parents to some of the most notable French schools of the era. However, in the effect of the French Revolution, his family was forced to flee France and young Philippe had to abandon his studies in order to help his family earn money for living.

In May 1810 Napoleon I tried to stop English cotton fabrics from entering the continent of Europe and offered a reward of one million francs to any inventor who could devise the best machinery for the spinning of flax yarn. After only a short period Philippe de Girard took out a French patent for important inventions for both dry and wet methods of spinning flax. He was not awarded the prize money and failed to gain the recognition he felt was deserved. He had been counting on the prize money to pay the expenses of his invention, and he got into serious financial difficulties. So he accepted, when in 1815 he was invited by the Austrian government to establish a spinning mill in Hirtenberg near Vienna, which employed his spinning frames. However, it failed to prove a commercial success.

In 1817 Girard returned to France with a prototype of his spinning machinery ready, but the internal situation of France after the fall of Napoleon Bonaparte prevented the new French authorities from payment of the debts and eventually, Girard sold his patent to England. His inventions were patented in England in 1814, by Horace Hall (possibly a pseudonym). It would not have been easy for a French man to introduce a new development into England at this point in history. It never really caught on.

In the British Isles James Kay was initially credited with the invention. Although, on December 2, 1826, shortly after Kay’s patent was awarded, Girard seems to have been prompted to write to the editor of The Manchester Guardian complaining about this and pointing out he had been the inventor. A court invalidated Kay's patent in 1839, stating it was too similar to Horace Hall's, a decision upheld on appeal in 1841. The fact that Horace Hall made no complaint might suggest this name being a pseudonym.

Several years afterward the situation in France improved and Girard started the first modern textile factory in Lille. Initially the business was a failure and Girard almost went bankrupt.

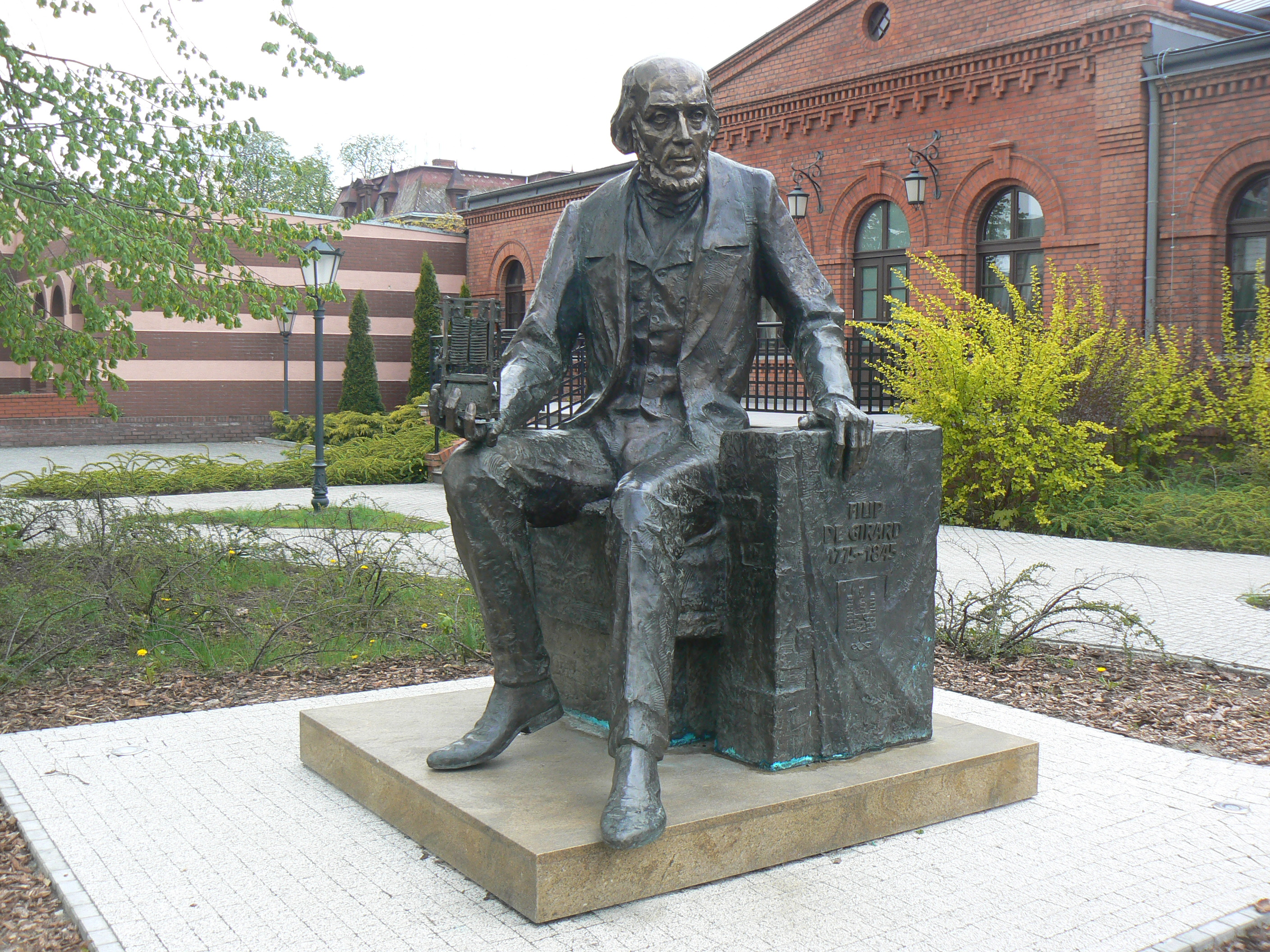
The statue of Philippe de Girard in Żyrardów

In 1825, through an old army connection, baron Piotr Galichet, who had settled in Poland, he was hired by the government of the Kingdom of Poland to help develop a Polish textile industry. He became consultant to the Polish government, as well as the Bank Polski. Because of the financial support of the latter, in 1831 he organized the first major factory of his project in Marymont near Warsaw. Two years later he was invited by relatives of Galichet, the Łubieński brothers with his business to their estate at Ruda Guzowska, where the factory had better prospects. Soon it became a great success and brought fame and prosperity both to the settlement and to Girard. In honour of Girard, Ruda Guzowska was renamed Żyrardów, a toponym derived of the polonised spelling of Girard's name.

In 1844 Girard returned to France, where he planned to open more factories. However, he died the following year. Apart from the town of Żyrardów (currently one of the biggest satellite towns of Warsaw), Girard had a street and a college in 18th arrondissement of Paris named after him and two secondary schools, one in Żyrardów, the other in Avignon.

After his death in Paris, his work was recognised and his descendants were rewarded with a small pension by the French Emperor.

== Other projects ==
In 1806 he exhibited an improvement to oil lamps, and in the same year made some improvement to the steam engine, producing a rotary motion without a walking beam. In 1814 he constructed a steam machine gun that was written about in several French publications between then and 1824. The gun used six barrels that were fed by hoppers and was said to achieve a firing rate of about 180 rounds per minute. In 1818 he built a Steamship to run on the Danube.
