= James Hargreaves =

English inventor of the Spinning Jenny

- Born: 13 December 1720; Oswaldtwistle, Lancashire, England
- Died: 22 April 1778 (aged 57); Nottingham, England, Great Britain
- Resting place: St Mary’s churchyard, Nottingham
- Occupations: Weaver, Carpenter, Inventor
- Known for: Spinning jenny
- Height: 5'10
- Spouse: Elizabeth Grimshaw (m. 1740)
- Children: 13

James Hargreaves (c. 1720 – 22 April 1778) was an English weaver, carpenter and inventor who lived and worked in Lancashire, England. Hargreaves is credited with inventing the spinning jenny in 1764.

He was one of three men responsible for the mechanisation of spinning: Richard Arkwright patented the water frame in 1769 and Samuel Crompton combined the two, creating the spinning mule in 1779.

== Life and work ==
James Hargreaves was born at Stanhill, Oswaldtwistle in Lancashire. He was described as a "stout, broad-set man of about five-foot ten, or rather more". He was illiterate and worked as a hand loom weaver during most of his life. He married and baptismal records show he had 13 children, of whom the author Baines in 1835 was aware of '6 or 7'.

== Spinning jenny ==
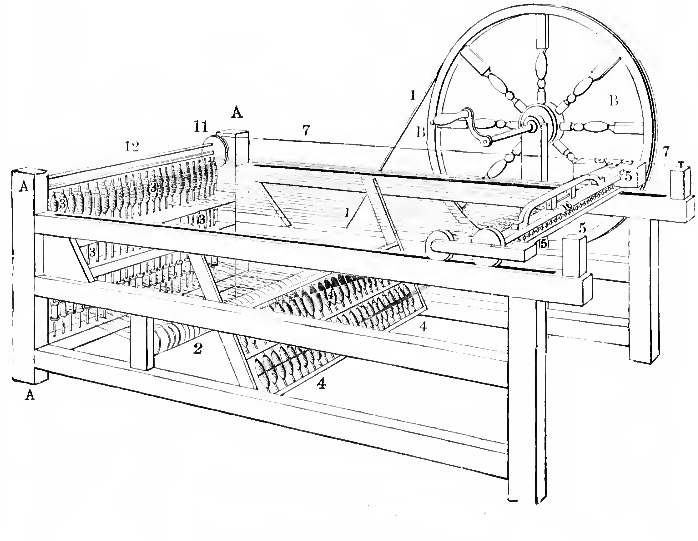
The improved spinning jenny that was used in textile mills

Model of the spinning jenny in a museum in Wuppertal, Germany

The spinning Jenny was invented in 1764-1765. The idea for the spinning jenny is said to have come when a one-thread spinning wheel was overturned on the floor, and Hargreaves saw both the wheel and the spindle continuing to revolve. He realized that if several spindles were placed upright and side by side, several threads might be spun at once. The spinning jenny was confined to producing cotton weft threads and was unable to produce yarn of sufficient quality for the warp. A high-quality warp was later supplied by Arkwright's spinning frame.

Hargreaves built a jenny for himself and sold several of them to his neighbours. His invention was initially welcomed by other hand spinners until they saw a fall in the price of yarn.

Opposition to the machine caused Hargreaves to leave for Nottingham, where the cotton hosiery industry benefited from the increased provision of suitable yarn. In Nottingham Hargreaves made jennies for a man named Shipley, and on 12 June 1770, he was granted a patent, which provided the basis for legal action (later withdrawn) against the Lancashire manufacturers who had begun using it. With a partner, Thomas James, Hargreaves ran a small mill in Hockley and lived in an adjacent house. The business was carried on until he died in 1778 when his wife received a payment of £400.

== Legacy ==
When Samuel Crompton invented the spinning mule in c.1779, he stated he had learned to spin in 1769 on a jenny that Hargreaves had built.

Hargreaves was one of three men responsible for the mechanisation of spinning.

== Dispute over Hargreaves' contribution ==
False claims were being made about Hargreaves as early as 1828, when Richard Guest, writing in the Edinburgh Review in 1828, introduced several errors, and a distorted view of his life and contributions has persisted ever since. Parish burial records show that Hargreaves (misspelt as "Hargraves") did not die in the workhouse, as had been claimed.

A ferocious legal battle had been mounted in the 1780s to have Richard Arkwright's most important patents annulled. Thomas Highs had claimed that he was the true inventor of both the spinning frame and the spinning jenny. Conflicting evidence as to the circumstances of several inventions was canvassed, and although Arkwright's patents were annulled, the question of authorship was not settled. (Note: See Disputes over patents)

Other records show that neither Hargreaves's wife nor any of his daughters bore the name Jenny, contrary to a myth repeated in school textbooks as late as the 1960s, children's books as late as 2005 and on educational websites to the present day. (Note: e.g. Burchill S.A.) The 'jenny' refers to an engine, a common slang term in Lancashire in the 18th century, and encountered occasionally even now.

== Bibliography ==
- Hargraves Spinning Jenny – Confined to spinning weft
- Deutsches Museum (Auf Deutsch) Secondary source.
- Baines, Edward (1835). History of the cotton manufacture in Great Britain;. London: H. Fisher, R. Fisher, and P. Jackson.
- Nasmith, Joseph (1895). Recent Cotton Mill Construction and Engineering (Elibron Classics ed.). London: John Heywood. ISBN 978-1-4021-4558-2.
- Marsden, Richard (1884). Cotton Spinning: its development, principles an practice. George Bell and Sons 1903.
- Guest, Richard (1828). The British Cotton Manufactures: and a Reply to an Article on the Spinning Contained in a Recent Number of the Edinburgh Review. London: E. Thomson & Sons and W. & W. Clarke and Longman, Rees, & Co.
- Timmins, Geoffrey (1996). Four Centuries of Lancashire Cotton. Preston: Lancashire County Books. ISBN 978-1-871236-41-5.
