= Richard Arkwright =

English inventor and entrepreneur (1732–1792)

Sir Richard Arkwright
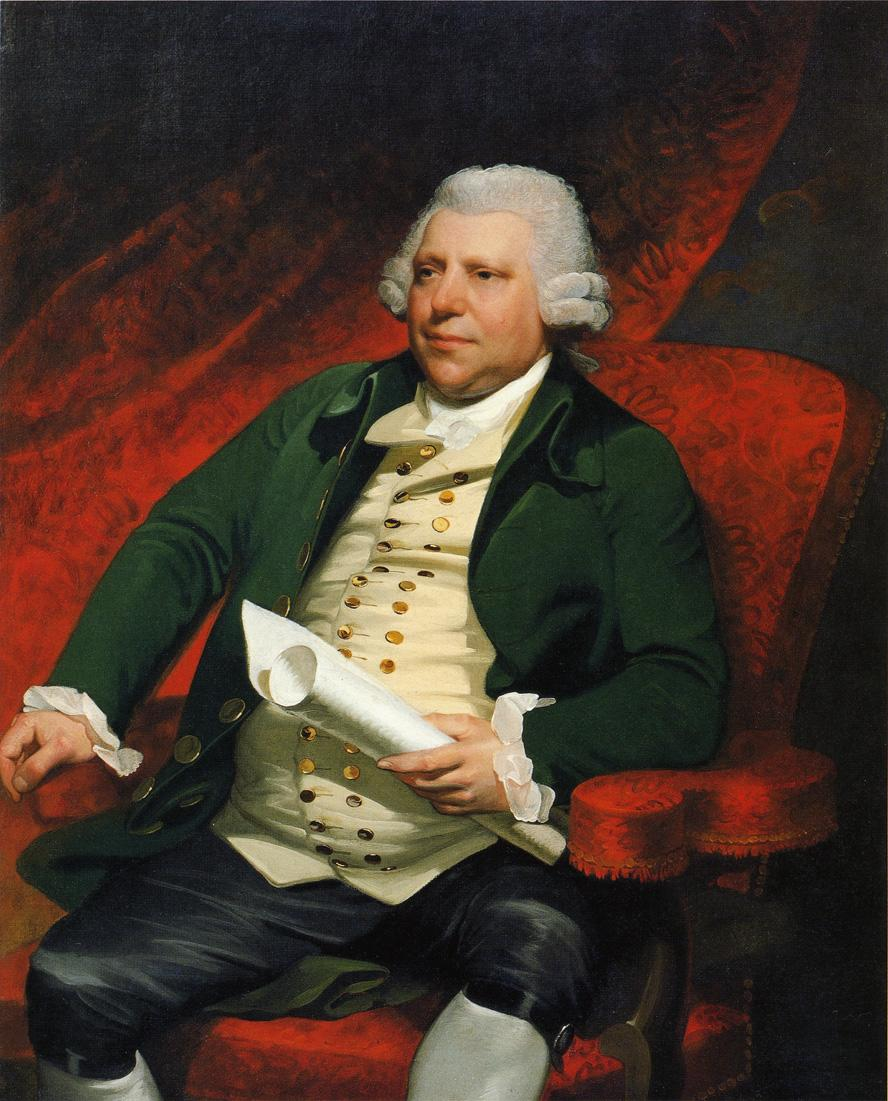
- Portrait of Richard Arkwright, oil on canvas, by Mather Brown, 1790. New Britain Museum of American Art, Connecticut.
- Born: 23 December 1732; Preston, Lancashire, England
- Died: 3 August 1792 (aged 59); Cromford, Derbyshire, England
- Title: Sir Richard Arkwright
- Spouses: Patience Holt, Margaret Biggins
- Children: Richard Arkwright junior, Susannah Arkwright

Signature
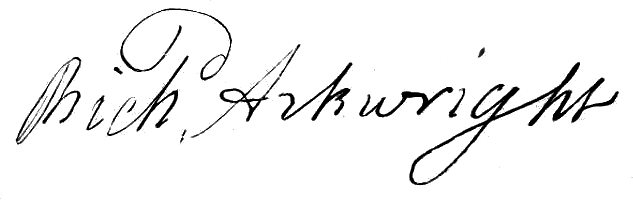

Sir Richard Arkwright (23 December 1732 – 3 August 1792) was an English inventor and a leading entrepreneur during the early Industrial Revolution. He is credited as the driving force behind the development of the spinning frame, known as the water frame after it was adapted to use water power; and he patented a rotary carding engine to convert raw cotton to 'cotton lap' prior to spinning. He was the first to develop factories housing both mechanised carding and spinning operations. (Note: Samuel Crompton was later to combine the two in his spinning mule.)

Arkwright's achievement was to combine power, machinery, semi-skilled labour and the new raw material of cotton to create mass-produced yarn. His organisational skills earned him the accolade "father of the modern industrial factory system," notably through the methods developed in his mill at Cromford, Derbyshire (now preserved as part of the Derwent Valley Mills World Heritage Site).

== Life and family ==
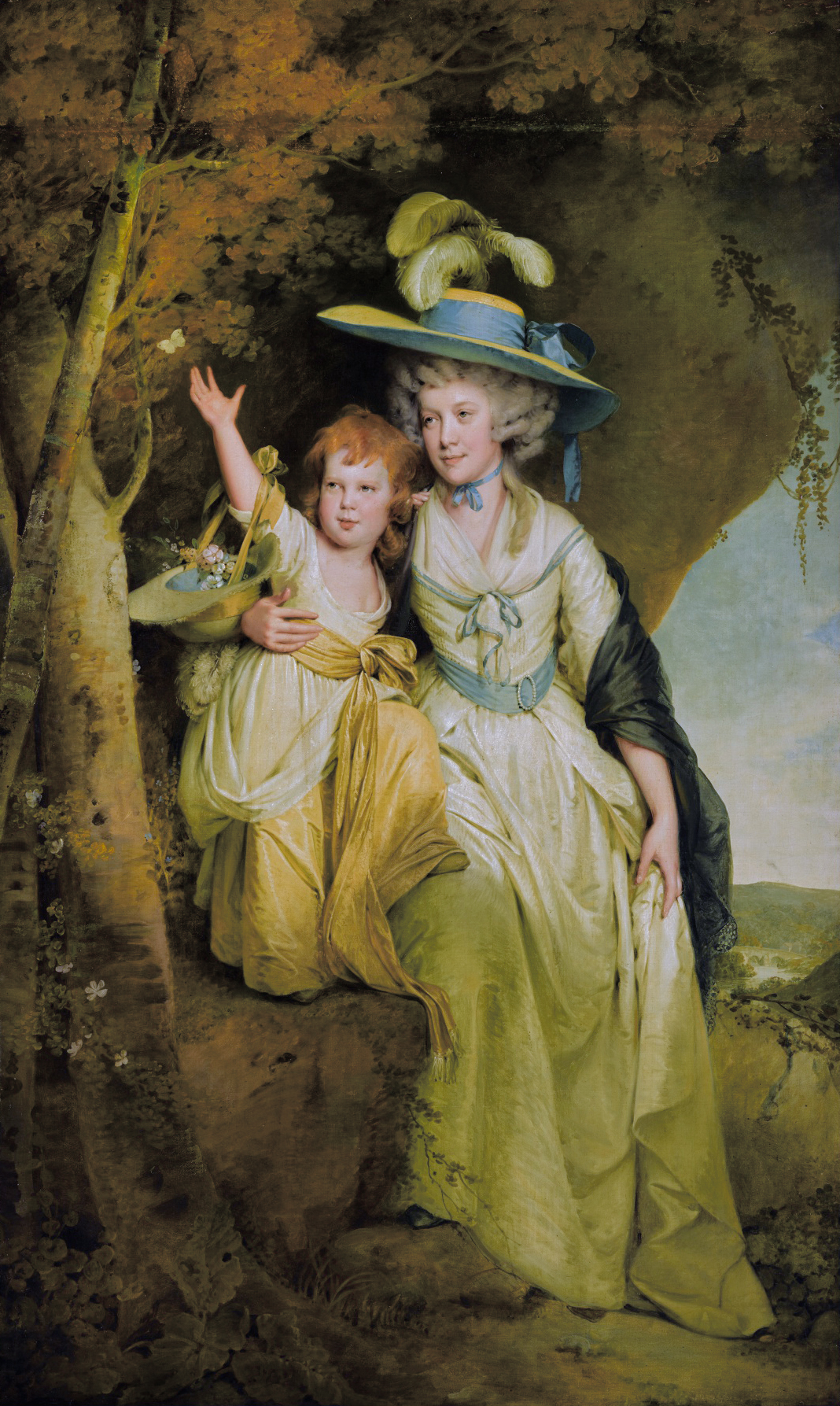
Susannah Arkwright, Mrs Charles Hurt (1762–1835), and her daughter Mary Anne (painting by Joseph Wright of Derby)

Richard Arkwright was born in Preston, Lancashire, England on 23 December 1732, the youngest of seven surviving children. His father, Thomas, was a tailor and a Preston Guild burgess. Richard's parents, Sarah and Thomas, could not afford to send him to school and instead arranged for him to be taught to read and write by his cousin Ellen. He was apprenticed to a Mr Nicholson, a barber at the nearby town of Kirkham, and began his working life as a barber and wig-maker, setting up a shop at Churchgate in Bolton in the early 1760s. It was here that he invented a waterproof dye for use on the fashionable periwigs of the time, the income from which later funded his prototype cotton machinery.

Arkwright married his first wife, Patience Holt, in 1755. They had a son, Richard Arkwright Junior, who was born the same year. Patience died in 1756, and then in 1761 Arkwright, aged 29, married Margaret Biggins. They had three children, of whom only Susannah survived to adulthood. At some time after the death of his first wife, Arkwright became interested in the development of carding and spinning machinery to replace hand labour in the conversion of raw cotton to thread for weaving.

=== Spinning frame ===
In 1768, Arkwright and John Kay, a clockmaker, returned to Preston, renting rooms in a house on Stoneygate (now called Arkwright House), where they worked on a spinning machine. In 1769 Arkwright patented the spinning frame, a machine which produced twisted threads (initially for warps only), using wooden and metal cylinders rather than human fingers. This machine, initially powered by horses (see below), greatly reduced the cost of cotton-spinning, and would lead to major changes in the textile industry.

=== Carding engine ===
Lewis Paul had invented a machine for carding in 1748. Arkwright made improvements to this machine and in 1775 took out a patent for a new carding engine, which converted raw cotton to a continuous skein prior to spinning. The machine used a succession of uneven rollers rotating at increasingly higher speeds to draw out the roving, before applying a twist via a bobbin-and-flyer mechanism. It could make cotton thread thin and strong enough for the warp threads of cloth.

=== Cromford Mill ===
Arkwright and John Smalley of Preston set up a small horse-driven factory at Nottingham. To obtain capital for expansion, Arkwright formed a partnership with Jedediah Strutt and Samuel Need, wealthy nonconformist hosiery manufacturers. In 1771, the partners built the world's first water-powered mill at Cromford, which covered both carding and spinning operations and employed 200 people.

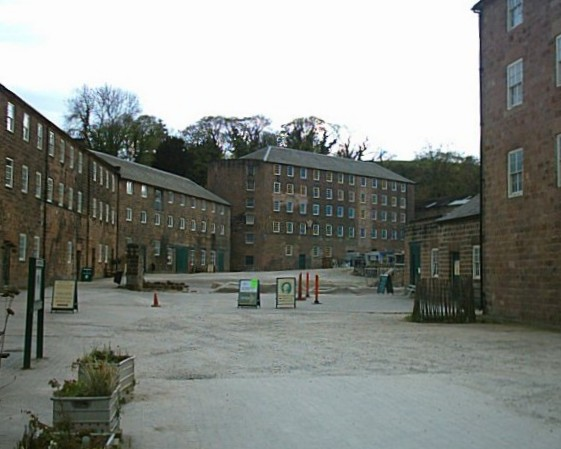
Arkwright's mill at Cromford

In 1776 Arkwright built a second, larger mill at Cromford and, soon afterwards, mills at Bakewell, Wirksworth and elsewhere (see below). His success as a businessman and innovator was widely recognized in his own time. The spinning frame was a large advance over Hargreaves's spinning jenny, in that very little training was required to operate the machinery, which produced a strong yarn suitable for warp threads.

=== Grand Patent ===
To strengthen his position in relation to his many competitors and emulators, Arkwright obtained a "grand patent" in 1775, which he hoped would consolidate his position within the fast-growing cotton industry. Public opinion, however, was bitterly hostile to exclusive patents, and in 1781 Arkwright initiated legal proceedings to assert his rights. The case dragged on in court until 1785, when it was finally settled against him on the grounds that his specifications were deficient: the court had also heard assertions that the spinning frame was actually the invention of Arkwright's employee John Kay, or of Thomas Highs, Kay's previous employer.

=== Factories and the factory system ===
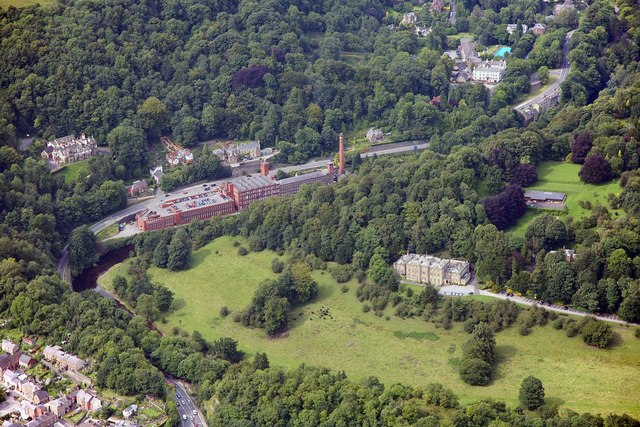
Masson Mill on the River Derwent, and Arkwright's house Willersley Castle, completed only after his death.

With the expansion of the mill at Cromford, it soon became apparent that the existing population of the town would be inadequate to provide the labour needed for the scale of operations which Arkwright was planning. He therefore brought in workers from outside the locality, building a cluster of cottages near the mill to house them (he also built the Greyhound public house, which still stands in Cromford market square). Stuart Fisher states that the workers' homes are now considered to be "the first factory housing development in the world".

Arkwright instigated novel and highly disciplined working arrangements at Cromford. Work was organised in two 13-hour shifts per day, including an overlap for the change of shift. Bells rang at 5 am and 5 pm and the gates were shut precisely at 6 am and 6 p.m.: anyone who was late was excluded from work for the rest of the day and lost an extra day's pay. Arkwright encouraged weavers with large families to move to Cromford. Whole families were employed, including large numbers of children as young as seven (subsequently increased to ten); and towards the end of his tenure, nearly two-thirds of the 1,150 employees were children. He allowed employees a week's holiday a year, on condition that they did not travel beyond the town.

After establishing the mill at Cromford, Arkwright returned to Lancashire and took up a lease of the Birkacre mill at Chorley, which was to become a catalyst for the town's growth into one of the most important industrialised towns of the Industrial Revolution. In 1777 Arkwright leased the Haarlem Mill in Wirksworth, Derbyshire, where he installed the first steam engine to be used in a cotton mill (this was used to replenish the millpond that drove the mill's waterwheel rather than to drive the machinery directly). He was invited to Scotland, where he assisted David Dale in establishing cotton mills at New Lanark. A large mill of Arkwright's at Birkacre in Lancashire, was destroyed in the anti-machinery riots of 1779.

=== Later life ===
Aggressive and self-sufficient, Arkwright was a difficult man to work with. He bought out all his partners and went on to build factories at Manchester, Matlock Bath, New Lanark (in partnership with David Dale) and elsewhere. He was a member of the Church of England, unlike many entrepreneurs of the time, who were often nonconformist.

Arkwright served as High Sheriff of Derbyshire and was knighted in 1786.

He also built Willersley Castle, now a Grade II* listed building, in 1791; after a fire in 1792, it was rebuilt and occupied by his son Richard Arkwright junior starting in 1796. Arkwright died at Rock House, Cromford, on 3 August 1792, aged 59, leaving a fortune of £500,000 (£63,049,213.31 as of 2025)

He was buried at St Giles' Church, Matlock. His remains were later moved to the family chapel near the castle, now St Mary's Church, Cromford.

== Memorials ==
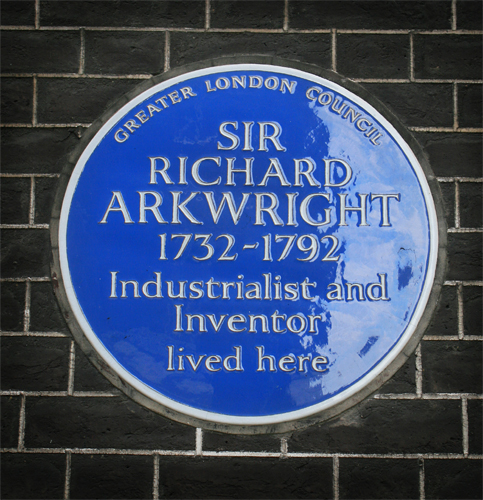
Blue plaque marking the occupancy by Arkwright in Adam Street, London

- Richard Arkwright's barber shop in Churchgate, Bolton was demolished early in the 20th century. There is a small plaque above the door of the building that replaced it, recording Arkwright's occupancy.
- A Greater London Council blue plaque unveiled in 1984 commemorates Arkwright at 8 Adam Street in Charing Cross, London.
- Arkwright lived at Rock House in Cromford, opposite his original mill. In 1788 he purchased an estate from William Nightingale (the father of Florence Nightingale), for £20,000 and set about building Willersley Castle for himself and his family. However just as the building was completed it was destroyed by fire, and Arkwright was forced to wait a further two years whilst it was rebuilt. He died aged 59 in 1792, never having lived in the castle, which was completed only after his death. After being a hotel owned by the Christian Guild company, Willersley Castle now belongs to outdoor adventure education company Manor Adventure.
- The Arkwright Society, set up after the bicentenary of Cromford Mill, owns the mill complex and has worked to restore it. Derwent Valley Mills, including this site, was declared by Historic England as "one of the country's 100 irreplaceable sites". It is also the centrepiece of the Derwent Valley Mills UNESCO World Heritage Site.
- The Arkwright Scholarships Trust was set up in the UK in 1991 in Arkwright's memory to give scholarships to aspiring future leaders in engineering and technical design. By 2014, the Trust was awarding approximately 400 scholarships annually to support students through their 'A' levels and Scottish Highers, and to assist young people undertaking higher-level apprenticeships and university engineering studies. It had awarded over 5,000 scholarships as of mid 2020.
