= Thomas Highs =

British textile engineer (1718–1803)

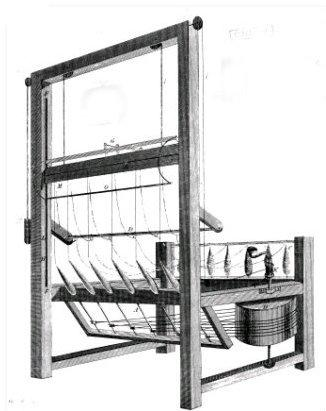
A drawing of Thomas Highs' spinning jenny, taken from Edward Baines's History of the Cotton Manufacture in Great Britain

Thomas Highs (1718–1803), of Leigh, Lancashire, was a reed-maker and manufacturer of cotton carding and spinning engines in the 1780s, during the Industrial Revolution. He is known for claiming patents on a spinning jenny (invented by James Hargreaves), a carding machine and the throstle (a machine for the continuous twisting and winding of wool).

== Life and work ==
Thomas Highs, sometimes spelled Thomas Hayes, was born in Leigh, Lancashire in 1718 and lived most of his life there. It is said he was a reed maker. The reed is a comb-like strip attached to the batten of a loom, which keeps the warp threads apart and helps the weaver pack the weft threads tightly on the newly-woven cloth.

He married Sarah Moss on 23 February 1747, at Leigh Parish Church. Five years after his marriage, he became interested in cotton-spinning machinery and between 1763 and 1764, he worked to produce a spinning engine with John Kay, a clockmaker, who was a close neighbour of his at the time. Between 1766 and 1767 he discovered the method of spinning by rollers similar to that patented by Lewis Paul and John Wyatt and employed John Kay to help him with the construction of the mechanism.

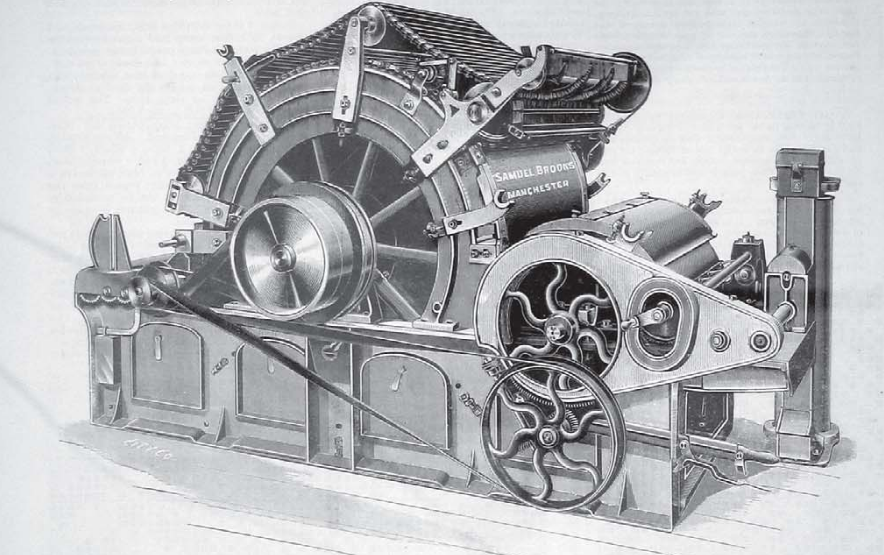
Early carding engine

It is undisputed that he invented a perpetual carding engine in 1773, and invented an improved double spinning jenny.

== Claim and counter claim ==
Richard Guest, claimed that Thomas Highs was the actual inventor of both Hargreaves' spinning jenny, and Arkwright's rollers, the feature of the water frame. This had been tested in court. Richard Guest firstly wrote 'A History of Cotton Manufacture' in 1823, this was partially quoted by the Baines in History of Lancashire, Vol 1 p118 Vol2 p134 and then by McCullough in the Edinburgh Review. Guest then self-published a 233-page book, 'The British Cotton Manufactures: and a Reply to an Article on the Spinning Contained in a Recent Number of the Edinburgh Review' that accused Baines and McCullough of plagiarism and asserted that Highs was indeed the inventor of both these items. Baines wrote 'History of the cotton manufacture in Great Britain'; it was published in 1835. He discusses Guest's conjecture in an extensive footnote, where he dismisses Richard Guest's claim.

These histories have been used during the intervening 170 years as sources for new definitive interpretations.

=== The Arkwright patent ===
In 1775 Arkwright patented a variety of machinery that performed all the processes of manufacture, from cleaning to carding to final spinning. In 1781, Arkwright went to court to protect his patents but the move rebounded when his patents were overturned. Four years later, after seeing his patents restored temporarily a court battle of 1785 in London made a determination.

Arkwright applied for at least 5 patents relating to spinning. They related to a feeder, a filleted cylinder, a roving can, the crank and comb and roller spinning. These patents were taken out in 1775 but were challenged in the courts on four counts : That the patent was prejudicial to His Majesties subject, they were not a new invention, they were not invented by Arkwright, and they were not sufficiently described. The July 1781 and February 1785 cases were based on intelligibility, not being sufficiently described but in June 1785 the argument of not being original was judged. Highs was a witness at the February 1785 trial, and in his evidence claimed he had made fluted rollers. No mention was made by him of the spinning jenny, but it was mentioned as a statement of fact in Arkwright's submission, that Hargreaves had invented it.

=== The allegation ===
It is alleged that Highs knew the jenny's limitations. It could produce only thread that was suitable for weft. Its output was too soft to be used for warp, which still had to be manufactured from linen. While Hargreaves worked on the spinning jenny, Highs, it is alleged, constructed a machine using rollers, similar to a machine later called the water frame. Whereas the jenny had stretched the thread by trapping it in a clove, a sort of wooden vice and pulling it out, the water frame achieved better results by passing the roving through two sets of gripping rollers. The second set were rotating at five times the speed of the first, so the thread was stretched to exactly five times its original length, before being given its vital twist by a bobbin and flyer. The machine produced stronger thread than the jenny. This thread that was suitable for warp. It is alleged that Highs gave clockmaker Kay a wooden model of his rollers and asked him to make a working metal version. Kay did so before returning to live a few miles away in his native Warrington.

Richard Arkwright met Kay on his business travels, gained his confidence, and over a drink in a public house persuaded him to hand over the secrets of Highs's machines. Arkwright, later Sir Richard Arkwright, developed a substantial fortune and reputation in the cotton industry from this invention, while Highs lived the rest of his life in obscurity before his death in 1803.

Highs, Kay, Kay's wife and the widow of James Hargreaves all testified that Arkwright had stolen their inventions. Arkwright's patents were laid aside, and this judgement was later interpreted to mean as he was not the inventor, then Highs must have been.

=== Timeline ===
Highs movements in between 1767 and his death in 1803 were detailed by Guest. He used them to show that Highs had been in close proximity to the acknowledged inventors, and from this made assumptions about High's role.

- About 1767 or 8, Highs moved to a house in Bradshawgate, Leigh, where he kept a special room to house his roller-frame in secret. Whilst living here, he constructed a jenny in which the spindles were placed in a circle, with the drum or wheel which he set up in an unoccupied house, next door to the Anchor public house, Market-street, Leigh. About 1769, he took some hanks of twist spun upon this new machine, to the Board of Trade, in Manchester, with a view to securing an investor to develop this new engine, but without success. Undaunted he removed from Leigh to Camp Street, Manchester, in 1770/71 where he constructed a double-jenny, which had twenty-eight spindles on each side, turned by a drum or roller, placed in the center. This machine was shown publicly in Manchester Exchange, in 1772, by his son, Thomas Highs, then about ten years of age, and the manufacturers, on that occasion, subscribed two hundred guineas, presenting them to Highs as a reward for his ingenuity.
- In 1772 he removed to Wilderspool farm, in Barton-upon-Irwell, and it was here he developed the carding-engine he had been working on for some time to make roving on a continuous scale to feed the raw material demands of the spinning machines.
- In 1773 he removed to Bolton-le-Moors, where he resided until 1776. It was here that he struck up a friendship with Samuel Crompton, who combined the roller-spinning frame with the spinning jenny, and by that means produced the spinning Mule. The accepted story is that Samuel Crompton of Bolton invented the spinning mule, which was a cross between the spinning jenny and the water frame, using the moving-carriage principle and the spindle-winding system of the earlier machine with the drafting rollers of the later one. Crompton claimed he had no knowledge of Arkwright's rollers and came upon the idea independently between 1772, when he began work, and 1779. It is known, however, that Highs - one of the very few men with intimate knowledge of both Jenny and Water Frame - lived in Bolton during that times, and was, in fact, a member of the same, tightly-knit Swedenborgian religious sect as Crompton.
- In 1776 he returned to Manchester, and lived at No. 6, Deansgate, opposite the Wool Pack. At this time Mr. Smith, a Manchester merchant, whose warehouse was in Hunter's lane, agreed to form a partnership with him and build a spinning factory in Yorkshire, which had a ready supply of water power. But just as arrangements were reaching a conclusion Mr. Smith was unfortunately drowned at Blackpool. After this disappointment, in 1777 Highs went to Nottingham to construct spinning-machines for Messrs. Stanfield & Hallam, or Bancroft & Hallam, and in 1778/79, he made machines at Kidderminster, for various manufacturers, among them, Messrs. Pardoe, Lea & Co.
- In 1780, he was in Ireland to manage the production machinery for spinning cotton yarn for Baron Hamilton, who was then building a factory on his estate at Balbriggan, Dublin. However, in 1785 he was urgently summoned as a witness against Sir Richard Arkwright at the famous 1785 patent trial, which Arkwright lost, and Highs never returned to Ireland.
- In 1781, he was back in Manchester, still making machines, until about the year 1790, when he suffered a stroke which debilitated him. He was rescued from destitution through the charity of William Drinkwater, a cotton spinner of Manchester, who clearly held him in high regard. He gave him a guinea per month, and five guineas every 24 June, and every 24 December, during his life, and when died, Drinkwater paid for a decent burial. Thomas Highs died on 13 December 1803, aged eighty-four years, and was buried in a vault belonging to the minister, in the New Jerusalem Chapel, Manchester.

== Bibliography ==
- Baines, Edward (1835). History of the cotton manufacture in Great Britain;. London: H. Fisher, R. Fisher, and P. Jackson.
- Joseph Nasmith:Recent cotton mill construction and engineering Publisher: John Heywood, London 1894 reprinted Elibron Classics|ISBN 1-4021-4558-6
- Marsden, Richard (1884). Cotton Spinning: its development, principles an practice. George Bell and Sons 1903.
- Guest, Richard (1828). The British Cotton Manufactures: and a Reply to an Article on the Spinning Contained in a Recent Number of the Edinburgh Review. London: E. Thomson & Sons and W. & W. Clarke and Longman, Rees, & Co.
