= John Kay (spinning frame) =

18th-century English inventor

John Kay was an English inventor best known for the development of the spinning frame in 1767, which marked an important stage in the development of textile manufacturing during the Industrial Revolution. Born in Warrington in Lancashire, England, Kay was at least the co-constructor of the first spinning frame, and was a claimant to having been its inventor. He is sometimes confused with the unrelated John Kay from Bury, Lancashire, who had invented the flying shuttle, a weaving machine, some thirty years earlier. (Note: For example, the MadeHow biography of Arkwright confuses the two, giving a date of death for the maker of the spinning-frame slightly before it was built.)

== John Kay and Thomas Highs ==
In 1763, Kay was working as a clockmaker in Leigh. A neighbour of his, Thomas Highs, was an inventor, and the two collaborated in investigations of machinery for the manufacture of textiles, including the spinning of thread by means of rollers. By 1763 weaving was already automated, but spinning was still done by hand. Lewis Paul had made a machine using mechanical rollers in 1738, but this had not been a commercial success.

== John Kay and Richard Arkwright ==
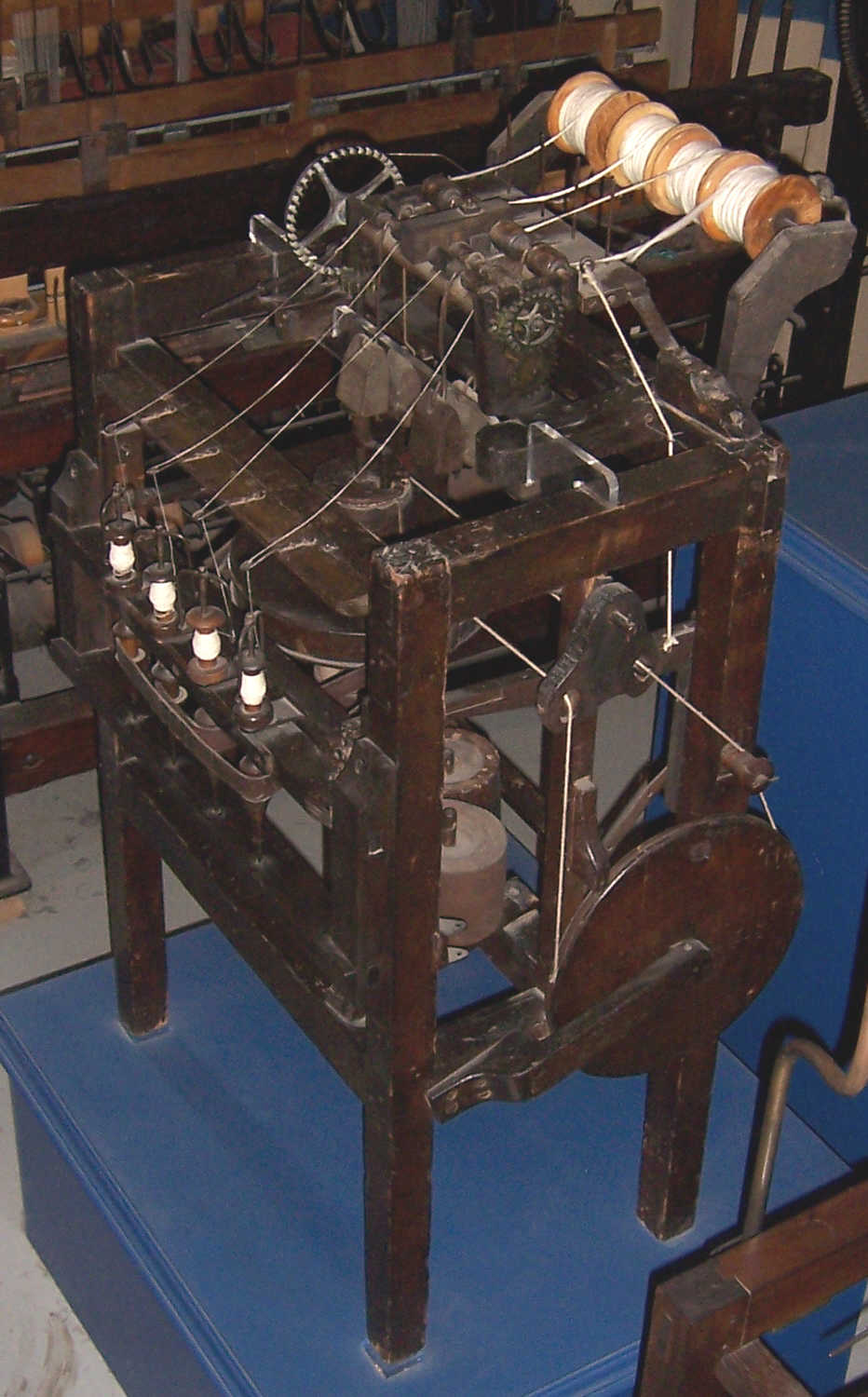
An Arkwright water frame made in 1775

In 1767, Kay began a working relationship with Richard Arkwright, an entrepreneur. The character of this relationship, and in particular, the competing claims of Arkwright, Kay, and also Highs to primacy as inventors, were subsequently to become the subjects of bitter legal dispute (see below).

Arkwright initially engaged Kay to manufacture brass wheels, ostensibly for use in a perpetual motion machine Six months later, Arkwright engaged Kay to build a roller-based spinning-machine.

In 1768 Arkwright brought Kay to the town of Preston to develop a further prototype. Kay had given his bond to serve Arkwright for 21 years, and to keep their methods secret. To deflect attention, Arkwright told outsiders that he and Kay were developing a longitude machine; even so, the secrecy and the noises coming from their workshop led to accusations of witchcraft.

Arkwright and Kay subsequently moved to Nottingham, where in 1769 they constructed a spinning machine embodying the ideas which they had been developing. Arkwright patented it 1769 without mentioning Kay, his "workman". Kay learned of this patent from another Nottingham inventor, James Hargreaves, and told Hargreaves that it was he, Kay, who was the real inventor. Arkwright accused Kay of revealing the design to Hargreaves, and the two fell out. Kay left Arkwright's Nottingham house, where he had been living, ending their relationship. Kay subsequently accused Arkwright of stealing his work tools, and Arkwright made a counter-charge .

The spinning machine constructed in Nottingham by Kay and Arkwright was powered by horses, and apparently was not commercially viable. But it did prove the feasibility of the new machine, known as a "spinning frame". Arkwright was thereby able to finance a more elaborate mill using water power, built in 1771 on the River Derwent at Cromford Mills. The new machine, called a "water frame", would revolutionize the textile manufacturing industry and enrich Arkwright and his partners – but not Kay.

== Disputes over patents ==
Arkwright obtained a "Grand Patent" covering the spinning frame and other inventions in 1775. Subsequent infringements by mill-owners led him to take legal action to assert his rights. A series of trials began in 1781, and in the last of them (1785), Arkwright's claims as an inventor were called into question, Highs, Kay and Kay's wife Sarah all testifying that Arkwright had stolen High's invention of the rollers "by the medium of Mr Kay". Subsequently it was variously claimed that Arkwright had envisaged the design before meeting Kay, that Kay had stolen High's ideas, or that Kay conceived the machine as well as building it.

The case did not settle the question of authorship, but was notable for clarifications of patent law in the instructions given by the judge to the jury: they must find the patent null, regardless of authorship, if they considered it insufficiently novel, or if Arkwright had failed to adequately specify the technology in the patent documents. Presumably on these grounds, the jury set aside the patents—a loss for Arkwright, as well as for Highs and Kay.

== See also ==
- History of patent law
- Tench Coxe
