= Joseph Nasmith =

- Born: 22 April 1850; Manchester, Lancashire, England
- Died: 8 December 1904 (aged 54); Manchester, Lancashire, England
- Occupation: Mechanical engineer

Joseph Nasmith (22 April 1850 – 8 December 1904) was a British consulting textile engineer, editor of the Textile Recorder and author, known for his work on the history and state of the art of the textile industry, particularly cotton spinning and cotton mill construction and engineering.

== Biography ==
Born in Manchester, Nasmith was educated as engineer at the Mechanics' Institutes in Manchester (later to become UMIST), and was apprentice at the machine factory of Henry Wren and John Hopkinson in Manchester.

Nasmith started his career in the industry, working in various parts of the country among others at the Portsmouth Dockyard. Eventually in 1890 he settled in Manchester as consulting engineer, specialized in the textile industry. Over the years he had gained extensive knowledge of the spinning and weaving industry and its origin. He also became editor of the "Textile Recorder," and wrote several articles and books on his speciality. In 1896 was also appointed Examiner in Cotton Spinning at the City and Guilds of London Institute.

Nasmith was member of The Manchester Association of Engineers, and was elected president in the year 1896/97. In 1889 he was appointed Associate of the Institution of Mechanical Engineers, in 1894 Associate Members, and in 1897 full Member. He was Chairman of the Executive of the South Manchester Liberal Association.

Nasmiths son, Frank Nasmith (1879-1949), took over the consulting business and the editorship and also became known as an eminent Textile Consulting Engineer.

== Selected publications ==
- 1884. The students' cotton spinning by Joseph Nasmith.
- 1886. The growth of industries at home and abroad : a paper read before the Manchester Association of Engineers 13th November, 1886 by Joseph Nasmith.
- 1888. Ring Spinning Machinery.
- 1890. Modern cotton spinning machinery, its principles and construction by Joseph Nasmith.
- 1894. Recent cotton mill construction and engineering by Joseph Nasmith.
