= Water frame =

Water-powered spinning frame

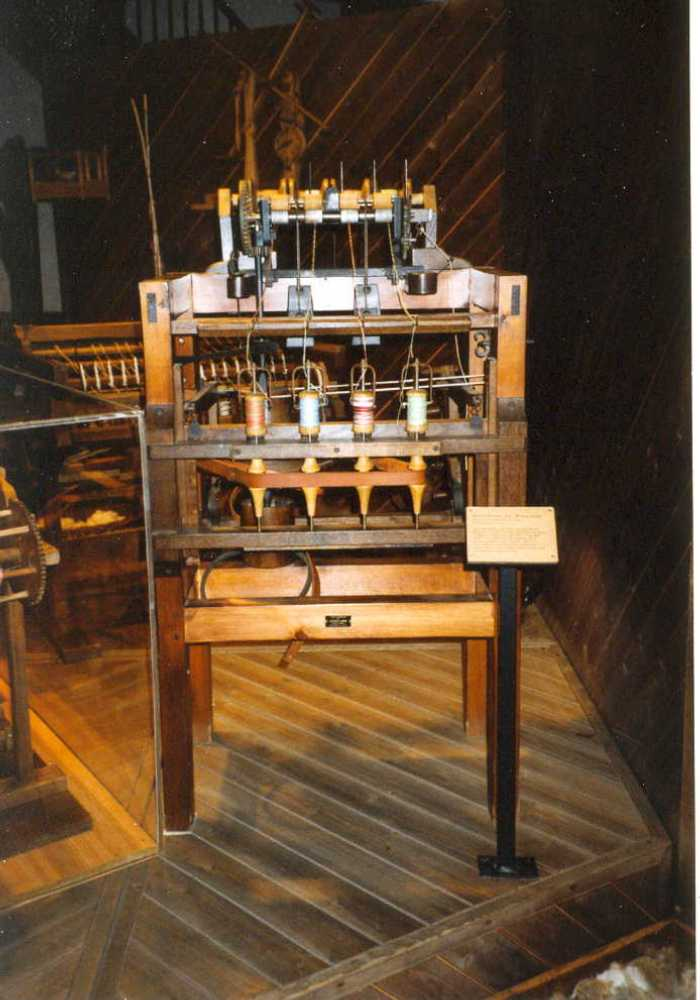
Model of a water frame in the Museum for Early Industrialization in Wuppertal.

The water frame is a spinning frame that is powered by a water wheel.

== History ==
Richard Arkwright, who patented the technology in 1769, designed a model for the production of cotton thread, which was first used in 1765. The Arkwright water frame could spin 96 threads at a time, a faster and easier method than anything before. The design was partly based on a spinning machine built for Thomas Highs by clockmaker John Kay, who was hired by Arkwright. Being run on water power, it produced stronger and harder yarn than the "spinning jenny", and propelled the adoption of the modern factory system.

The name water frame is derived from the use of a water wheel to spin a number of spinning frames. The water wheel provided more power to the spinning frame than human operators, reducing the amount of human labor needed and increasing the spindle count dramatically. However, unlike the spinning jenny, the water frame could spin only one thread at a time until 1779, when Samuel Crompton combined the two inventions into his spinning mule, which was more effective.

The water frame was originally powered by horses at a factory built by Arkwright and partners in Nottingham. In 1770, Arkwright and his partners built a water-powered mill in Cromford, Derbyshire.

== Cromford ==
In 1771, Arkwright installed the water frame in his cotton mill at Cromford, Derbyshire, on the River Derwent, creating one of the first factories that was specifically built to house machinery rather than just bring workers together. It was one of the first instances of the working day being determined by the clock instead of the daylight hours and of people being employed rather than just contracted. In its final form, combined with his carding machine, it was the first factory to use a continuous process from raw material to finished product in a series of operations.

Arkwright played a significant role in the development of the factory system as he combined water power, the water frame, and continuous production with modern employment practices.

== International success ==
The water frame played a significant role in the development of the Industrial Revolution – first in England, but soon also in continental Europe after German entrepreneur Johann Gottfried Brügelmann managed to find out details of the technology, which had been kept very secret; disclosure of details was punishable by the death penalty. Brügelmann managed to build working water frames and used them to open the first spinning factory on the continent, built in 1783 in Ratingen and also named "Cromford", from where the technology spread over the world. The factory building now hosts a museum, the world's only place to see a functioning water frame.

Samuel Slater brought the water frame to America, circumventing the 1774 English ban on textile workers leaving and memorizing details of its construction; he left for New York in 1789. Moses Brown and Slater partnered to create the Slater Mill in Pawtucket in 1793, the first water-powered machine to make thread in America.
