= Peter Atherton (manufacturer) =

British inventor and instrument designer

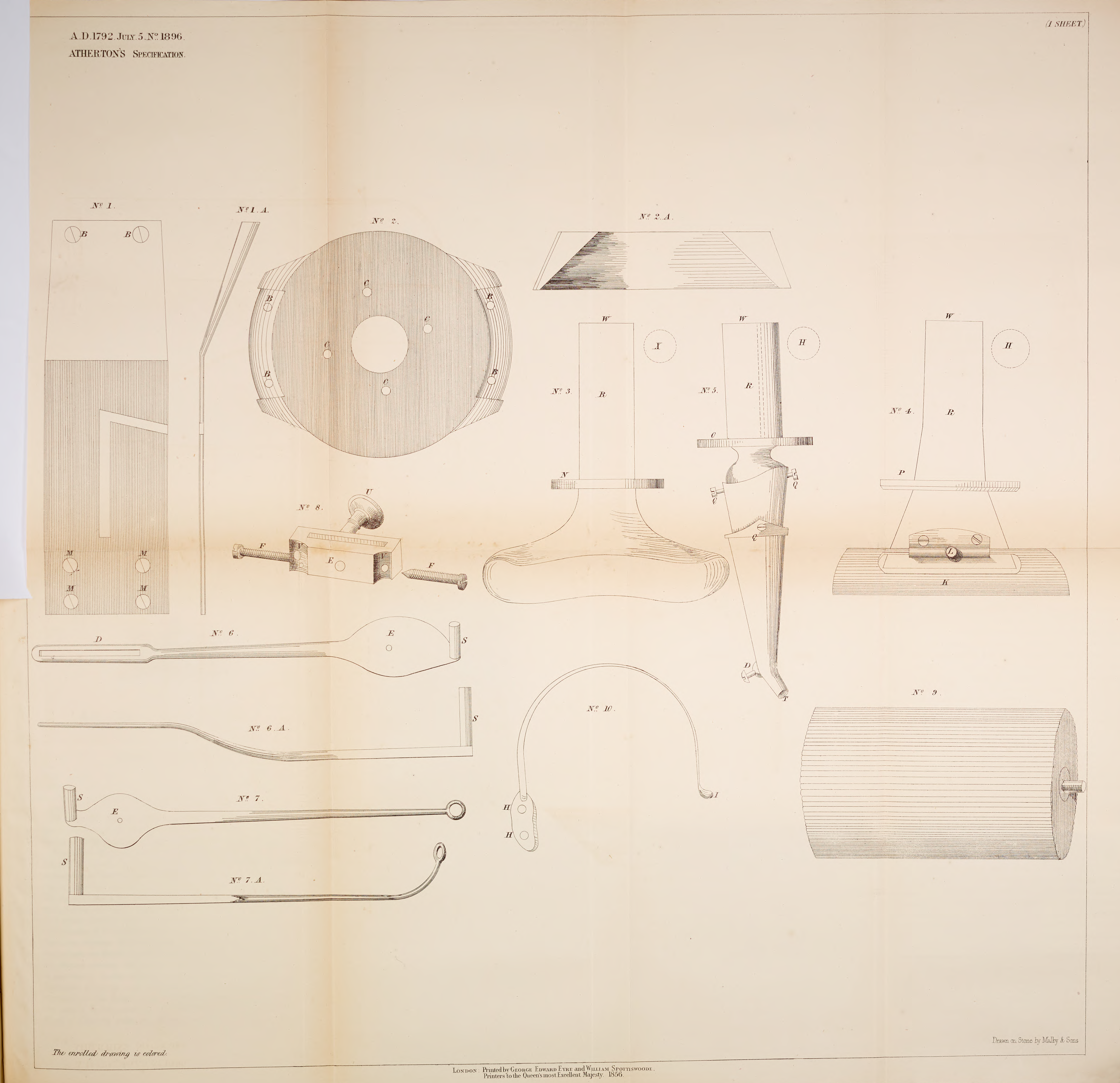
- Atherton's 1792 patent drawing for a roving jack
- Born: Garston, Lancashire
- Baptised: 24 June 1741
- Died: 16 August 1799; Harrogate, Yorkshire
- Resting place: Christ Church, High Harrogate, Yorkshire
- Occupations: Engineer and inventor
- Known for: Assisting Sir Richard Arkwright and John Kay in the development of the spinning frame Patented roving jack (1792 and 1795) Pioneer in the design of steam-powered cotton mills
- Spouse: Bridget Foster (m. 1759–1767 her death)
- Relatives: James Atherton (founder of New Brighton)

Peter Atherton (bapt. 24 June 1741 – 16 August 1799) was a British inventor, entrepreneur, and cotton mill proprietor. Renowned for his pioneering work as a designer and manufacturer of textile machinery during the early Industrial Revolution, Atherton began his career by assisting Richard Arkwright and John Kay in developing the ground-breaking spinning frame in the late 1760s. Subsequently, Atherton developed methods to elongate cotton, wool, and silk fibres, resulting in stronger, smoother yarn and finer quality fabrics, representing a notable progression in textile manufacturing. His influence extended to mill construction nationwide, where his innovative designs and use of steam power marked significant advancements in industrial architecture. He engaged with policymakers and advocated for the interests of the British textile industry, notably participating in a delegation that met with Prime Minister William Pitt the Younger in 1788 to safeguard domestic production against the encroachments of the East India Company. Additionally, he established and invested in numerous enterprises within both the textile and clock and watchmaking industries. One of his companies, Atherton & Co., became a leading manufacturer of cotton spinners, with locations in Warrington, Manchester, and Liverpool.

== Early life and career ==
Born in Garston, Lancashire, Peter Atherton was christened on 24 June 1741, at All Saints Church, Childwall. He was the son of William Atherton (1717-1746), a Yeoman, and his wife Ann Tatlock. The Atherton family had longstanding connections with the ancient Lancashire parish of Prescot, which, by the eighteenth century, had become an important centre of the British clock and watchmaking industry. Historical records place Atherton in the neighbouring township of Sutton in 1763, where he operated as a file cutter, (Note: File cutters were highly skilled artisans who played a crucial role in crafting the intricate metal parts of timepieces.) a profession historically esteemed for its precision and expertise in constructing intricate metal components. His proficiency in working with hand tools, honed in clock and watchmaking, enabled him to transition into manufacturing the precise moving parts of early machinery, notably in the burgeoning cotton industry.

== Relationship with Richard Arkwright ==
Around 1767, Richard Arkwright arrived in Warrington with ambitious plans for a roller-spinning machine inspired by the concept of perpetual motion. He approached John Kay, a local clockmaker, proposing the development of such a machine at a reasonable cost. Kay, who had previously worked for Thomas Highs (also known as Thomas Hayes) on a similar, though not yet perfected engine, agreed to collaborate.

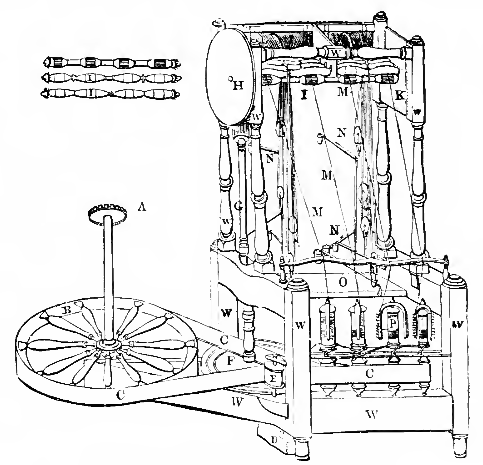
Arkwright's Spinning Frame (precursor to the water frame)

Atherton, then based in Warrington, was approached in January 1768 by John Kay and Richard Arkwright (who at the time was an entrepreneur) for both financial, and technical assistance in creating a model of a spinning machine. Initially hesitant due to Arkwright's impoverished appearance, Atherton quickly relented and agreed to provide Kay with a skilled smith and watch-tool maker to construct the heavier parts of the machine. The understanding was that Kay would undertake the construction of the clockmaker’s components and provide instructions to the workers.

A working model was successfully produced, resulting in the ground-breaking spinning frame, patented by Arkwright on 3 July 1769. This invention revolutionised the textile industry by automating the spinning process, leading to increased efficiency and productivity. The spinning frame laid the foundations for subsequent advancements in textile machinery and played a crucial role in the development of the factory system.

As historians Musson and Robinson have noted, ‘Inventors such as Kay [not to be confused with the aforementioned clockmaker], Paul, Wyatt, Hargreaves, Arkwright, Crompton and Cartwright appear to have had little or no scientific training, though they often utilized the knowledge and skills of clock- and instrument-makers.’

== London ==
In the 1770s, Atherton entered into a commercial partnership with John Hewitt, establishing their business at 49 Red Lion Street (later renamed Britton Street) in Clerkenwell, London. Operating under the name Atherton & Hewitt, the enterprise specialised in manufacturing clock and watchmaking tools. Atherton’s intermittent presence in the capital meant that Hewitt and other members of the Atherton family managed day-to-day operations at the Clerkenwell business. Among them was Atherton’s son-in-law, the Liverpool-born clock and watchmaker Ellis Houlgrave (1759-1793). He married Atherton’s eldest daughter, Ann, at St George’s, Hannover Square, London on 4 January 1778.

During his time in London, Atherton collaborated with the instrument maker William Harrison, the son of John Harrison, the inventor of the marine chronometer. Together, they co-patented an invention, laying the foundations for their future business partnership.

== Holywell Mills, 'The Cotton Trade's First Great Merger' ==
John Smalley of Preston, Lancashire, one of Sir Richard Arkwright’s original partners, erected the first cotton mill in the Greenfield Valley near Holywell, Flintshire, in 1777. Known as the Old or Yellow Mill, it was only the second purpose-built cotton mill in the country after Arkwright’s first at Cromford. Following Smalley’s death in 1782, his interests at Holywell passed to his widow, Elizabeth, who entered into a partnership with the brothers William and Thomas Douglas, and Daniel Whittacker of Manchester.

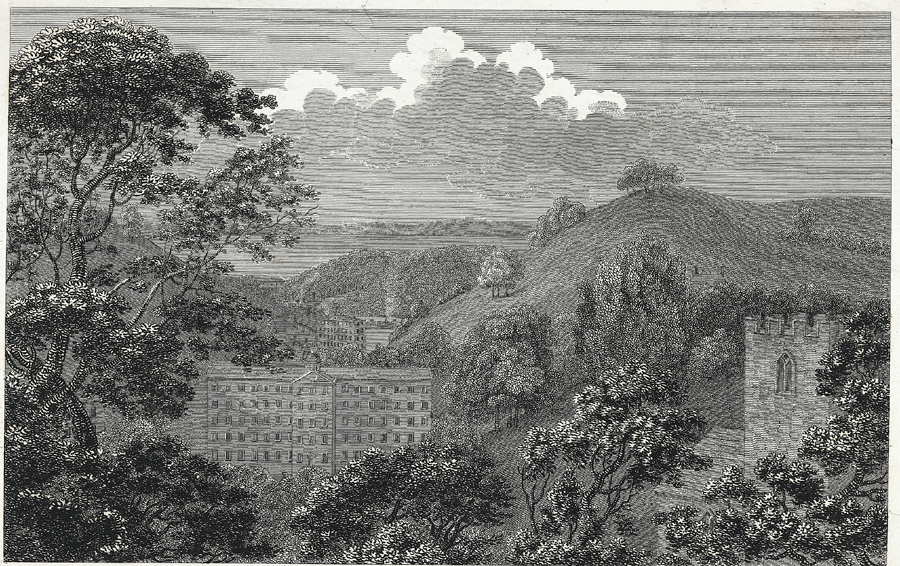
View northwards of Greenfield Valley, Holywell. Upper Cotton Mill in foreground, with the Crescent Mill (middle ground) and Lower Cotton Mill barely visible in the distance. From a line drawing by Moses Griffith, 1796.

The partners commissioned a new mill in the Greenfield Valley, later known as the Upper Mill, completed in a remarkable six weeks during the autumn of 1783. This ‘most magnificent mill’ stood six storeys high and was powered by a 20-foot internal waterwheel, illuminated by nearly two hundred sash windows. Atherton’s role in establishing Smalley’s earlier manufactory can only be conjectured; however, there is no doubt that he played a significant part in the construction of the Upper Mill. In acknowledgement of his contributions, Atherton was formally admitted to the Holywell partnership on 1 January 1785. The reorganised concern was named ‘Atherton and Company’.

In addition to the Greenfield Valley mills and an associated iron foundry, Atherton and his partners seemingly shared profits from the Douglas brothers’ mills at Pendleton, near Manchester, and a later mill in Annan, Dumfries, Scotland. The partnerships momentum led to the swift construction of the Greenfield Valley’s Lower Mill in just ten weeks during the summer of 1785. Atherton designed the mill, which was apparently financed by his friends William Harrison and John Dumbell, both later admitted as partners of the reorganised Holywell Cotton Twist Company.

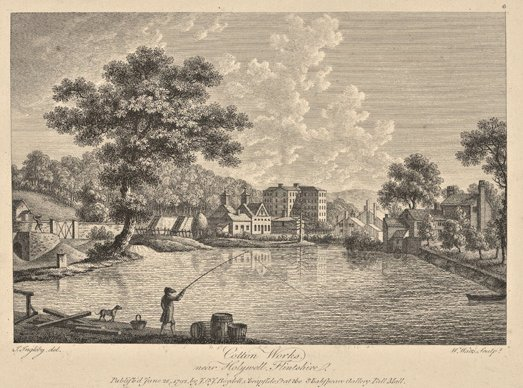
View southwards of the six storey Lower Cotton Mill, Greenfield Valley, Holywell. From a line drawing by Moses Griffith, 1796.

The esteemed mill builder Robert Williams, visiting Holywell in November 1785, praised the Upper and Lower Cotton Mills as ‘two of the finest Mills in England’. By January 1787, Holywell’s impressive output had drawn the attention of the British press, with The Times reporting that ‘as much thread is spun in one day at Holywell, in Flintshire, as will surround the globe at the equator’.

In 1790, the Holywell partners initiated the construction of the Crescent Mill, the fourth cotton mill in the Greenfield Valley. Although Atherton might have been involved in the planning, he apparently sold his shares and withdrew from the Holywell Partnership in the same year.

Today, the historical remnants of the Lower Cotton Mill form an integral feature of the Greenfield Valley Heritage Park. Visitors can see the remains of the six-storey mill, the pits for the water wheels, and the culverts that once carried the water.

== Countermarked Coins ==
In eighteenth century Britain, a shortage of coins prompted innovative employers, including cotton manufacturers such as Atherton and his former associate Sir Richard Arkwright, to resort to paying workers with countermarked foreign coins or tokens. An example is a 1773 Mexican silver eight reales coin countermarked with ‘P. Atherton and Co.,’ currently housed at the British Museum. Another coin, marked HCTCo (likely representing the reorganised Holywell Cotton Twist Company), is preserved at the Birmingham Museum and Art Gallery. Only 3 coins are known to still exist.

== Patents and Innovations ==
Peter Atherton registered three patents. The first, Patent 1179, sealed on 5 February 1778, was granted to William Harrison and Peter Atherton, residents of London, for a method of making screws and machines used in producing mathematical instruments. The second, Patent 1896 (issued just one month before Arkwright's death) and third, Patent 2036, sealed on 5 July 1792, and 29 January 1795, respectively, were granted to Peter Atherton of Hunter Street, Liverpool. These patents pertained to machines involved in the twisting, winding, and doubling of silk, cotton, and wool ‘in a better and more expeditious manner than heretofore…’ Specifically, they related to the design of roving Jacks, essential components in spinning machines for drafting and elongating fibre strands, resulting in improved yarn quality. The original duration of Patent 1896 was for 14 years. However, it is unknown whether it was renewed by his estate since it was listed as an extant patent in 1856.

By the late 1780s, Atherton's inventions relating to the automation of textile manufacturing techniques were gaining international renown. In 1787, the Espiritu de los Mejores Diarios Literarios que se Publican en Europa of Madrid, in Spain, reported Atherton’s latest invention, a revolutionary spinning machine. The journal explained that 'A letter written from London reports that the spinning machine, perfected by Mr Atherton, spins a pound of cotton, giving the thread a length of 80 miles, which previously was only about 69. Lengthening cotton thread increased weaving efficiency, and ultimately facilitated the production of smoother, stronger, and finer fabrics. This partly accounts for the popularity of the Holywell partners’ cotton thread, including major sales to weaving factories in France, especially at Rouen, and in Switzerland at St. Gallen and Zurich. The Holywell partners, aided by Atherton’s innovations, claimed to produce thread counts as high as 190, surpassing Arkwright’s best, which ranged from 80 to 100. The partners also possessed a ‘secret’ machine, likely a mule, capable of spinning threads with counts of 230 and 250, all of which, in the words of historian Chris Aspin, ‘point to the work of Atherton’.

Atherton’s contributions extend beyond patents. He has been credited with designing the second generation of spinning mills featuring either a projection at the front or a wing at each end. The later Holywell mills, featuring projections, were widely imitated. Additionally, the Upper Mill’s centrally positioned internal waterwheel was an innovative design that allowed power to be extracted from both ends of the axle.

Atherton is also credited with designing ‘the first really successful’ taller, and generally steam-powered mills of the 1790s, though their widespread adoption was limited during his lifetime due to the higher cost compared to waterpower. The first spinning mills to rely solely on steam power were not a commercial success. However, the first successful designs have been attributed to Atherton. Atherton’s mills had 3,000 spindles and were powered by 30 horse power Watt rotary engines. Like most entrepreneurs, he experienced early difficulties in recruiting capital. Initially he enlisted the help of William Harrison, and later, J&T Hodgson, Liverpool merchants.

The sales notice for the contents of Atherton’s Liverpool workshop, which appeared in the press following his death, provides further evidence of the high regard in which his contemporaries held his work. On 17 September 1799, the Manchester Mercury reported:

The reputation of Mr Atherton, as a mechanic, is a strong Recommendation of his Machinery, and when it is known that the above are the last Exertions of his great Talents, and the last of his Construction that will be offered to the Public, the Importance of an early Application must be obvious...

Atherton evidently took pride in his skills, while appearing to eschew the social trappings typically accorded to men of his status. On one occasion, he told the steam engine builders Boulton and Watt: ‘Instead of Esquiring me, call me Cotton Machinery Manufacturer’

== The British Cotton Industry vs The East India Company ==
In 1788, British cotton manufacturers pressed for restrictions on the importation of cotton goods by the East India Company (EIC), citing adverse effects on domestic production, unemployment, and economic distress. Meetings in Manchester and Glasgow in early February had led to the appointment of Patrick Colquhoun as their lobbyist by March. Colquhoun, a former Provost of Glasgow University, had previously aided Lancashire manufacturers in repealing the Fustian Tax in 1785.

In May 1788, Atherton and a delegation, led by Colquhoun, met with Prime Minister William Pitt the Younger to present their case. The resulting Act of Parliament exempted British Manufacturers from auction duty, aiming to boost demand and make British products more accessible on the Continent through more affordable distribution. However, the concession fell short of manufacturers’ expectations.

In response to the 1788 trade crisis, William Douglas, Atherton’s partner at Holywell, sought alternatives. Facing competition from the EIC and duties on cotton twist, he contemplated relocating operations to France. Writing to the French Ambassador’s secretary from Chester, he invited him to tour the Holywell and Pendleton factories. However, the French Revolution and the anarchy that followed halted discussions. Douglas subsequently supported various anti-French initiatives, and in September 1789, amidst market volatility partly caused by events on the continent, Peter Atherton and Company garnered praise in Britain for grinding corn for the poor, ‘free of toll, and every other expense’, in response to rising prices.

By the 1790s, evidence suggested a shift in favour of British industry. In 1793, the East India Company noted the surge in home production, reducing the internal consumption of Indian calicoes and muslins. Macpherson’s Annals of Commerce [1805] also highlighted the increasing dominance of British cotton manufacturers in supplying clothing to the domestic market.

== Mill Builder ==
Atherton’s expertise as a machinery manufacturer and mill builder were evidently in high demand during the late 1780s and 1790s. His responsibilities extended beyond designing mill buildings to providing all necessary machinery and instructing workers in its operation and maintenance. He also offered guidance on accounting practices and assisted clients in personnel appointments.

In the early 1790s, Atherton was involved in a remarkable range of significant projects. In 1790, he likely facilitated or supplied machinery for his friend and former partner John Dumbell’s cotton mill in Warrington. The following year, he constructed mills in Mold, Flintshire, and two in Liverpool - one for his partners and one for himself. In 1793, he built the West of England’s only cotton mill at Weir Field, Exeter. In 1794, the six-storey mill he constructed in Nottingham for Robert Dennison and Samuel Oates was, in the opinion of one eyewitness, ‘not surpassed, perhaps not equalled, by any structure of the kind in respect of strength, commodiousness, and beauty’.

Atherton’s influence extended beyond the mills in which he was directly involved. His employee, millwright Henry Gardner, facilitated the millwork for Hodgson and Capstick’s Caton mill (near Lancaster) and Thomas Ridgeway’s factory at Horwich, near Bolton. Atherton also served as an advisor, notably to John Peel of Burton-on-Trent, the son of manufacturer Robert (“Parsley”) Peel and uncle of the future Prime Minister Sir Robert Peel, on the use of steam power in cotton mills. Peel’s mill at Bond End, Burton, was subsequently converted to steam power.

While Atherton actively sought contracts, not all applications were successful. In 1791, London’s Albion Mills, famously the inspiration for William Blake's ‘dark satanic mills’ and a symbol of the Industrial Revolution, burned down. Atherton, responding to the disaster, wrote to Boulton and Watt proposing its conversion into a cotton mill utilising one of their steam engines. The project never materialised, and the burnt shell of Albion Mills was eventually repurposed for residential use.

== Salford Engine Twist Company ==
In 1791, Atherton formed a partnership with Charles Wood, John Philips and George Philips of Manchester. Together, they erected a five-storey cotton mill in Salford powered by a Boulton and Watt steam engine, extending from the banks of the River Irwell to Chapel Street. The original building, approximately 30 feet wide, housed water frames and featured an engine at the river end. In 1792, George Augustus Lee, a pioneer in implementing gas lighting in industry and a fellow innovator in steam-powered cotton manufacturing, joined the partnership. The Salford Mill gained acclaim as a model of enterprise, attracting visits from numerous industrialists, scientists, and engineers. Atherton retired from the concern on 3 March 1794.

== Kirk Mill ==
Kirk Mill in Chipping, Lancashire, stands as a rare surviving example of an Arkwright-type cotton mill. Acknowledged as one of the world’s first factories, it is also a Grade II listed building. On 25 June 1789, Kirk Mill was auctioned at Preston, Lancashire, where the high-bidder was Ellis Houlgrave, Peter Atherton's son-in-law, a Liverpool-born clockmaker, recently returned from London. While officially holding the titles of proprietor and occupier, Houlgrave’s venture seems to have been backed and outfitted by Atherton. After Houlgrave’s untimely death in June 1793, Atherton, in partnership with William Harrison and John Rose, assumed ownership.

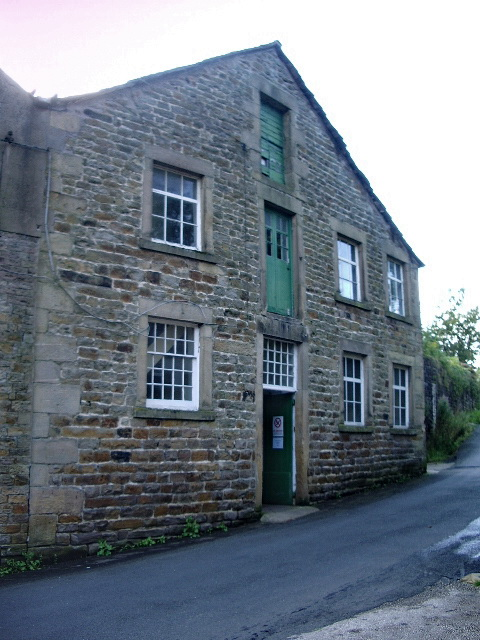
Side view of the historic Kirk Mill in Chipping, Lancashire.

Atherton and his partners expanded operations, planning a mule mill and apprentice residence at Saunder Rake. In neighbouring Grove Square, they constructed a new building, including stables, a warehouse, and reeling rooms. Their insurance of Kirk Mill on 11 December 1795 indicated significant growth, with the value of millwright work and machinery increasing from £600 to £4000, and stock insured for £300.

Following the expansion, the partnership involving Atherton, Harrison, and Rose was dissolved on 24 December 1796. Subsequently, the partnership solely between Atherton and Harrison was dissolved on 11 September 1797, leaving Atherton as the sole owner of Kirk Mill until his death in 1799.

== Death ==
Peter Atherton died on 16 August 1799 in Harrogate, Yorkshire, where he had apparently travelled to benefit from its healing waters. His burial took place at Christ Church, High Harrogate on 20 August 1799. A few months after Atherton’s death, his cotton mills and machinery were advertised for sale.

== Personal ==
Atherton married Bridget Foster (1738-1767) at St Peter's Church, Liverpool on 29 November 1759. They had three daughters: Ann, who married the Liverpool-born clock and watchmaker Ellis Houlgrave (1759-1793); Margaret, who married Hugh Humphreys of Pen y pylle, Holywell, Flintshire, a lawyer and later High Sheriff of Flintshire; and Elizabeth, who married Manchester merchant James Rogerson.

Throughout the 1790s, Atherton's residence and base of operations was Hunter Street, Liverpool. His Liverpool tax records from 1798 also record him trading from Hunter Street. Atherton's daughter Ann and his grandsons, Peter Houlgrave and Robert Joseph Atherton Houlgrave, moved to this location after the death of Ann's husband in 1793. Atherton's grandsons later founded what became the Liver Grease, Oil and Chemical Company, which, in its various iterations, provisioned the port of Liverpool for more than two centuries.

Peter Atherton was a cousin of James Atherton, a Liverpool merchant who founded the seaside resort of New Brighton in 1832.
