= William Harrison (instrument maker) =

English instrument maker

William Harrison (20 May 1728 – 24 April 1815) was an English instrument maker, the son of John Harrison, inventor of the marine chronometer.

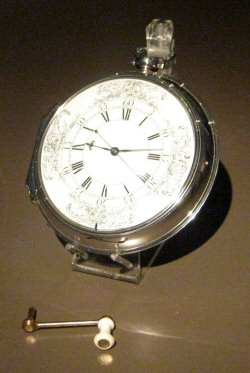
The Harrison H4 marine chronometer

== Early life ==
He was born in Barrow-upon-Humber but moved to London to assist his father in developing the chronometer.

== Development of marine watches ==
In 1761 he sailed to Jamaica on HMS Deptford in charge of his aged father's latest development, the "sea watch", now known as the H4 marine watch, which was to undergo critical performance trials during the transatlantic crossing. Parliament had offered a large prize (20,000 pounds) for a practical working solution to the problem of determining longitude at sea and set up the Board of Longitude to evaluate submissions. In spite of the success of the H4 trials, where the timepiece was shown to be very accurate and reliable and had enabled the longitude to be accurately determined, the Board of Longitude insisted on a second transatlantic crossing to confirm the results. He undertook a second voyage in 1764, sailing to Barbados on HMS Tartar. However, the Board of Longitude were still not convinced that the conditions for the prize had been met.

He then worked with his father, who was now in his late 70s, to produce the H5 chronometer which in 1772 they demonstrated to King George III with great success, gaining the king's support in their fight for the prize offered by Parliament. They were eventually awarded a sum of money, but not the full amount originally offered.

In his will, drafted shortly before his death, William Harrison acknowledged his late father's sole invention of the H4 chronometer, yet asserted their joint involvement in its creation by stating the watch had been 'made by him and me conjointly...'

== Other roles ==
He demonstrated his own inventive talents as early as 1757 when, as a watchmaker residing at Red Lion Square in London, he patented shock-absorbing springs that significantly improved the safety and comfort of carriage passengers. Later, he collaborated with the textile machinery manufacturer Peter Atherton on a patent related to a method for making screws and machines used in producing mathematical instruments. Harrison and Atherton subsequently became business partners in textile manufacturing, collaborating on ventures in the Greenfield Valley, near Holywell, Flintshire, and at Kirk Mill, in Chipping, Lancashire.

He was elected a Fellow of the Royal Society in 1765, his candidature citation reading "Mr William Harrison of East Street Red Lyon Square, being desirous of the honour of becoming a Member of this Society, Is recommended by us as a Person well skilled in Mechanicks, and several other useful other parts of Mechanical learning, and well known to the learned not only in this Kingdom, but several parts of Europe, for his careful Experiments for the discovery of the Longitude at Sea and therefore we think he will be an useful member of this Society." He was described as a Scientific Instrument Maker.

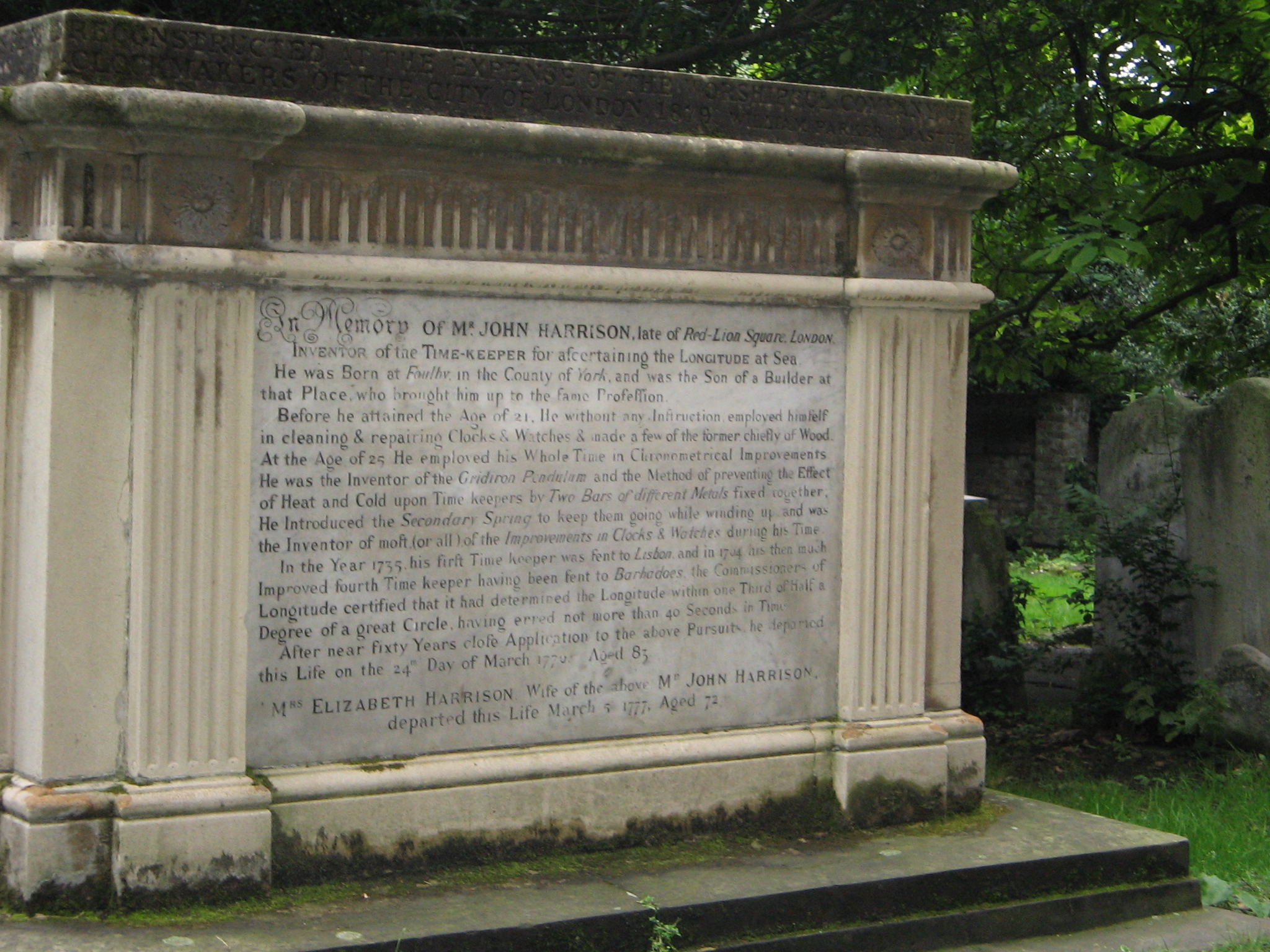
Tomb of John and William Harrison, Hampstead

He was a Governor of the Foundling Hospital and helped to teach music to the children. He was a deputy lieutenant of Monmouthshire and Middlesex and was elected Sheriff of Monmouthshire in 1791.

== Death ==
He died in 1815 and was buried in his father's tomb in St John's churchyard, Hampstead. The south face of the tomb has the inscription "And to his Son, WILLIAM HARRISON, FRS, born 1728 at Barrow-on-Humber, died 1815. He was the custodian of his father’s prize-winning watch H4 during the vital official trials at sea to Jamaica in 1761, and to Barbados in 1764. He also actively helped his father in the long and difficult negotiations with the Board of Longitude and Parliament when claiming the £20,000 prize. For many years he was a Prominent Governor of the Foundling Hospital, teaching music to the children, and was appointed High Sheriff of Monmouthshire in 1791"

== In popular culture ==
Ian Hart portrayed William Harrison in the 2000 TV miniseries Longitude, with Liam Jennings as a younger version of the character. The critically acclaimed series, directed by Charles Sturridge and based on the 1995 book of the same title by Dava Sobel, starred Michael Gambon as John Harrison and Jeremy Irons as twentieth-century horologist Rupert Gould. The miniseries also featured an impressive ensemble cast, including Anna Chancellor, Brian Cox, Stephen Fry, and Bill Nighy.
