= Sarah Bates =

Sarah or Sara Bates may refer to:

- Sarah Bates (Mormon) (1817–1888), American Mormon pioneer
- Sarah Bates (Shaker) (1792–1881), American Shaker artist
- Sarah Bates (singer) (1758–1811), English singer
- Sara Bates (born 1944), American Cherokee artist
