= Listed buildings in Chipping, Lancashire =

Chipping is a civil parish in Ribble Valley, Lancashire, England. It contains 43 buildings that are recorded in the National Heritage List for England as designated listed buildings. Apart from the village of Chipping, the parish is rural. Within the village, the listed buildings include three churches and associated structures, three public houses, a former school, former almshouses, and a former cotton mill. Elsewhere the listed buildings are domestic or related to farming, plus a former milestone.

== Key ==
Grade	Criteria
Grade I	Buildings of exceptional interest, sometimes considered to be internationally important.
Grade II*	Particularly important buildings of more than special interest.
Grade II	Buildings of national importance and special interest.

== Buildings ==
Name and location	Photograph	Date	Notes	Grade
St Bartholomew's Church; 53.8847°N 2.5764°W		c. 1450	The tower dates from about 1450, with the rest of the church built in 1506, followed by rebuilding of the exterior in 1872. It is constructed in sandstone with stone slate roofs. The church consists of a nave, north and south aisles, a chancel, a south porch, and a west tower. On the roof is a dormer with a five-light mullioned window under a timber gable.	II*
Wolfen Hall; 53.8975°N 2.6002°W		16th century (possible)	The house was altered in 1867–68. It is constructed in stone with a slate roof. At the rear is a parallel range, probably from a later date. The house is in two storeys, and has casement windows.	II
Hesketh End; 53.8643°N 2.5896°W		1591	The sandstone house was altered in the early 17th century, and restored in 1907. It is in the form of a hall with a cross-wing, and is in two storeys with an attic. The windows are mullioned. The house is notable for the Latin inscriptions on the exterior, most of which record incidents in history.	I
2 and 4 Church Raike; 53.8849°N 2.5768°W	—	17th century	A pair of cottages, originally one house. They are constructed in sandstone with a slate roof. They are in two storeys with an attic, each cottage being in one bay. Some of the original windows are blocked, or have been replaced by doors.	II
20 and 22 Talbot Street; 53.8847°N 2.5749°W		1668	No 20 was formerly the Post Office and No 22 was John Brabin's house. They are constructed in sandstone with slate roofs, and are in two storeys. Some of the windows are mullioned, and others are sashes.	II*
Old Vicarage; 53.8724°N 2.5967°W		1668	The house possibly contains earlier fabric. It is constructed in sandstone with a stone slate roof on the front and a slate roof at the back. The windows are mullioned, and there is a finial on the roof of the porch. Inside the house the walls are timber-framed.	II*
12 and 14 Talbot Street; 53.8846°N 2.5753°W		Late 17th century	A pair of stone houses, with roofs of stone slate and slate. They are in two storeys with an attic. The windows are mullioned.	II
15 Windy Street; 53.8842°N 2.5754°W	—	Late 17th century	A stone house, partly pebbledashed with a slate roof. It is in two storeys with a cellar, the cellar being entered from ground level at the rear. On the ground floor are sash windows, the windows on the upper floor and rear being mullioned. Inside is a stone fireplace with a bread oven.	II
17 and 19 Windy Street; 53.8841°N 2.5753°W	—	Late 17th century	A pair of sandstone houses, with roofs of stone slate or slate. They have two storeys and an attic. The windows are mullioned. To the right is an 18th-century extension.	II
Little Blacksticks; 53.8765°N 2.62345°W	—	Late 17th century	This is a sandstone house with a slate roof. It is in two storeys, and has mullioned windows. To the east is a later single-storey extension.	II
Brabin's Almshouses; 53.8837°N 2.5746°W	—	1684	Originating as three almshouses, these were later converted into two cottages. They are constructed in sandstone with stone slate roofs, and are in two storeys. There are three doorways, and all the windows have two lights separated by a mullion. On the right side gable is a plaque inscribed with the name John Brabin and the date.	II
Brabin's School; 53.8839°N 2.5749°W		1684	A former school, in sandstone with a slate roof. It is in two storeys, the upper storey appearing to be very tall. The building has a three-bay symmetrical front, with a central gabled porch, surmounted by three ball finials. Above the door is a lintel inscribed with initials and the date, and above this is a plaque, also carrying an inscription.	II
Parsonage Farmhouse; 53.8714°N 2.5968°W	—	1685	A rendered sandstone house with a slate roof. The part of the house to the right of the door appears to be from a later date. The house is in two storeys, and the windows are mullioned.	II
Sundial; 53.88462°N 2.57614°W		1708	The sundial is in the churchyard of St Bartholomew's Church. It consists of a sandstone fluted Doric column, standing on a stepped base, and carrying round brass plate with a gnomon.	II
Higher Core Farmhouse; 53.8919°N 2.6213°W	—	1731	This farmhouse is built in sandstone with slate roofs, and has two storeys. Its front is in three bays, and the windows are sashes. Above the door is a plaque inscribed with a name and date. There are later extensions to the rear.	II
Black Hall Farmhouse; 53.8809°N 2.5893°W	—	1755	The farmhouse is in sandstone with a slate roof, in a double-pile plan. It is in two storeys, and has mullioned windows. To the right is a single-bay extension dating from the 19th century.	II
Woodgates Farmhouse; 53.8896°N 2.6159°W	—	1768	This is a sandstone house with a slate roof, and a farm building attached to the left. It is in two storeys, and three bays. The windows in the lower floor of the house are Venetian windows; in the upper storey the windows are mullioned. The farm building has a wide cart entrance.	II
Milestone; 53.86248°N 2.61078°W	—	1769	Originally a milestone, this was later used as a gatepost. It is in sandstone, and has a square section and a shaped top. It is inscribed with the (defaced) distances to Blackburn, Clitheroe and Garstang.	II
2 Talbot Street; 53.8845°N 2.5755°W	—	Late 18th century	The house is constructed in sandstone, and has a hipped slate roof. It stands on the corner of Talbot Street and Windy Street, and is in two storeys with a cellar.	II
Fields Farmhouse; 53.8712°N 2.5800°W	—	Late 18th century	The farmhouse is in pebbledashed stone with slate roofs. It has a double-pile plan, is in two storeys, and has a two-bay front. The stone porch has fluted Doric pilasters and a moulded pediment. The windows are sashes.	II
Grove House; 53.8873°N 2.5794°W	—	Late 18th century	The house is in sandstone with quoins and a Welsh slate roof. There are two storeys and an attic, a main range of two bays, a single-storey extension, and a lean-to. The round-headed doorway, to the left, has impost blocks and a fanlight, and the windows are sashes.	II
Higher Chipping House; 53.8682°N 2.5875°W	—	Late 18th century	This is a sandstone house with a slate roof, and has a double-pile plan. It is in two storeys with an attic, and has a three-bay front. The windows on the front are sashes, and those on the back are mullioned. The doorcase has an architrave, fluted Doric pilasters, a triglyph frieze, and a moulded pediment.	II
Proctor's Shop; 53.8844°N 2.5754°W	—	Late 18th century	The shop is constructed in sandstone, and has a slate roof. At the right end are chamfered quoins. The front is in two bays. The windows are modern, and the doors have plain surrounds.	II
Village Tuck Shop; 53.8847°N 2.5750°W	—	Late 18th century	This is a house and a shop in stone with a slate roof. It is in two storeys and two bays, with a one-bay extension to the right containing an entrance to the yard. The windows are sashes.	II
Wallclough; 53.8691°N 2.6014°W	—	Late 18th century	The house is in rendered sandstone with a slate roof. It has two storeys, and is in two bays. The windows are mullioned.	II
Stable and barn, Talbot Hotel; 53.8848°N 2.5752°W	—	Late 18th century (possible)	The barn and stable are constructed in sandstone and have stone slate and slate roofs. At the front is a wide entrance, a small window and a doorway. On the right side are two more doorways.	II
Talbot Hotel; 53.8848°N 2.5752°W		1779	This is a public house constructed in sandstone with a slate roof, and is in two storeys with an attic. The symmetrical main front is rendered, and has three bays. The windows are sashes.	II
Kirk Mill; 53.8873°N 2.5800°W		1785	This originated as a cotton spinning mill powered by a waterwheel. From the middle of the 19th century it was used as a factory for making chairs, but closed in 2010. The mill is constructed in stone with roofs of slate and corrugated sheeting. Its associated mill pond's retaining walls, outflow and leat are included in the listing.	II
Kirk House; 53.8873°N 2.5805°W	—	1793	The house is in sandstone with a slate roof, and has three storeys. It is in four bays, the left three bays being canted. The doorcase is surrounded by Tuscan pilasters and an open pediment. The windows are sashes.	II
12 Windy Street; 53.8840°N 2.5754°W	—	c. 1800	A symmetrical sandstone house with a slate roof. It is in three storeys with a front of three bays. The door has a plain surround, and most of the windows are sashes.	II
Barn, Hesketh End; 53.8644°N 2.5895°W	—	c. 1800 (possible)	The barn is constructed in sandstone with a slate roof. Its features include two wide entrances, three doorways, and two pitching holes.	II
7 Talbot Street; 53.88485°N 2.57497°W	—	1823	A house and a shop constructed in sandstone with a slate roof. It is in two storeys and has a front of two bays. The windows, other than the shop window, are sashes.	II
8 and 10 Talbot Street; 53.8845°N 2.5753°W	—	Early 19th century	A pair of sandstone houses with a slate roof in two storeys. Each house is in a single bay, with the doors adjoining. The windows are sashes.	II
4 Windy Street; 53.88431°N 2.57572°W	—	Early 19th century	The house is attached to the Sun Inn. It is constructed in sandstone with a slate roof. The house has two storeys and is in a single bay. The windows are sashes, and the door is approached by stone steps with an iron railing.	II
6 Windy Street; 53.88424°N 2.57563°W	—	Early 19th century	The house is constructed in sandstone with a slate roof, and is in two storeys with a single bay. The windows are sashes, and the door is approached by stone steps with an iron railing. Attached to the left is a barn with a door, and a small pitching door above.	II
Sun Inn; 53.8844°N 2.5758°W		Early 19th century	A public house, built in sandstone with a slate roof. The main portion is symmetrical, in three bays, and two storeys plus an attic and a cellar. The door is reached by a double flight of steps with a handrail. The windows on the front are sashes, and in the right gable is a two-light mullioned window. To the right of the main portion is a single-bay extension.	II
Moss Side; 53.8539°N 2.6117°W	—	1826	The symmetrical sandstone house has a slate roof. It is in two storeys and two bays. The windows are sashes. The doorcase has Tuscan pilasters, and a semicircular head with a fluted keystone. To the left is another bay.	II
St Mary's Church; 53.8842°N 2.5743°W		1827	A Roman Catholic church in stone with a slate roof. The sides are in five bays with semicircular-headed windows. Inside is a gallery containing an organ. Between the nave and the chancel are four large attached Corinthian columns. There are two similar columns between the chancel and the Lady chapel.	II
St Mary's Old School; 53.8837°N 2.5741°W	—	1827	Built as a Roman Catholic school in sandstone with a hipped slate roof. It is in a single storey with a cellar at the northeast end. The door is in the southwest wall. Along the northwest wall are four sash windows under semicircular heads.	II
Presbytery; 53.8843°N 2.5742°W	—	1827	The presbytery is attached to St Mary's Church. It is in stone with a slate roof. Around the doorway are attached Tuscan columns, a plain frieze, and a moulded cornice, above which is a fanlight. The windows are sashes.	II
Mossley Farmhouse; 53.8692°N 2.6208°W	—	1828	A sandstone farmhouse with a slate roof in two storeys. It is in four bays, and contains sash windows.	II
Congregational Church; 53.8836°N 2.5777°W		1838	Originally called Providence Chapel, it was built for the Congregationalists. It is constructed in sandstone. On the southwest side are two doors with round-headed windows above. The northwest gabled end contains a single-storey porch.	II
Walls and steps, St Bartholomew's Church; 53.88446°N 2.57619°W		Uncertain	The sandstone walls surround the churchyard, with nine three-sided steps leading from the street to the level of the churchyard.	II
