= Joah Bates =

English musician

Joah Bates (c. 1741 – 8 June 1799) was an English musician.

== Life ==
Joah Bates was baptized at the parish church in Halifax on 8 March 1740 O.S. (8 March 1741 N.S.). He was the son of Henry Bates, an innkeeper and parish clerk. He received his early education at Dr. Ogden's school and learned music from Hartley, organist of Rochdale. He went afterwards to Manchester to Dr. Parnell's school, and while there he was much struck by the organ-playing of Robert Wainwright, organist of the collegiate church. He was subsequently sent to Eton College, where, on 2 August 1756, he obtained a scholarship. While he was at Eton he was deprived of music altogether, but he kept up his practice by playing on imaginary keys on the table. One of the masters, Mr. G. Graham, discovered his passion for music, and, being himself an enthusiastic amateur, gave him much encouragement. On 31 July 1758 he was nominated for a scholarship at King's College, Cambridge. But he was not admitted to the college till 4 May 1760.

About this time he obtained a university scholarship. He graduated with a B.A. in 1764 and an M.A. in 1767. During his term of residence in Cambridge he got up and himself conducted a performance of ‘Messiah’ in his native town, that occasion being the first on which an oratorio had been performed north of the River Trent. In his orchestra William Herschel, the astronomer, played first violin. Shortly afterwards he succeeded to a fellowship at King's and was appointed college tutor. The attention of Lord Sandwich, the first lord of the admiralty, whose second son was a pupil of Bates, was at this time attracted to his wonderful musical and general talents, and he made him his private secretary, and procured for him a small post in the post-office worth 100 pounds a year.

He was a commissioner of the Sixpenny Office, 1772–6, and of Greenwich Hospital from 1775 till his death. In March 1776 he obtained the more lucrative post of commissioner of the Victualling Office through the same interest, and in the same year became conductor to the Concerts of Ancient Music, which had just been started. By this time he had written a 'Treatise on Harmony,’ which was translated into German. On 21 December 1780 he married his pupil, Sarah Harrop.

In 1783, in conjunction with Lord Fitzwilliam and Sir Watkin Williams-Wynn, he set on foot the Handel Commemoration, which took place in Westminster Abbey in May and June 1784. At these performances he held the post of conductor. In 1785 the king appointed him a commissioner of the customs, and about the same time his name appears as vice-president of Westminster Hospital. He subsequently invested all his own and his wife's fortune in the unfortunate project of the Albion Mills, and when these were burnt in 1791, he was nearly ruined. The vexation and trouble resulting from this mischance brought on (says Burney) a complaint in his chest which finally proved fatal. In 1793 he resigned the conductorship of the Ancient Concerts, and on 8 June 1799 he died.
