= St Bartholomew's Church, Chipping =

Coordinates: 53.8847°N 2.5764°W

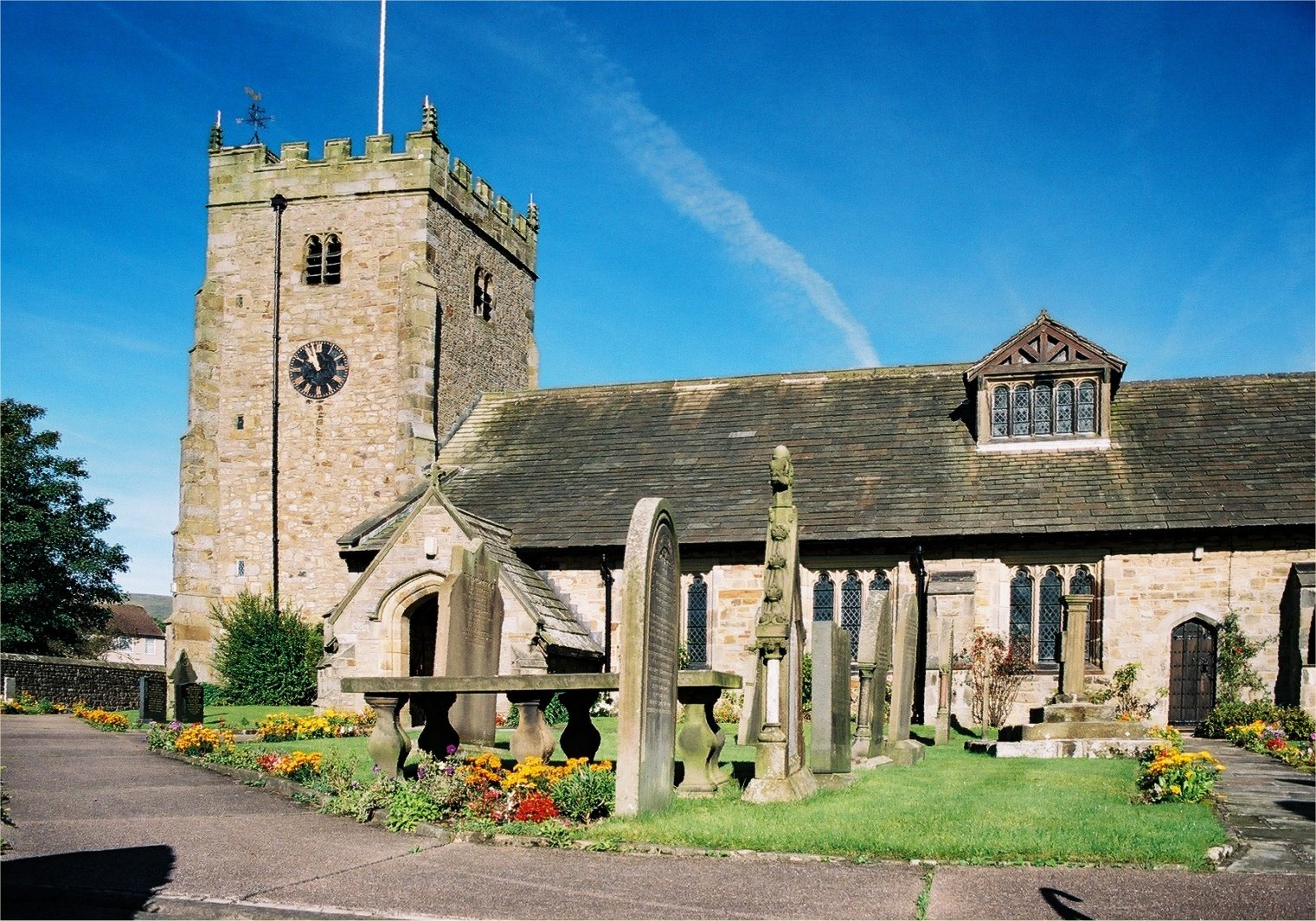
- St Bartholomew's Church, Chipping, from the south

- Location in the Borough of Ribble Valley
- OS grid reference: SD 622 433
- Location: Chipping, Lancashire
- Country: England
- Denomination: Anglican
- Website: St Bartholomew, Chipping

History
- Status: Parish church
- Dedication: Saint Bartholomew

Architecture
- Functional status: Active
- Heritage designation: Grade II*
- Designated: 13 February 1967
- Architectural type: Church
- Style: Gothic

Specifications
- Materials: Sandstone, stone slate roofs

Administration
- Province: York
- Diocese: Blackburn
- Archdeaconry: Blackburn
- Deanery: Whalley
- Parish: Chipping St Bartholomew

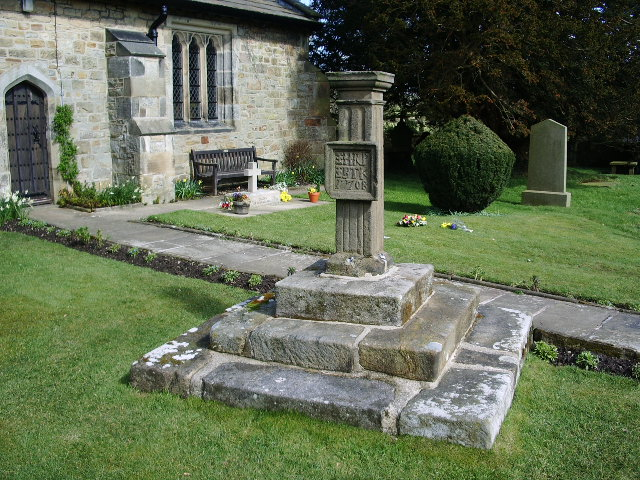
Sundial in the churchyard

St Bartholomew's Church is in the village of Chipping, Lancashire, England. It is an active Anglican parish church in the deanery of Whalley, the archdeaconry of Blackburn, and the diocese of Blackburn. Its benefice is united with that of St Michael, Whitewell. The church is recorded in the National Heritage List for England as a designated Grade II* listed building.

== History ==
A church has been present in the village since at least 1230, and it is possible that a church was here during the Saxon era. The tower was added in about 1450, and the rest of the church was rebuilt in 1506. Further rebuilding took place in 1872, and most of the exterior is the result of that rebuilding.

== Architecture ==
=== Exterior ===
St Bartholomew's is constructed in sandstone rubble with a stone slate roof. Its plan consists of a three-bay nave, north and south aisles, a two-bay chancel, a south porch, and a west tower. The tower is in three stages, with diagonal buttresses. It has a west doorway, above which is a three-light window. The bell openings have two lights. On the south side of the roof of the body of the church is a dormer with a five-light mullioned window under a timber gable. In the south wall of the chancel is a priest's door. The east window has five lights.

=== Interior ===
Inside the church there is no division between the nave and the chancel. The five-bay arcade is carried on octagonal piers, the arches on the north side being lower and more pointed. Some of the capitals on the north arcade have carvings; these include a female head dating from the 14th century, a snake, flowers, and a pair of faces. In the south wall of the chancel is a 13th-century piscina. The octagonal font has concave sides and is crudely carved with emblems, including the instruments of the Passion. One of the windows contains stained glass by Shrigley and Hunt dating from 1966 with a semi-abstract design. In the church is a brass to the two wives of Robert Parkingson; they died in 1611 and 1623 respectively. Another brass is to the 15th Earl of Derby who died in 1893. There are also monuments dated 1777 and 1816. The two-manual pipe organ was made in 1876 by Henry Willis, and restored in 2003 by David Wells. There is a ring of six bells, all of which were cast in 1793 by Thomas Mears I at the Whitechapel Bell Foundry.

== External features ==
In the churchyard, to the south of the church, is a sundial dated 1708. It is in sandstone, and consists of a square base with three steps, supporting a square fluted Doric column with a base and a capital. On the top is a round brass plate with a gnomon. On the side of the sundial is a plaque inscribed with initials and the date. The sundial is listed at Grade II. Also listed at Grade II are the walls around the churchyard, and the flight of steps leading up towards the church.

== See also ==
- Listed buildings in Chipping, Lancashire
