= Sarah Bates (singer) =

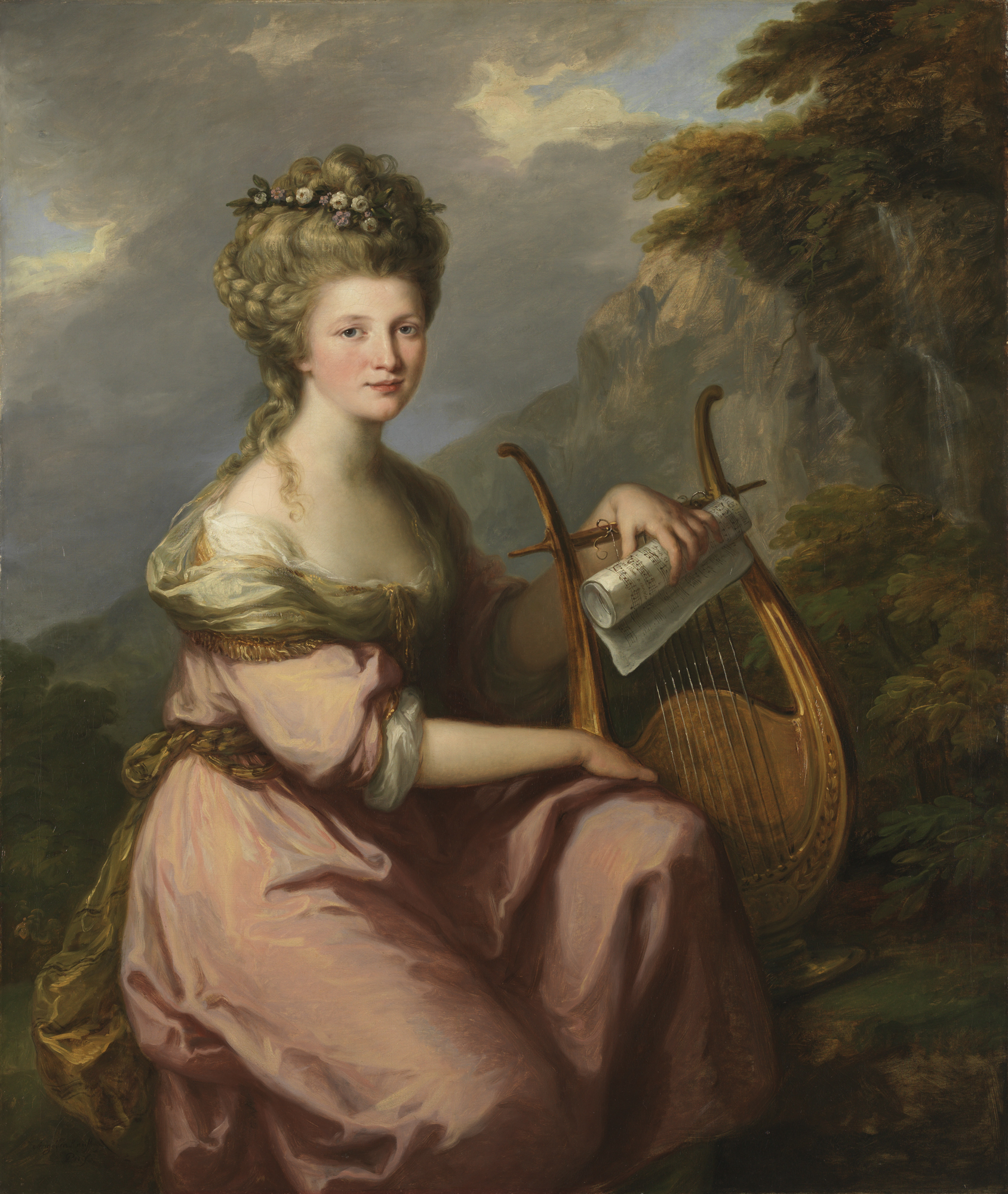
- Angelica Kauffman, Portrait of Sarah Harrop (Mrs. Bates) as a Muse, ca. 1780–81, in the Princeton University Art Museum

Background information
- Born: Sarah Harrop; Lancashire
- Died: 11 December 1811
- Occupation: Singer

Sarah Bates (née Harrop, October 1758 – 11 December 1811) was an English singer born in Lancashire. She was married to the conductor Joah Bates.

== Early life and education ==
Sarah Harrop was born at Woodbrook, Saddleworth on the western edge of Yorkshire. Her parents were Robert and Elizabeth (born Harrop). Her father was a clothier and her brother, Robert, was the organist for the nearby Hey Chapel. She was educated and worked in Halifax.

== Singing career ==
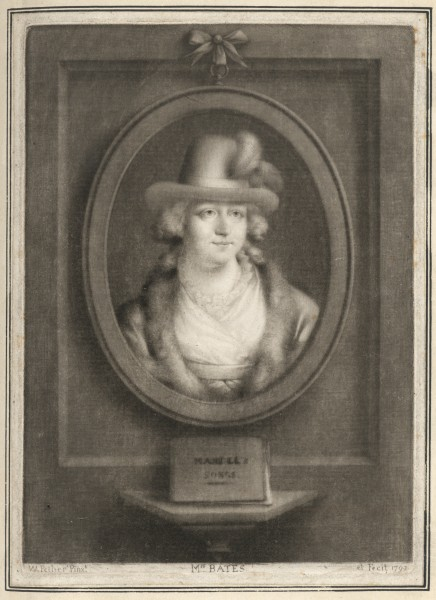
Sarah Bates by William Pether

On one occasion she sang in public in Halifax where she was heard by Dr. Howard, of Leicester, who prophesied that she would one day throw all the English, nay even the Italian female singers far behind her. While she resumed her ordinary occupations, Dr. Howard sounded her praises in London, until at last the Sandwich Catch Club deputed him to bring her to London, where she met with very great success. In London she studied Italian music under Sacchini, and the compositions of Handel and the older masters under her future husband.

She was a successful concert singer, both before and after her marriage with Joah Bates, which took place in 1780. Her chief success was made in sacred music, which she delivered with much impressiveness. Among her secular songs the most famous was Purcell's "Mad Bess".

Angelica Kauffman painted her portrait depicting her as Erato, the muse of lyric poetry, which was exhibited at the Royal Academy in 1781 and is now in the possession of the Princeton University Art Museum.

== Death ==
She died at Foley Place on 11 December 1811.
