= Albion Mills, Southwark =

Albion Mills
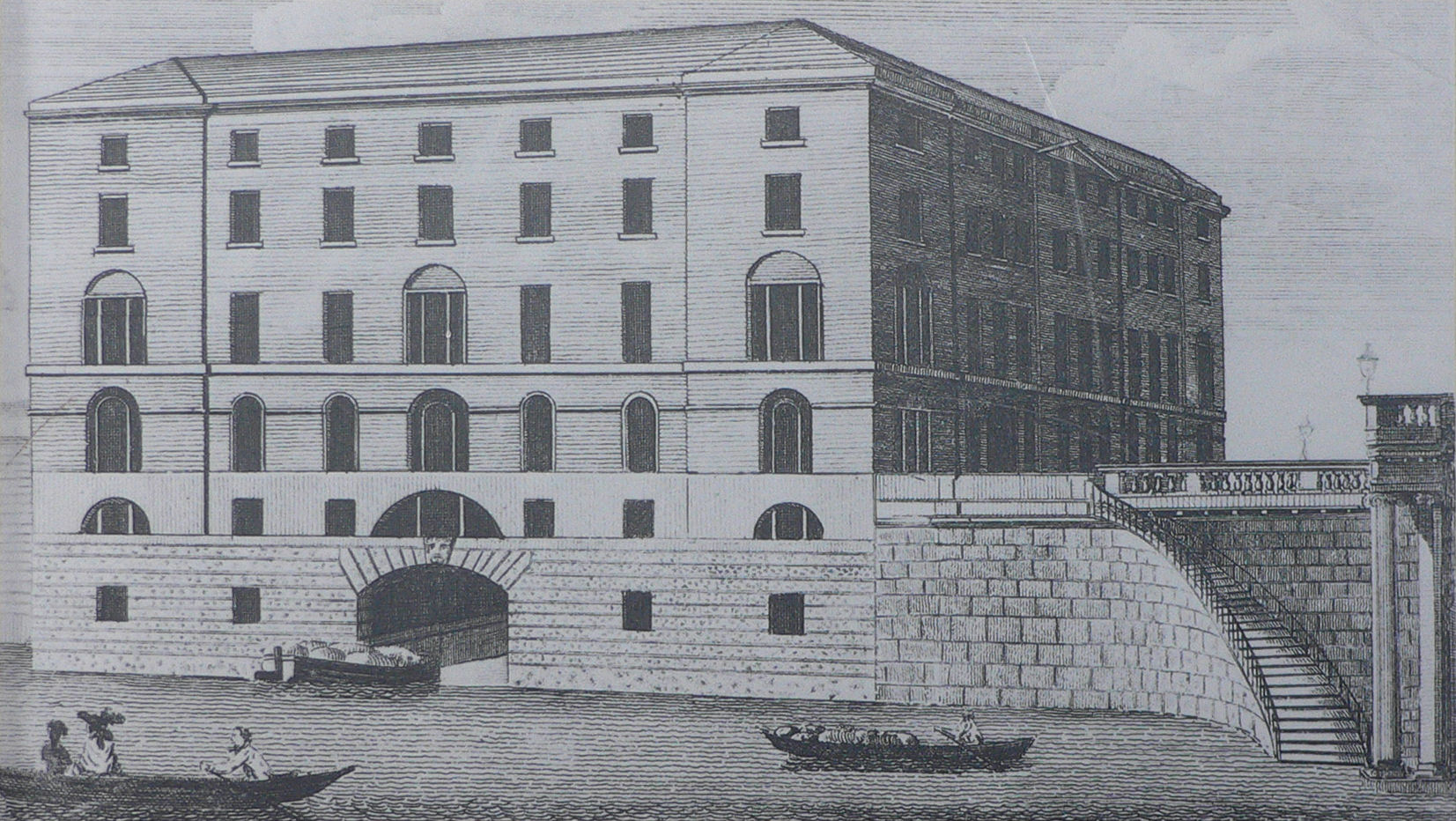
- Albion Flour Mills
- Interactive map of the Albion Mills area

General information
- Location: Christchurch, Surrey, Great Britain
- Coordinates: 51°30′30″N 0°6′10″W
- Opened: 1786
- Closed: 1791

Technical details
- Floor count: Five floors

Design and construction
- Architect: Samuel Wyatt
- Civil engineer: Matthew Boulton, James Watt

Albion Mills was a steam-powered flour mill situated on the southeastern side of Blackfriars Bridge in northern Southwark, London, then in the parish of Christchurch, Surrey. Matthew Boulton began plans for the mill as early as 1783; it was completed in 1786, and gutted by fire in 1791. Most of the notable engineering drawings and depictions of Albion Mills are in the Birmingham Central Library.

== Facility ==
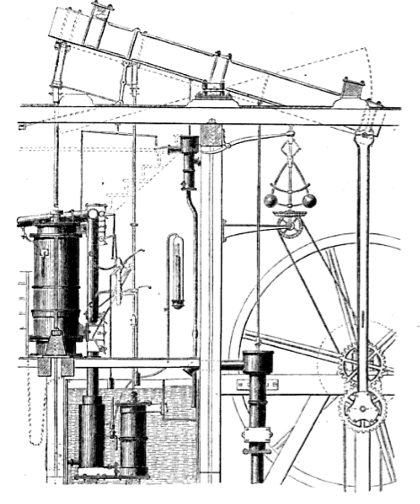
Double-acting engine at Albion Mills

The building was designed by the architect Samuel Wyatt. The engines were supplied with water taken directly from the River Thames. At the time, they were "the most complete and powerful which had been produced by the Soho Manufactory". The mill's wheels and shafts were made of iron. An exception to this were some of the cogs, which were of hard wood, though others were of cast iron, as were the pinions. The teeth, some of wood and others of iron, were manufactured by chipping and filing into epicycloidal shapes. The shafts and axles were made of iron and the bearings of brass. The mill's double engine, producing 50 horsepower (37 kW), drove 20 pairs of millstones, each grinding some nine bushels of corn an hour. It also provided power for raising corn, fanning it to free it of impurities, sifting it, dressing the meal and lowering it into the barges, which made the process more efficient.

== History ==
The mill was built in 1786 by Matthew Boulton, with the backing of City financiers and Joah Bates, an organ player and composer who "embarked all his own money and 10,000/ belonging to his wife" to build it. It was the first steam-powered commercial flour mill in the United Kingdom. James Watt, an associate of Boulton, was personally hired to build a steam engine for the mill to grind corn. Watt's engine was tested before numerous spectators, including Sir Joseph Banks, but encountered problems with the sun and planet gear, and the piston rods. Repairs were completed in April 1786. The cost of erecting the mill proved to be considerably in excess of the original estimate, and Watt soon feared that it would turn out to be a losing concern. He had no doubt that the engines or the machinery would be able to do all that had been promised; but he feared that the absence of business capacity on the part of the managers would be fatal to the mill's commercial success. In September 1786, the Duke of Milan visited the mills.

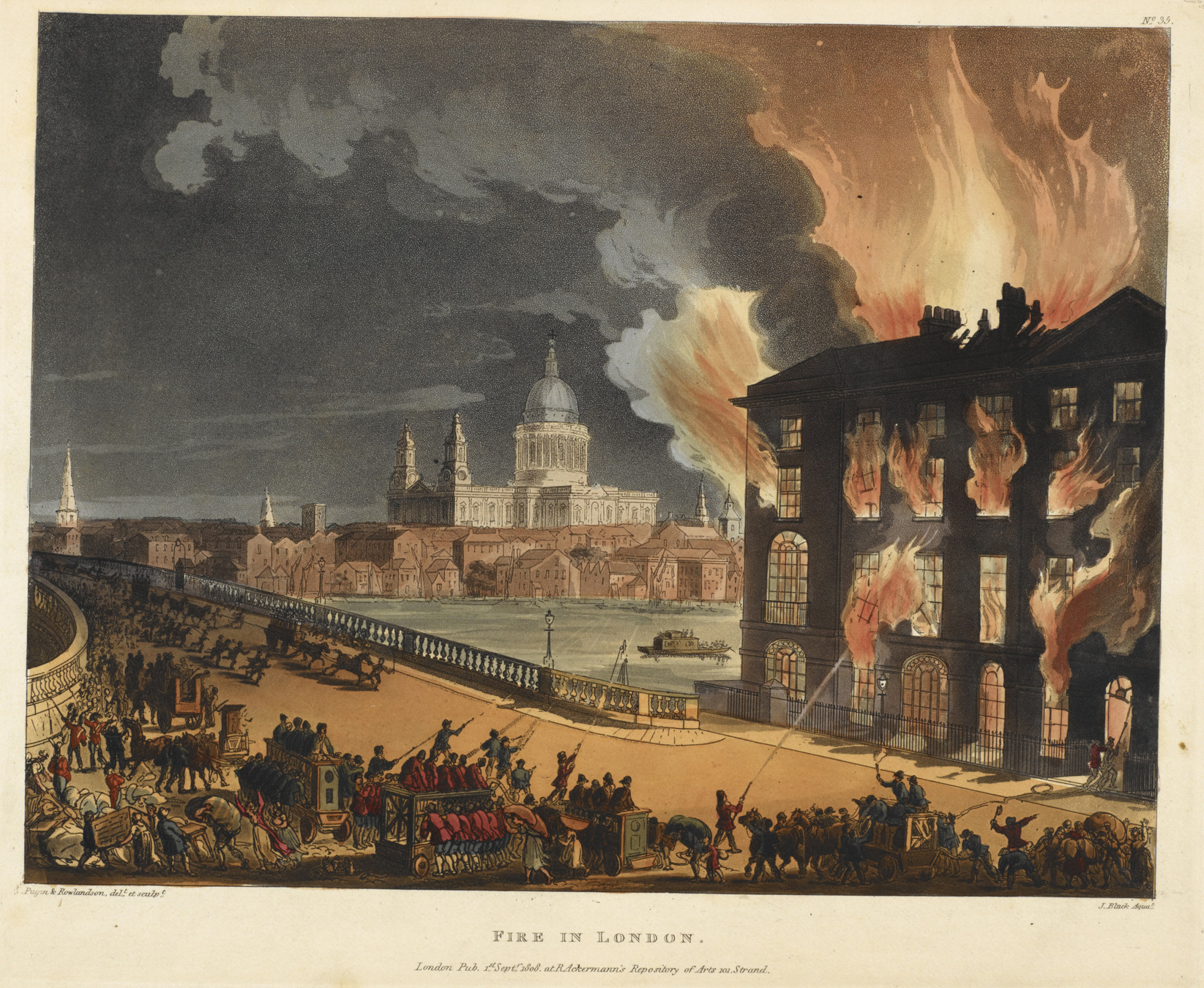
Albion Mills on fire

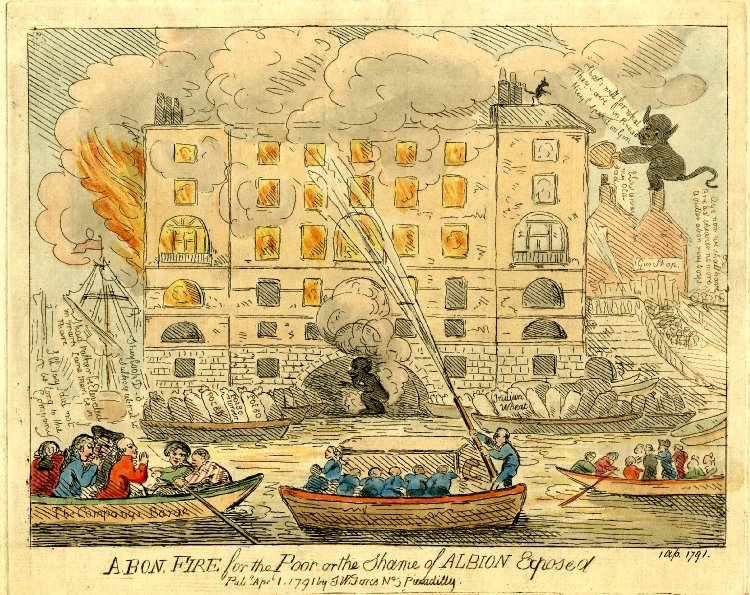
Illustration of the fire by Samuel William Fores, 2 March 1791

By 1789, a second engine had been installed. The business thrived, and by June 1790 the mill was producing sales of £6,800 in flour a week. However, problems remained with its running and maintenance, and Boulton was dissatisfied with the results.

=== Fire ===
At 06:30 on 2 March 1791, a fire gutted the building, devastating Bates financially. The building was completely gutted within two hours. Several houses near the mills were also burnt down. Damage was estimated at £150,000. Over 500 people became unemployed. Arson was strongly suspected, but John Rennie and Wyatt, the manager of the mill, blamed a lack of grease on a corn machine in front of the kiln, and called the fire an accident. In response to the loss of the Albion Mills, the proprietors of mills at Blackwall, Limehouse and Poplar, Middlesex and Rotherhithe, Surrey restarted business, their mills having been idle for more than three years.

The gutting of the mill and the end of a period during which the Albion Mills Company held a virtual monopoly on the London flour market was warmly received by some rivals in London, particularly when plans to build a new engine and mill were eventually rejected and the old mill was converted into houses. According to Graham Gibberd, the Albion Mills building became "London's symbol for the impending industrial revolution", and the shell of the building was the inspiration for William Blake's "dark satanic mills" in his poem And did those feet in ancient time. Most of the notable engineering drawings and depictions of the Albion Mills are in the Boulton & Watt Archive of Birmingham Central Library.
