= Chipping, Lancashire =

Village in Lancashire, England

Coordinates: 53.885°N 2.573°W

Chipping
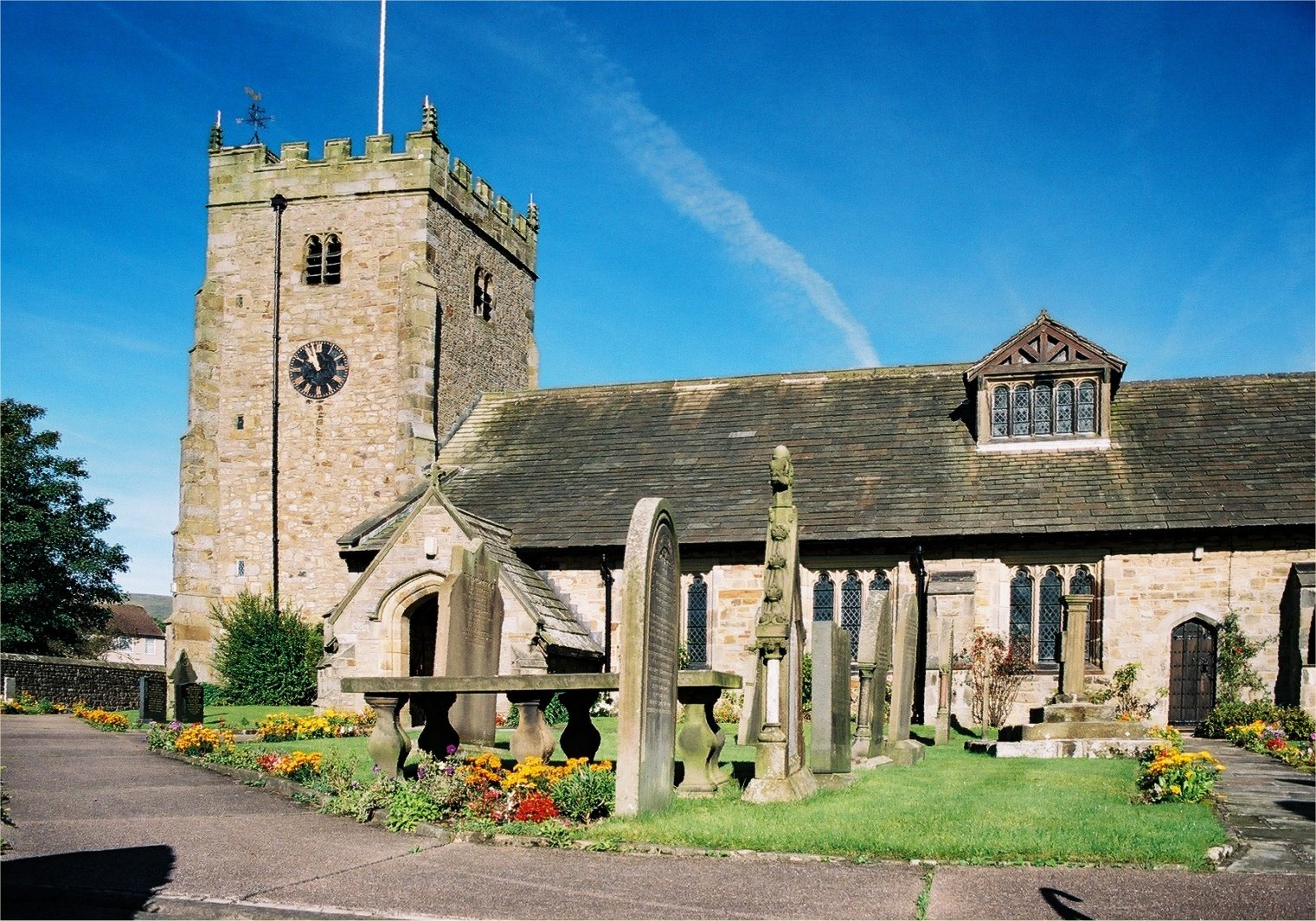
- St Bartholomew's Church

- Location in Ribble Valley Borough Location in the Forest of Bowland Location within Lancashire
- Population: 1,043 (2011 census)
- OS grid reference: SD623434
- Civil parish: Chipping; Bowland-with-Leagram
- District: Ribble Valley
- Shire county: Lancashire
- Region: North West
- Country: England
- Sovereign state: United Kingdom
- Post town: PRESTON
- Postcode district: PR3
- Dialling code: 01995
- Police: Lancashire
- Fire: Lancashire
- Ambulance: North West
- UK Parliament: Ribble Valley

Chipping is a village and civil parish in the borough of Ribble Valley, Lancashire, England, within the Forest of Bowland Area of Outstanding Natural Beauty. Its grid reference is SD6243, and the nearest substantial settlement is Longridge, nearly 4 mi (6.4 km) to the south. In the 2001 census, the parish had a population of 1,046, falling slightly to 1,043 at the 2011 census. The village has won several best-kept village competitions over the years. The village also won the village section of the Royal Horticultural Society Britain in Bloom competition in 2009, picking up RHS Tourism and Gold achievement awards in the process.

== History ==
The village is known to be at least 1,000 years old and is mentioned in Domesday. It lies on the south-western edge of the ancient Forest of Bowland abutting the civil parish of Bowland-with-Leagram. Leagram Park, the site of one of the medieval deer parks of the Forest, is a short drive from the village. Despite this, Chipping was not a part of the ancient Forest and its manor did not fall within the Lordship of Bowland.

In the 1230s, John son of Uctred de Dinckley gave to the Cistercian monks who had founded Sawley Abbey, an area of cleared woodland (a ridding) at Haselhurst. The monks later expanded their landholding in the area. In 1538, after the dissolution of the monasteries, the site was among the former monastic lands owned by Sir Arthur Darcy.

Chipping thrived during the Industrial Revolution, when there were seven mills located along Chipping Brook. The last survivor was Kirk Mill, the chair making factory of HJ Berry, but in 2010 the company went into administration, the factory closed, and on 7 March 2011 the works were bought by 53N Bowland Ltd.

== Toponymy ==
Chipping is named in the Domesday Book as Chippenden; the name is derived from the medieval Chepyn meaning market place. Chipping is a prefix used in a number of place names in England, and is probably derived from ceapen, an Old English word meaning 'marketplace', though the meaning may alternatively come from (or via) the Medieval English word chepynge with a more specific meaning of 'long market square'.

== Local government ==
Chipping is a civil parish, and formerly an ancient parish that also included Thornley-with-Wheatley, which became a separate parish in the 19th century. Chipping was in Clitheroe Rural District from 1894 until the reorganisation of local government in 1974,

It is now in Ribble Valley, a non-metropolitan district formed in 1974. The parish of Chipping is combined, with Bowland-with-Leagram and Bowland Forest High, into the ward of Chipping, which elects one councillor to Ribble Valley Borough Council. Local elections are every four years.

Chipping is part of the Longridge with Bowland ward of Lancashire County Council and is in the Ribble Valley parliamentary constituency. At all three levels of government (district, county and parliament) Chipping is represented by the Conservative Party (as of 2012).

== Religion ==
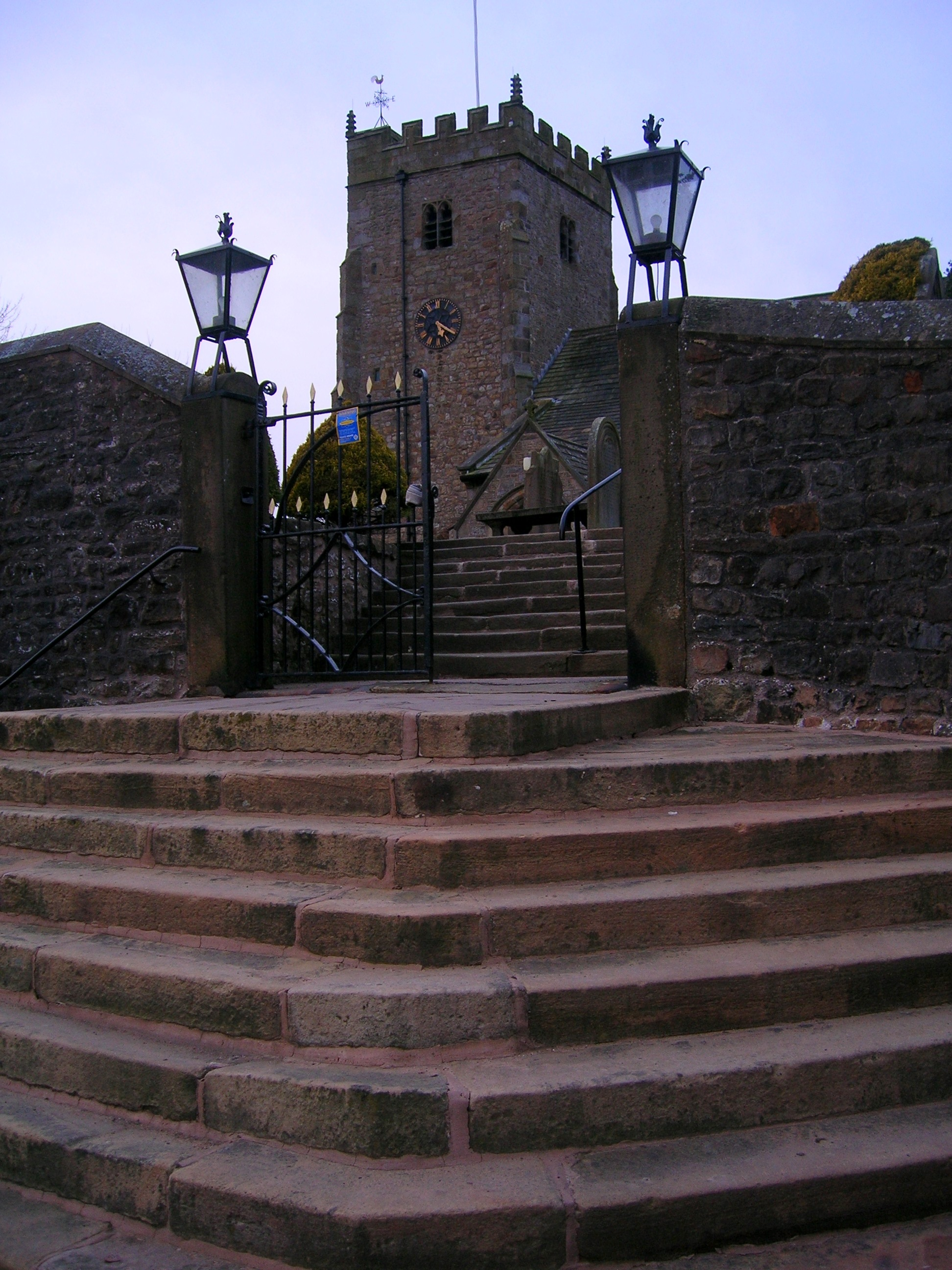
Entrance to St Bartholomew's

The village contains the Anglican Church of St Bartholomew and the Roman Catholic Chapel of St Mary, as well as a Congregational chapel.

=== St Bartholemew's ===
St Bartholomew's is an active Anglican parish church in the deanery of Whalley, the archdeaconry of Blackburn, and the diocese of Blackburn. Its benefice is united with that of St Michael, Whitewell. The church is designated by English Heritage as a Grade II* listed building.

The ancient yew tree in the churchyard is well known in the county and thought to be more than a century old.

=== St Mary's ===
After the Protestant Reformation, it was illegal to practise Catholicism in public, and those who adhered to that faith worshipped in secret, although some local landowners who remained Catholic established centres of worship on their estates. At Chipping, the Welds of Leagram Hall ran such a centre. The 19th century saw the beginnings of Catholic emancipation, and attendance at the chapel at Leagram was permitted. In the 1820s George Weld gave land and money to build an openly Catholic church, St Mary's, in the village, which was constructed at a cost of £1,130 (equivalent to £90,000 in 2025). The current Priest in Charge is Fr. Anthony Grimshaw.

The church organ reputedly came from Stonyhurst College. Dating from the early 18th century, it was built by Bishop Ltd of Ipswich.

=== Congregational Chapel ===
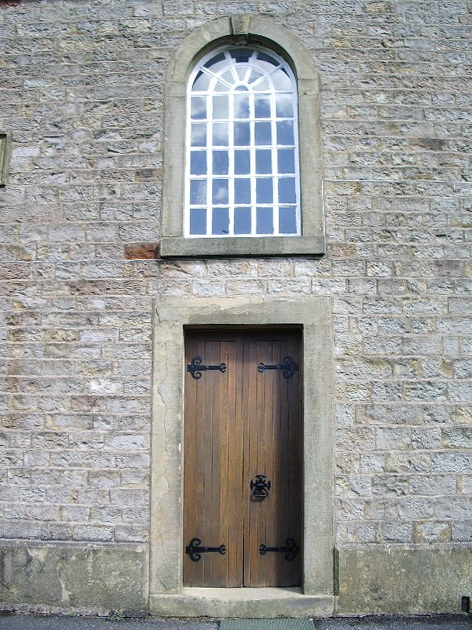
Congregational Church doorway

The Congregational Church was built in 1838 as an independent non-conformist place of worship. A dedication stone carries an inscription: "Provident Chapel erected by subscription MDCCCXXXVIII" (1838). The chapel closed in 1882 but re-opened as a Congregational Church in the early 20th century. The church is currently active and, in January 2014, appointed its first pastor in over 50 years.

== Landmarks ==
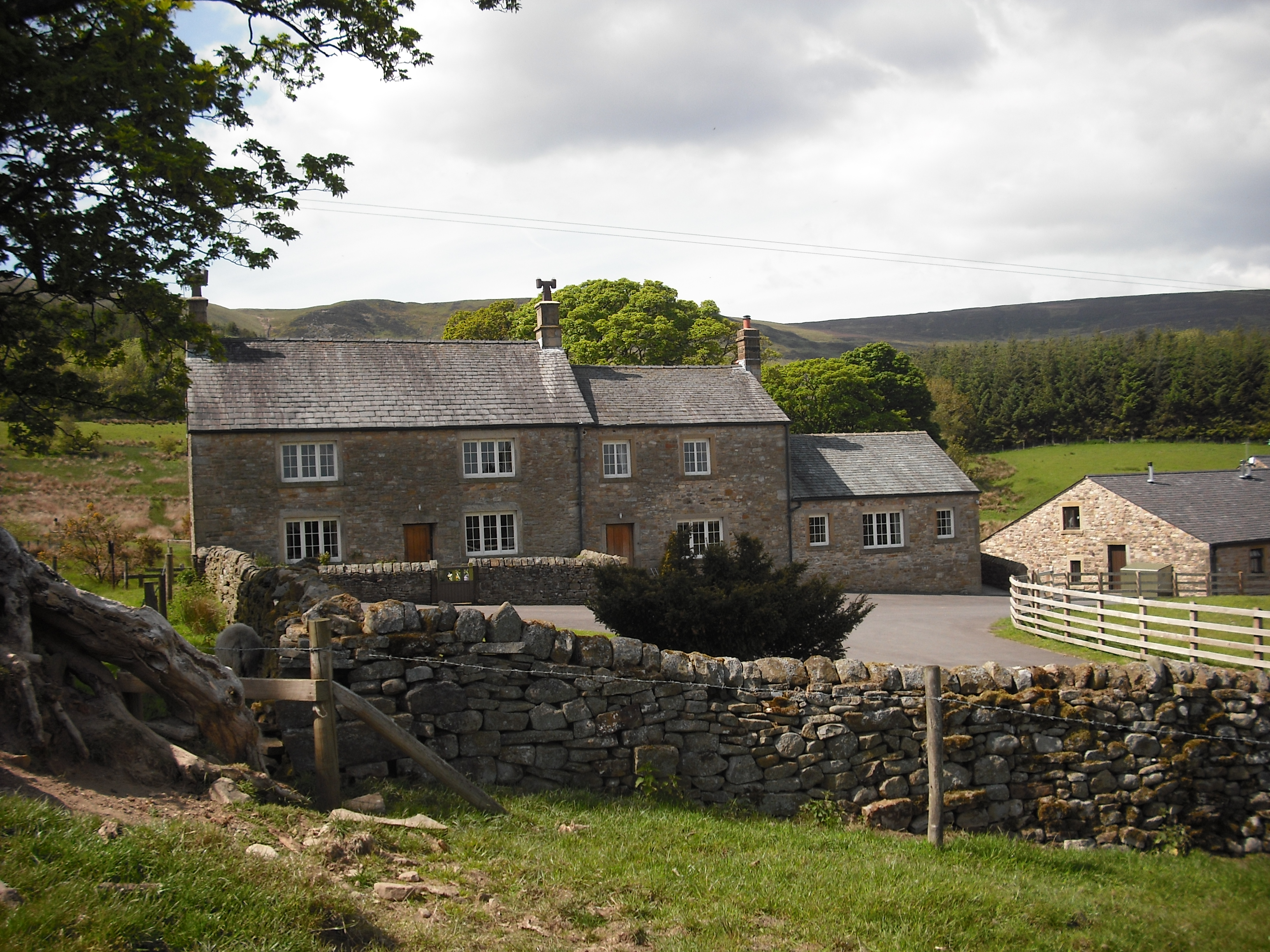
Woolfen Hall

Chipping Craft Centre is said to be the property which has been used as a shop for the longest continuous time in the UK. The first shop was opened at this location in 1668 by a local wool merchant. Since then it has been used as an undertakers, a butchers and most recently as a Post Office, amongst other trades. It is a now a newsagents, tea shop and craft centre, however, and operates as a Post Office only two days a week.

Hesketh End, on Judd Holmes Lane in the village, is a Grade I listed building, dating from 1591 and the early 17th century, restored in 1907. Woolfen Hall, at the foot of nearby Parlick, is a Grade II listed building, possibly 16th-century but altered in 1867–8.

== Education ==
The village has two primary schools: St Marys RC and Brabin's Endowed School. Brabin's Endowed was established in 1684.

== Culture and amenities ==
Chipping has its own local history society. Its archive, which contains Census Records, Graveyard Records, old documents, miscellaneous records and many old photographs of the local area, is available for private study, at St Mary’s Community Hall, Longridge Road, on the first Sunday of certain months and at other times by prior appointment.

Chipping Agricultural Show is a local country show that was first held in 1920. The show celebrates all aspects of farming and rural life with classes for sheep, cattle, light horses, ponies and shire horses plus poultry, pigeon and egg sections. There are also competitions for cheeses, handicrafts, cakes and preserves, a large horticultural section plus children's, dog and baby sections.

Originally held in 1998 and intended as a one-off fund raising event for a new Village Hall, Chipping Steam Fair has now become a firm fixture in the village calendar. The fair now regularly attracts around 20,000 visitors and upward of 500 exhibitors over the Spring Bank Holiday weekend each May.

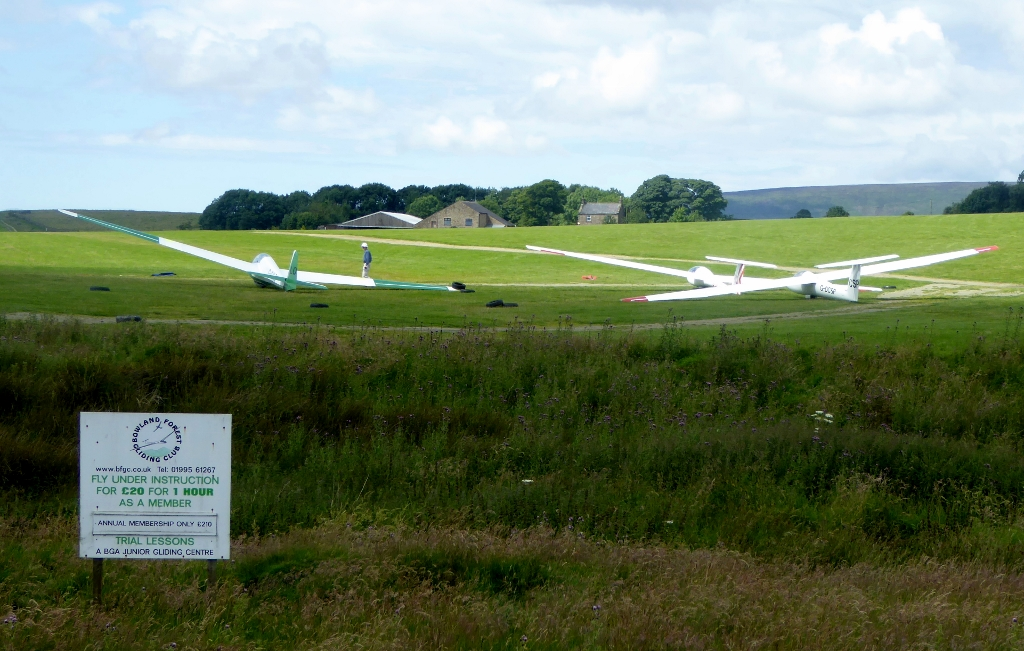
Bowland Forest Gliding Club, looking northwest

One mile to the west of the village is Bowland Forest Gliding Club, GB-0339, which is used by winch-launched gliders.

The village has three public houses. The Sun is situated at the corner of Windy Street and Garstang Lane and The Tillotson's Arms is situated on Talbot Street. The Talbot Arms, also on Talbot Street, is currently closed for refurbishment. The Sun is reputed to be haunted by the ghost of scullery maid Lizzie Dean, who hung herself in the attic of the pub on 5 November 1835. She is buried at the entrance to the churchyard. Also in the locality is the Gibbon Bridge Hotel.

The village's environmentally friendly public toilets won the best in Lancashire award at the county's Best Kept Village competition every year since a renovation in 2009 until 2014.

== Geography ==
Just to the north of the village the Forest of Bowland access areas of Clougha, Fair Snape, Wolf Fell and Saddle Fell have been opened up to the public by access agreements negotiated between Lancashire County Council and the owners. This means that over 3,260 acres (13.2 km^{2}) of open country are now open to walkers.

== Transport ==
Bus routes operated by Vision Bus connect Chipping to Blackburn, Clitheroe and Longridge.

== In fiction ==
The Spook's series by Joseph Delaney, frequently features the village of Chipenden, which is based on the village of Chipping.

== See also ==
- Listed buildings in Chipping, Lancashire
- Toponymy of England
- List of generic forms in British place names
