= Sinai Park House =

Farmhouse in Shobnall, Staffordshire, England

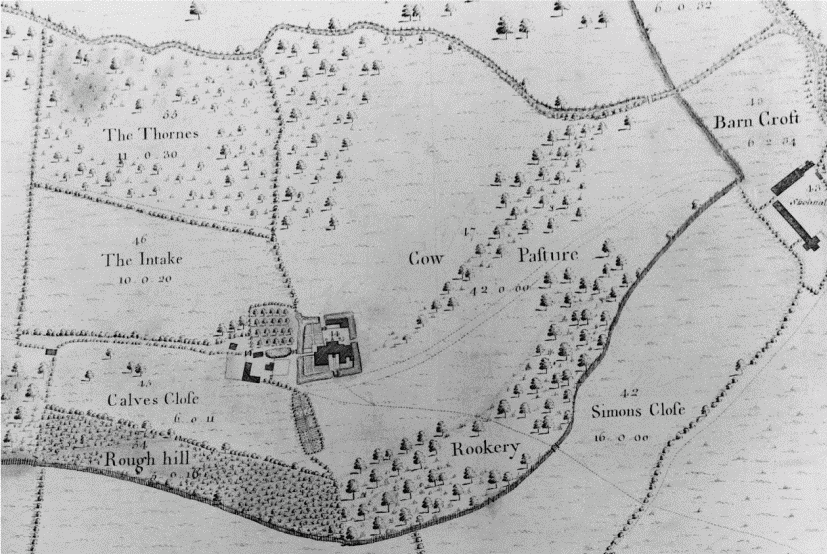
- Sinai Park House and estate on a map from the late 1750s

- Location within Staffordshire

General information
- Location: near Burton on Trent, Staffordshire, England
- Coordinates: 52°48′18″N 01°40′18″W
- Owner: Kate Murphy

Website
- sinaiparkhouse.co.uk

Listed Building – Grade II*
- Official name: Sinai Park
- Designated: 17 September 1952
- Reference no.: 1038484

Scheduled monument
- Official name: Sinai Park moated site
- Designated: 18 January 1994
- Reference no.: 1011068

Sinai Park House is a grade II* listed building in Burton upon Trent, Staffordshire, England. Consisting of a central range with two wings, the building is sited on a ridge of high ground near a chalybeate spring. The earliest remains of the site date to the 13th century, and it was occupied by the de Scobenhal family before being donated to Burton Abbey. The house was used as a place of convalescence for monks recovering from blood-letting procedures and its original name "seyney house" derived from the Old French "seyne" for blood. The estate was increased by enclosure and used as a hunting ground for the abbot. Much of the estate and house were let out by the early 16th century. The estate came into the hands of the Paget family after the Dissolution of the Monasteries. The Pagets used it for hunting and let out part of the estate to farmers. The house adopted its modern name of Sinai by the end of the 18th century, a biblical reference.

The estate was sold to pay off the debts of the eccentric Henry Paget, 5th Marquess of Anglesey, and by 1918 was used as a cooperative society farm. The house later served as billets for Royal Air Force personnel and was split into cottages before being abandoned due to a contaminated water supply. It was used by a farmer as a house for pigs and chickens before being sold in 1995 to the current owner, who has renovated one wing of the house. Planning permission has been granted to restore further parts of the estate and install an outdoor classroom.

== Description ==
Sinai Park House sits on top of a ridge of high ground to the west of Burton upon Trent, Staffordshire in what Historic England have described as a "magnificent and prominent setting above the Trent Valley". The house is surrounded by a rectangular moat measuring 50 by 60 metres (160 ft × 200 ft) on a northwest–southeast alignment. The moat is partially silted but the southern and northern corners still hold water. The moat is up to 10 metres (33 ft) wide; it is 2.5 metres (8.2 ft) deep on the northwest and southwest faces and 1.5 metres (4.9 ft) deep on the southeast and northeast faces. The moat is crossed by a brick-built bridge, dating to 1732, at the centre of the south-eastern face.

The surviving structure dates from the early 16th century and is u-shaped in plan, with the open face to the south. It is a timber-frame structure, with infills of brick or lath and plaster, with a tiled roof. There are brick and sandstone side stack chimneys on the east, north and west faces. The central range is of two storeys and has four windows per floor on each face, a two-storey entrance porch is located in the centre of the south face. The two wings are also of two storeys, with an additional attic with dormer windows. The upper floors of the structure are canted outwards. The interior shows little evidence of its original design but some renaissance-style paintings of birds and plants survive on the plaster of the easternmost ground floor room.

== Monastic use ==
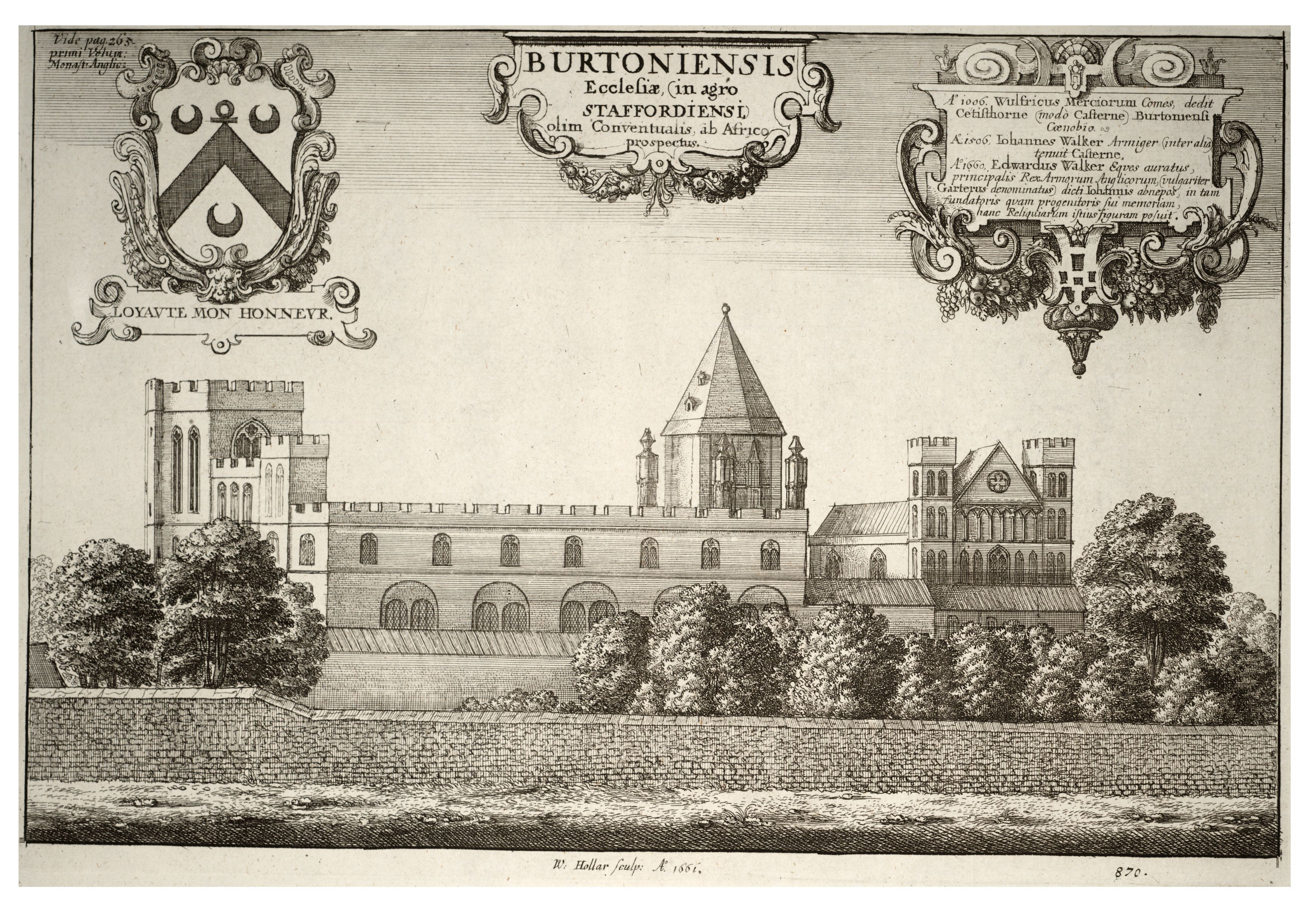
The church of the Burton Abbey, pictured in 1661

The site is thought likely to have been occupied at an early period of history due to the presence of a natural chalybeate (iron-bearing) spring. However, the earliest proven evidence of occupation is the moat and some of the surviving cellar stonework which date to the 13th century. The site lay was occupied by the de Scobenhal (or Schobenhale) family, after whom it was named Shobnall Park; the surrounding area is still known as Shobnall. The family donated the site to the monks of Burton Abbey who used it as a "seyney house", a place of convalescence and a site to recuperate from blood-letting sessions. The word "seyney" derives from the Old French "seyne" meaning blood. The house became known as the Seyney House sometime between 1410 and 1529. The site was one of only a handful of seyney houses known in England and it retained this use until at least the 1380s.

The house was originally just a central hall with a cross passage; though at some point it probably had a screens passage entrance at the west end. The hall was later remodelled with a central entrance via a porch with upper stories added around the same time. The abbey relocated two timber-framed buildings from Burton to the site to form two structurally separate dormitory wings either side of the hall. The house had an oratory by 1410 when it was granted the right to hold the eucharist there. The house ceased to be used by the monks in the early 16th century when it was let out; it is possibly the "Great Lodge" recorded as let by the Abbey in 1537.

The moat around the house may have been L-shaped during this period, covering only the north and west sides of the property. Access during this time was via a wooden bridge. The surrounding parkland was fenced at some point between 1410 and 1529, probably when previously common land to the west was incorporated into the park. A payment of five shillings was made annually by the Abbey to the parishes of Barton-under-Needwood and of Rolleston as compensation for the loss of pastureland. The park was probably used as a hunting ground by the abbot and deer were first recorded there in 1532. The park was rented out for herbage and pannage at a rate of £8 per year by 1536.

== Paget family ==
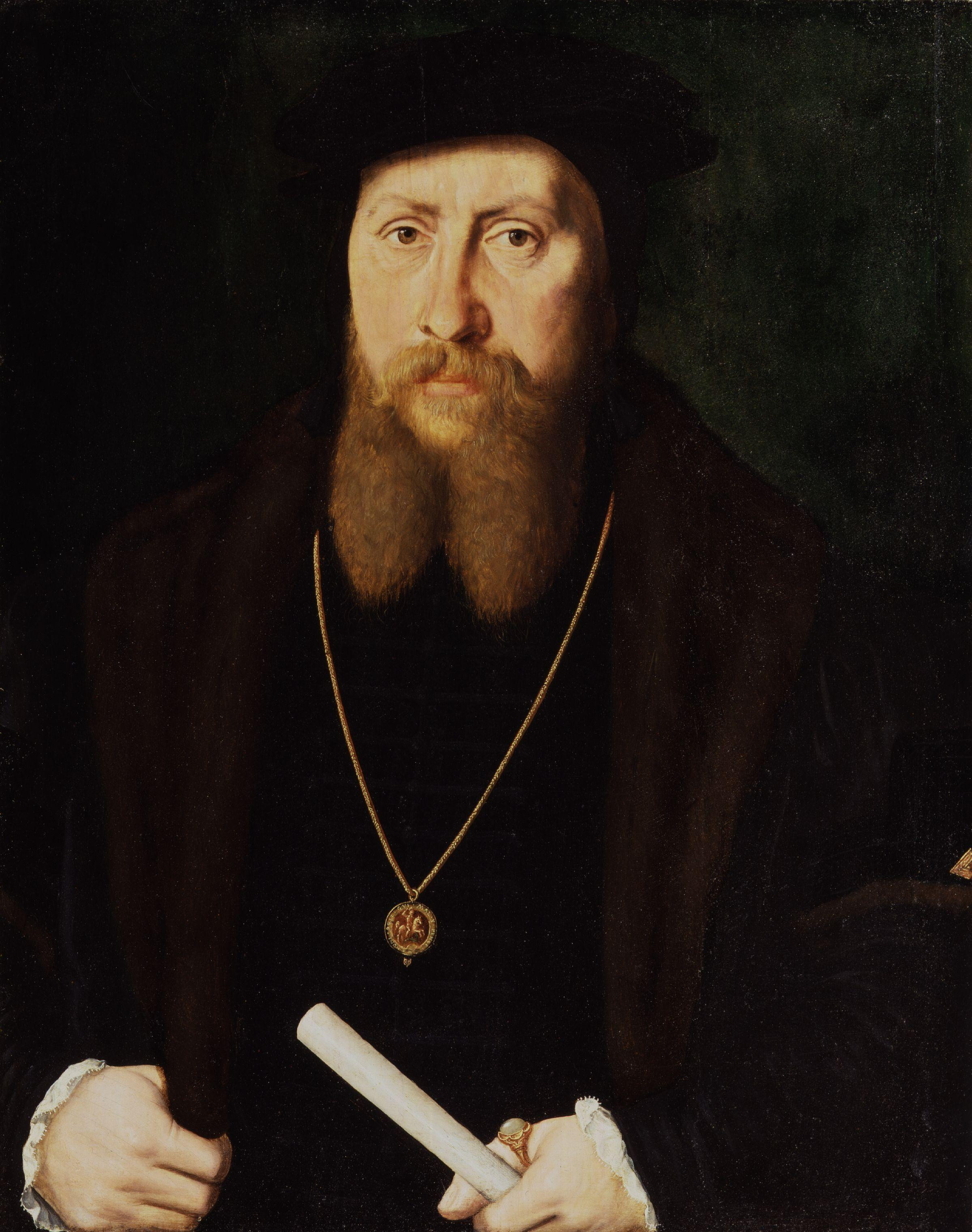
William Paget

After the Dissolution of the Monasteries stripped it from Burton Abbey by 1546 the estate had been given to the Paget family, Sir William Paget being a close adviser of Henry VIII. The rental income increased to £20 in 1549 and was £72 by the late 1630s. The Pagets used the estate, which had around 60 acres (24 ha) of woodland in 1547, as a hunting lodge and had 400 deer in the park by 1585. The Elizabethan courtier Robert Devereux, 2nd Earl of Essex hunted on the estate. It is possible that an earlier southern range existed, but had been demolished by 1573; the Paget family funded the rebuilding of the main hall in 1606, reusing earlier timbers. The family exercised horses on a grassed section to the east of the park in the 1630s. In 1637 300 Irish sheep were introduced, but the Pagets banned the raising of sheep by their tenants in 1668.

The house was known as Seney Hall in 1649 and Seaney Lodge by 1668. From this time it was let by the Pagets to a series of their bailiffs and park keepers until 1777 when it was known as Seaney Park House. At the start of the 18th century the park boasted 2,000 trees but large numbers were felled in 1744 and 1771 and the park was afterwards turned to arable use. The park extended over 486 acres (197 ha) by the late 1750s; a pheasant house had been added in 1746 and the deer were removed to the Paget estate at Beaudesert in the early 1770s. The moat had been extended to completely encircle the house in the 17th or 18th century. The 1750s saw an extensive remodelling of the house with a new sitting room and staircase built and sash windows installed. Additional buildings were also built to the north but have since been demolished.

From the late 18th century the estate was rented out to a number of merchants and farmers. By 1796 it had settled on the modern spelling of Sinai Park, apparently coined by William Burton in 1622 as an allusion to the Biblical wilderness which he alleged the estate resembled. In the Georgian era a plunge pool, fed by the chalybeate spring, was installed and said to have healing properties; on later maps it is labelled as the "Lord's Well". The house's porch was refurbished in the 19th century with a new facing, set in from the timbers, and three casement windows installed. The last Paget owner was the eccentric Henry Paget, 5th Marquess of Anglesey, the estate was sold to pay off his debts.

== Dilapidation ==
Sinai Park House on an 1892-1914 map, showing the new farm buildings constructed to the west

The house with 193 acres (78 ha) of arable land and 38 acres (15 ha) of woodland was sold to the Burton and District Co-operative Society in June 1918. A modern farmhouse was built nearby and the land managed as farmland. At some point the house was used as a billet for Royal Air Force servicemen; RAF Tatenhill was located nearby. The house received protection as a grade II* listed building on 17 September 1952. Derelict by 1984. The structure was converted to six cottages by the 1960s but was abandoned after the water supply was found to have become contaminated. The farmer afterwards used the structure to house pigs and chickens. The internal fixtures were sold with the wood panelling being exported to the United States and a Tudor-era door being sold to the Stanhope Arms public house in nearby Bretby, Derbyshire.

== Ongoing restoration ==
The house was sold in 1988 with 2.5 acres (1.0 ha) of land. In November 1988 an archaeological investigation was carried out to the moat. Mechanical excavations were made across seven sections, these found that the earliest extant remains dated from the 16th century, but that earlier remains could have been removed by regular contemporary cleaning of the moat. The excavation established that the moat has been partially filled on the northwest face and the original side slope would have been close to the northern wall of the house. The moat was listed as a scheduled monument on 18 January 1994; the listing included all of the ground under the site of the house.

The house was purchased by Kate Murphy around 1995. At the time it was in a derelict condition and had been described as "the most important house in England to be in such a state". Murphy restored the eastern wing of the house, where she now lives and is planning to convert the structure into bed and breakfast accommodation. In 2020 Murphy sought National Lottery funding to restore the remainder of the house, install an outdoor classroom and refurbish the plunge pool. Planning permission for the proposals was granted in April 2020.

In 2022, the house was featured on an episode of the Discovery Channel's "Expedition Unknown: Knights Templar Treasure Hunt" (Season 10, Ep. 5).

== See also ==
- Listed buildings in Shobnall
