= Bond End Canal =

Canal in Staffordshire, England (1775–1874)

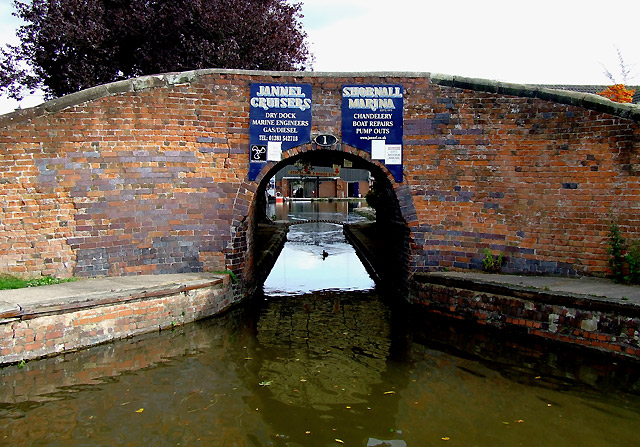
- The entrance to Shobnall Basin, pictured in 2009
- Interactive map of Bond End Canal

Specifications
- Length: 1.5 miles (2.4 km)
- Locks: 2 (originally 1)
- Status: Closed

History
- Date completed: 1775
- Date closed: 1874

Geography
- Start point: Bond End; 52.8006°N 1.6287°W
- End point: Shobnall Basin; 52.8065°N 1.6557°W
- Connects to: Trent and Mersey Canal; Peel's Cut, River Trent

The Bond End Canal was a canal in Burton-on-Trent, Staffordshire, England. It was built in 1774–75 by the Burton Boat Company who operated the Trent Navigation between Wilden Ferry and Burton and who feared that the Trent and Mersey Canal would threaten their trade (the canal joined the river downstream of Wilden Ferry and ran via Burton to North West England). The Bond End Canal ran between the Trent at Bond End, near the town centre, and a basin adjacent to the Trent and Mersey Canal at Shobnall. Originally cargo had to be unloaded to pass between vessels on the two canals but in 1794 permission was granted for a lock to provide direct passage between the two. The Trent and Mersey Canal eventually won the battle for trade and the Trent Navigation was abandoned by the 1810s.

The Bond End Canal remained in use until the 1860s. In 1874 the Midland Railway received permission to build a branch line along the route of the canal. They retained the lock at Shobnall as an interchange between the railway and the Trent and Mersey Canal but most of the Bond End Canal was infilled by 1900. After nationalisation the lock at Shobnall was purchased and converted into a marina and chandlery. After the branch line fell into disuse much of the route of the Bond End Canal now forms the alignment of the A5189 Evershed Way.

== Background and construction ==
William Paget, 6th Baron Paget and his successors had the right under the River Trent Navigation Act 1698 (10 Will. 3. c. 26) to make the River Trent navigable from Wilden Ferry to Bond End in Burton on Trent, and to charge a toll on freight. The rights over the Trent Navigation were leased to the Burton Boat Company who profited from the movement of hops, grain and malt for the brewers of Burton as well as cheese, pottery, iron and timber. The Trent and Mersey Canal was built from 1766, eventually providing a navigable route for narrowboats from Derwent Mouth, just downstream of Wilden Ferry, through Burton to North West England.

The Burton Boat Company was concerned that the new canal would threaten their existing trade. They had tried to persuade the Trent and Mersey Canal's engineer James Brindley to make the connection to the Trent at Bond End and use the Trent Navigation for downstream trade. Brindley refused because fluctuating river levels made the navigation less reliable than a continuation of the canal. The Burton Boat Company then resolved to make their own connection to the Trent and Mersey Canal and provided finance of £3,600 to run a widebeam canal the 1.5 miles (2.4 km) from Bond End to the Trent and Mersey basin at Shobnall. The canal ran entirely on land owned by Henry Paget, Lord Paget and without benefit of an act of Parliament, commonly used for other navigation works. The Bond End Canal has sometimes been referred to as a branch of the Trent and Mersey Canal but this is incorrect as they were always in separate ownership. The construction works were completed between 1774 and 1775.

The Bond End Canal originally had just one lock at the point of connection to the River Trent, on Peel's Cut, which was also the site of a basin and wharves for transfer from the Trent Navigation. The Trent and Mersey Canal refused permission for a direct connection between the two waterways and so a physical separation between the two was maintained at what became known as the Shobnall Bar. This required cargo to be unloaded and transferred manually between vessels on the two canals.

== Construction and operation ==
The Bond End Canal provided a useful link between the Trent and Mersey Canal and many of Burton's breweries which were located closer to the River Trent, generally around the town's High Street. The canal facilitated the shipment of beer to Hull and Liverpool. Lord Paget leased rights over the canal to the Burton Boat Company which ran its own fleet on the canal and maintained depots as far afield as Birmingham. The Shobnall Bar proved such an inconvenience that one night the company attempted to break through the bar, leading to a legal dispute with the Trent and Mersey Canal and its quick reinstatement. In 1794 the Trent and Mersey Canal permitted the two canals to be joined by a lock at Shobnall with a 3 feet 9 inches (1.14 m) drop. Despite this the battle for trade between the two canals was won by the Trent and Mersey by the turn of the 19th century. The Burton Boat Company fleet ceased operation in 1805 and most other waterborne traffic on the Trent above Wilden Ferry ceased. The Trent Navigation ceased to be navigable in the 1810s, though the Burton Boat Company's lease on it did not expire until 1849.

The Bond End Canal survived for longer than the Trent Navigation and in 1843 a system was installed at the Bond End lock to help flush the town's main sewer which had been liable to blockages. Whenever the lock was operated, which was then around twelve times per day, water would be discharged into the sewer. The canal saw occasional use by flyboats as late as the 1860s.

== Abandonment and legacy ==
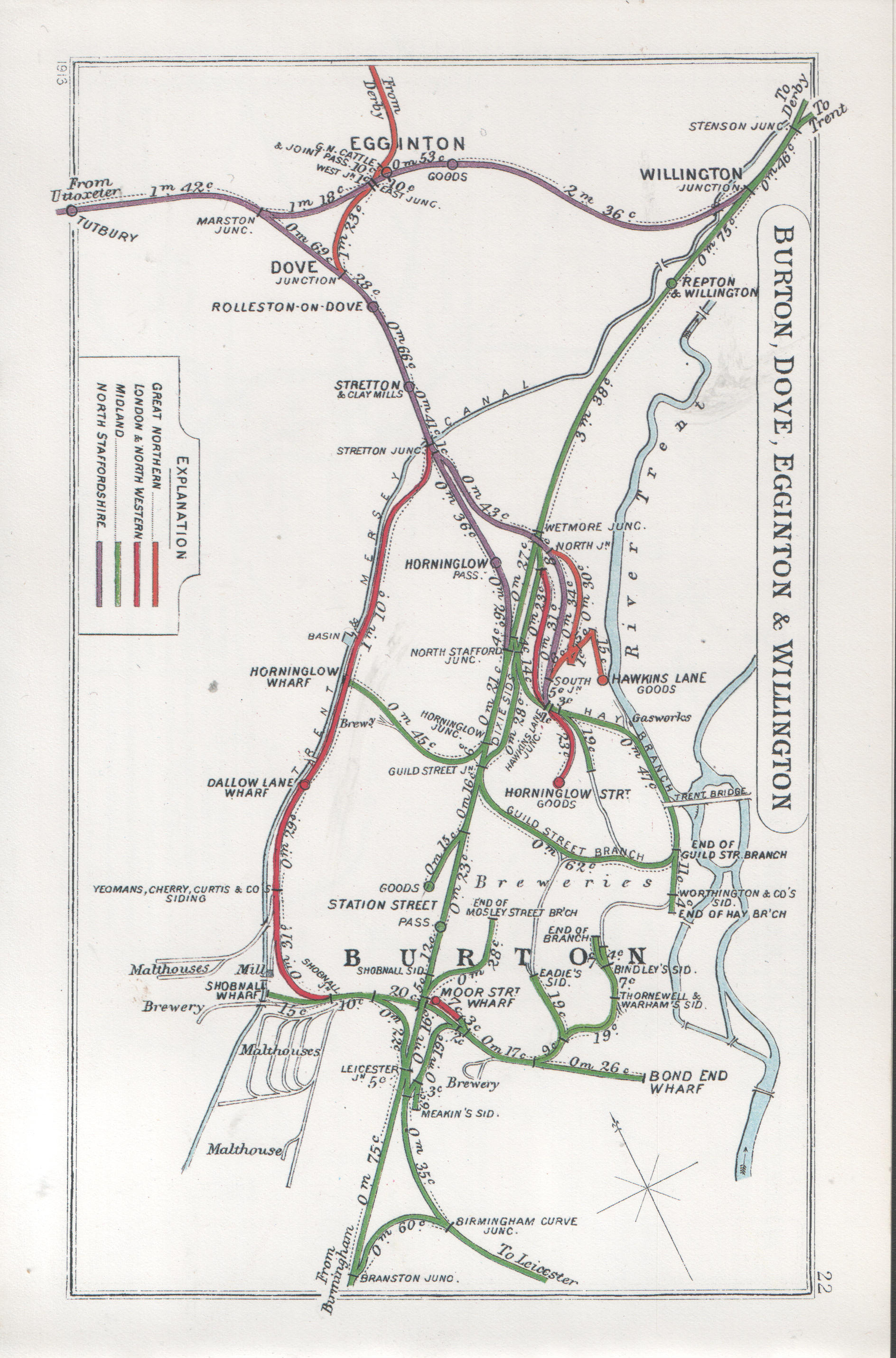
A 1913/14 railway map showing the line running between Bond End Wharf and Shobnall Wharf at the lower end of the image. This is the approximate route of the Bond End Canal. The Trent and Mersey Canal runs along the left hand side of the image and the River Trent along the right side.

After it fell out of use the route of Bond End Canal was used by the Midland Railway for its Shobnall and Bond End branches which were authorised by the Midland Railway (Additional Powers) Act 1874 (37 & 38 Vict. c. clx) and completed by 1875. The railway began filling the canal before the act was passed, with works beginning at the Shobnall end. The lock at Shobnall was retained to act as a wharf to interchange cargo between the railway and the Trent and Mersey Canal. The rival North Staffordshire Railway petitioned the Court of Referees in opposition of the bill, contending that the Bond End Canal was not altogether abandoned, though admitting that it was "seldom used". Most of the line of the former canal had been infilled by 1900.

Shobnall Basin remained in the ownership of the Midland Railway and its successor the London, Midland and Scottish Railway before passing into the possession of British Rail at nationalisation in 1948. In the early 1970s the basin was purchased by the Hines family who persuaded British Waterways, the post-nationalisation operator of the Thames and Mersey canal to cancel plans to demolish the bridge carrying their towpath across the entrance to the basin. The Hines family extended the basin along the former line of the Bond End Canal and it now provides berths for 52 boats as well as facilities for a dry dock, boat surveyor and chandlery. The branch railway over the line of the Bond End Canal also fell into disuse and in the 1980s the A5189 Evershed Way was built on much of the route.
