= Immanuel Church, Oswaldtwistle =

Coordinates: 53.7360°N 2.4059°W

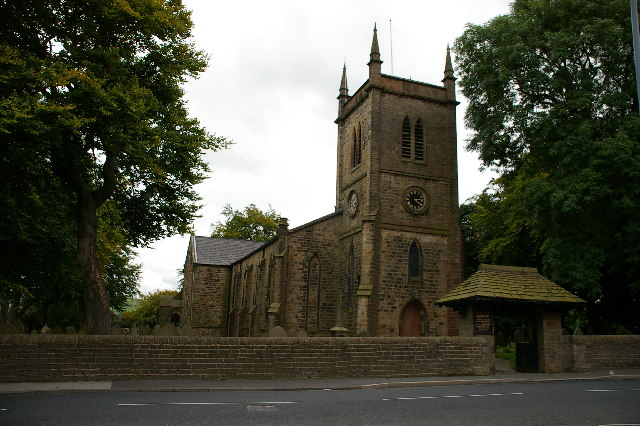
- Immanuel Church from the west

- Location in Hyndburn
- OS grid reference: SD 73324 26699
- Location: Oswaldtwistle, Lancashire
- Country: England
- Denomination: Anglican

History
- Status: Parish church

Architecture
- Functional status: Active
- Heritage designation: Grade II

Administration
- Province: York
- Diocese: Blackburn
- Archdeaconry: Blackburn
- Deanery: Accrington

Immanuel Church is an Anglican church in Oswaldtwistle, Lancashire, England. It is an active parish church in the Diocese of Blackburn and the archdeaconry of Blackburn. It was built 1836–1837, designed by J. and T. Stones, and has been designated a Grade II listed building by English Heritage.

== History and administration ==
Immanuel Church was built 1836–1837 to a design by J. and T. Stones. In 1866–1867 J. & J. M. Hay added a chancel, transepts, a chapel and an organ chamber. In 1911, St Mary's Church, Cocker Brook, St Andrew's Church, Hippings, and St Michael's Church, Belthorn were all chapels of ease to Immanuel.

Immanuel was designated a Grade II listed building by English Heritage on 9 March 1984. The Grade II listing—the lowest of the three grades—is for buildings that are "nationally important and of special interest". An active church in the Church of England, Immanuel is part of the diocese of Blackburn, which is in the Province of York. It is in the archdeaconry of Blackburn, the Deanery of Accrington and in 2017 became part of the new parish of Oswaldtwistle, along with St. Paul's and All Saints.

== Architecture ==
Immanuel Church is constructed in the Early English style of coursed stone, squared sandstone; the roofs are slate. The plan is cruciform with a nave, chancel, transepts, tower to the west and chapel to the south-east. The tower is of three stages with buttresses and lancet arches. The nave is also buttressed. There are lancet windows in the nave, chancel and transepts.

There is stained glass by Morris & Co. and Shrigley and Hunt.

== See also ==
- Listed buildings in Oswaldtwistle
