= Peel's Cut =

Canal in England

Coordinates: 52°47′54″N 1°37′51″W

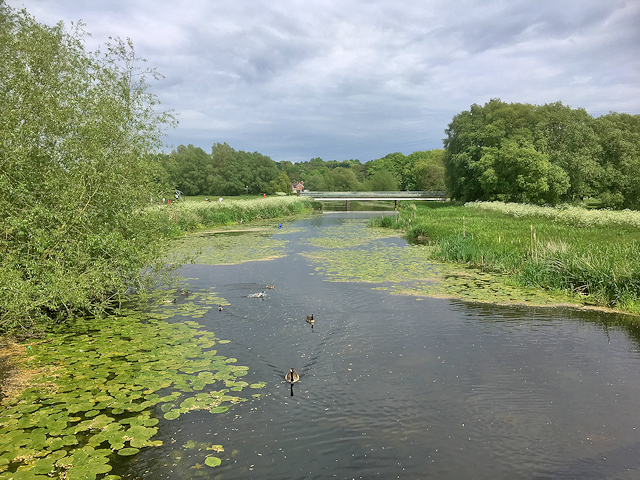
A stretch of the natural river now known as Peel's Cut in 2017, including the Andresey Bridge

Peel's Cut is a man-made waterway connected to the River Trent in Burton on Trent, Staffordshire, in England. It was originally constructed by Robert "Parsley" Peel in the early 1780s to drive a cotton mill. The mill closed in 1849 and the cut was largely filled in during the late 1960s. The name has since been extended to a section of the River Trent to the north, formerly known as the Fleet.

== History ==
Peel's Cut was excavated on the orders of Robert "Parsley" Peel in the early 1780s. Peel was originally from Lancashire where he had built up a cotton spinning, weaving and dyeing business in Lancashire based on Richard Arkwright's factory system. He expanded his business to Burton on Trent from 1779; his son, Robert Peel developed the business further and became a member of parliament; his grandson, also Robert Peel, served twice as home secretary and twice as prime minister of the United Kingdom. According to Peel's grandson Laurence Peel the canal cost £9,000.

Peel's Cut originally ran from a point on the west bank of the River Trent near to the boundary with Branston and turned to run parallel to the river until it met the Fleet, a branch of the Trent that ran between the town of Burton and the Ox Hay and Andresey islands. A weir near to the upstream (Branston) end of the cut directed water into it and the flow was used by Peel to drive machinery at his Bond End cotton mill. The cut was dug under a sub-lease from Samuel Lloyd who held the navigation rights to the Trent in the area.

In the 1790s the line of a canal was surveyed by William Jessop, James Barnes, Robert Whitworth and John Varley from the southern end of Peel's Cut to the Swadlincote and Newhall collieries but did not come to fruition. Around 1797 the Bond End Canal was constructed joining Peel's Cut at the site of the cotton mill to the Trent and Mersey Canal at Shobnall; the canal fell into disuse and was filled in the 19th century. The River Trent itself ceased to be navigable at Burton around 1819.

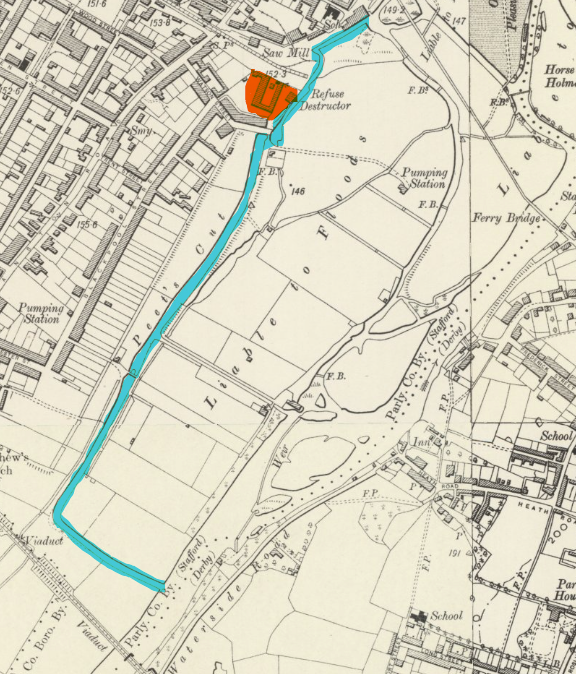
Peel's Cut (blue) and Bond End Mill (red) on an 1888–1915 map

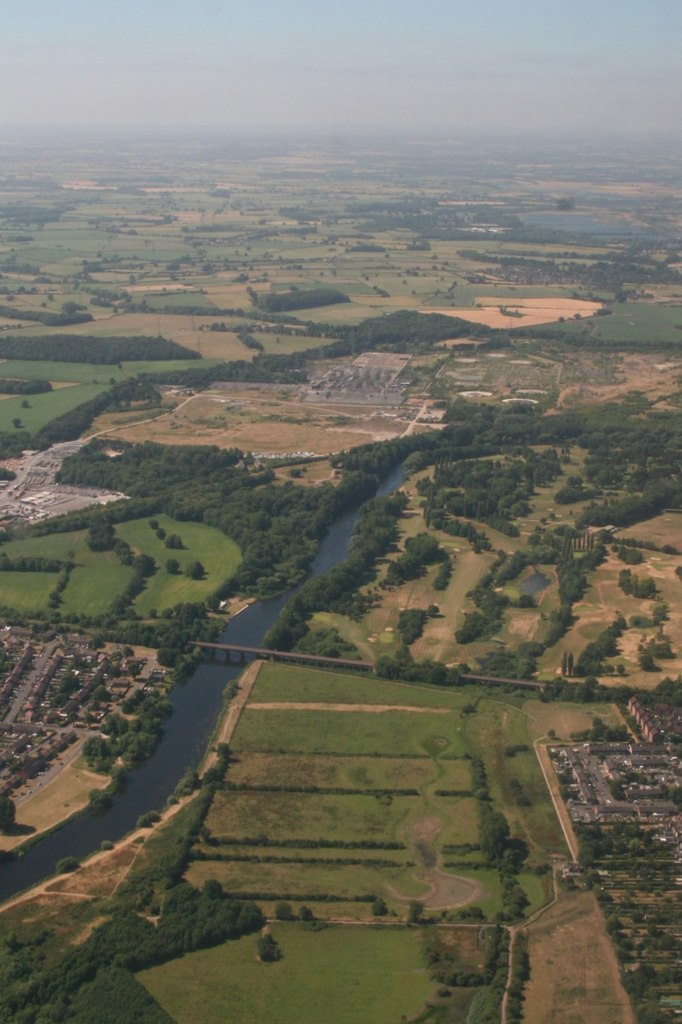
The now filled-in section of Peel's Cut ran not far from the bottom right of the photo next to the gardens towards the middle before turning left along where the lighter coloured line of vegetation can be seen to join the Trent. This is a reverse angle of the diagram above.

== Closure and current position ==
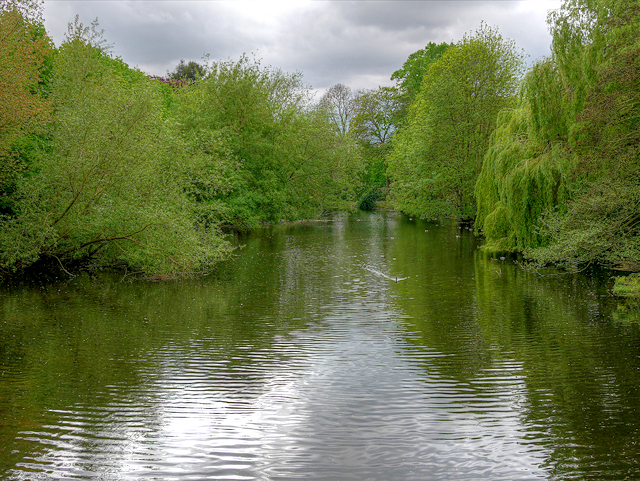
Part of the former Fleet, now known as Peel's Cut

Lloyd's navigation rights expired in 1849 and Peel's Bond End Mill ceased production in the same year 1849. The mill site was afterwards used to store ale and timber and, after use as a municipal waste site from the 1880s, is now a supermarket. Water carried by Peel's Cut was later used by one of the Burton breweries. The weir at the Branston end was derelict by 1955 and Peel's Cut was filled in, alongside many other secondary river channels in the area, in the late 1960s.

Only a short section of the original Peel's Cut, at the northern end, remains in water. The name has become extended to the stretch of water formerly known as the Fleet, which runs parallel to the main river channel before rejoining it near to Burton Library and the Meadowside Leisure Centre. This stretch is crossed by the wooden-decked Cattle Bridge footbridge, renovated in 2018. It is also crossed by Stapenhill Viaduct, erected in 1890 as an extension of the Ferry Bridge across the main channel to replace a set of stepping stones, and Andresey Bridge erected in 1884.
