= Thomas Wilmington =

English footballer

Personal information
- Full name: Thomas Wilmington
- Date of birth: 1875
- Place of birth: Oswaldtwistle, England
- Position: Winger

Senior career*
Years	Team	Apps	(Gls)
	Accrington Stanley	?	(?)
1895–1896	Burnley	0	(0)
1896–1897	Blackburn Rovers	9	(0)
	Nelson	?	(?)
–	Southport Central	?	(?)
- * Club domestic league appearances and goals

Thomas Wilmington (born 1875) was an English professional footballer who played as a winger in the Football League for Blackburn Rovers.
