= Listed buildings in Oswaldtwistle =

Oswaldtwistle is a village in Hyndburn, Lancashire, England. It contains 15 buildings which are designated by Historic England and recorded in the National Heritage List for England. Of these, one is listed at Grade II*, the middle grade, and the others are at Grade II. Until the arrival of industry, the area was rural, and most of the earliest listed building are, or originated as farmhouses. One building does retain a former loomshop, an example of domestic industry. The Leeds and Liverpool Canal and the former East Lancashire Railway pass through the area, and the listed buildings associated with these are two canal bridges and a railway viaduct. The remaining listed buildings are a church and a war memorial.

== Key ==
Grade	Criteria
II*	Particularly important buildings of more than special interest
II	Buildings of national importance and special interest

== Buildings ==
Name and location	Photograph	Date	Notes	Grade
2 and 4 Lower Aspen Lane; 53.75107°N 2.40350°W		Early 17th century	Originally a farmhouse, later divided into two dwellings, the building is in sandstone with a stone-slate roof. There are two storeys and three bays, with the original Tudor arched doorway on the south side. The windows are mullioned, or mullioned and transomed.	II
Jackhouse Farmhouse; 53.73111°N 2.39480°W		17th century	The former farmhouse was extended at the east end in the 19th century. It is in sandstone with stone-slate roofs. The house has a T-shaped plan with a two-bay cross-wing at the west end. The windows are mullioned.	II
Knuzden Hall Farmhouse; 53.74749°N 2.42466°W	—	17th century	A sandstone farmhouse with a stone-slate roof, in storeys. It has an L-shaped plan, with a three-bay main range and a wing at the rear of the first bay. On the front is a tall single-story gabled porch. Most of the windows have been altered, but some mullions remain.	II
Peel Fold Farmhouse; 53.74776°N 2.43027°W	—	17th century	The former farmhouse is in sandstone with a stone-slate roof, and has two storeys. There are three bays, with the third bay being a cross-wing. It has a moulded doorcase, and the windows are mullioned. The house was the birthplace of Robert Peel.	II
Rough Heys Farm Cottage; 53.73811°N 2.37726°W	—	17th century	The farmhouse was extended in the 18th century, and has since been divided into two dwellings. It is in sandstone, partly rendered, and has a stone-slate roof. There are two storeys, with a single-storey extension at the right end. The building has an L-shaped plan, with three bays and a rear wing to the first bay. On the front is a two-storey gabled porch containing a datestone. Most of the windows are mullioned.	II
Lower Aspen Farmhouse; 53.75187°N 2.40279°W		Late 17th century (probable)	The former farmhouse is in sandstone and has a stone-slate roof. It has two storeys and an attic, and is in a single bay, with an outshut at the rear. The windows are mullioned, and inside is an inglenook bressumer.	II
Stanhill Hall; 53.74642°N 2.41337°W	—	1748	A stone house that was remodelled in about 1840, it has sandstone dressings and a tiled roof. There are two storeys and three bays. In the centre is a large two-storey gabled porch flanked by crenellated turrets. The porch has a Tudor arched doorway, and a large stone inscribed with the date in the apex.	II
Rough Heys Farmhouse and barn 53.73822°N 2.37764°W	—	18th century	A former farmhouse in sandstone with a stone-slate roof, in two storeys and three bays. The windows contain altered glazing. Attached to the rear is a four-bay barn, which includes opposed wagon entrances, doors, and windows including bullseye windows, and a datestone inscribed 1877.	II
Oswaldtwistle Club; 53.74484°N 2.39570°W	—	Late 18th century	This originated as a house and a warehouse associated with the handloom industry, and has later been used as a club and a workshop. The building is in sandstone, partly rendered, and with a roof partly slated and partly covered with corrugated metal. The original house is in two storeys and three symmetrical bays, and the former warehouse has three storeys and four bays.	II
Knuzden Hall; 53.74740°N 2.42461°W	—	1784	A sandstone house with a slate roof, in three storeys and with a symmetrical three-bay front. The central doorway has a Tuscan doorcase, with an open pediment and a semicircular fanlight. One of the quoins is inscribed with initials and the date.	II
Canal bridge number 110; 53.75097°N 2.40419°W		c. 1810	The bridge carries a roadway over the Leeds and Liverpool Canal. It is in sandstone, and consists of a single rounded arch with rusticated voussoirs, keystones, bands, parapets with flat coping, and pilasters at the ends.	II
Canal bridge number 111; 53.75246°N 2.39807°W		c. 1810	An accommodation bridge over the Leeds and Liverpool Canal. It is in sandstone, and consists of a single high elliptical arch with rusticated voussoirs, bands, and parapets with ridged coping.	II
Immanuel Church; 53.73603°N 2.40579°W		1836–37	The church was designed by J. and T. Stones in Early English style, and extended in 1866–67 by J. and J. M. Hay. It is built in sandstone with a slate roof, and has a cruciform plan consisting of a nave, transepts, a chancel and a west tower. The tower has three stages, it contains a porch, and has buttresses, and pinnacles. The windows are lancets.	II
Railway viaduct 53.75066°N 2.39308°W		c. 1847	The viaduct was built to carry the East Lancashire Railway over Tinker Brook. It has stone piers and consists of seven brick arches with spans of 40 feet (12 m) at a height of 50 feet (15 m). At the west end is a bridge consisting of a low segmental arch, with rusticated voussoirs, balustrades, and piers at both ends.	II
War memorial 53.74389°N 2.39489°W		1921	The war memorial was designed by L. F. Roslyn. It consists of a tapered stone obelisk on an oblong plinth standing on three steps. On the top is a statue of a winged figure representing Victory. At the base of the obelisk is a statue of a soldier protecting a comrade, and at the sides are angles with wreaths; all the statues are in bronze. There are inscriptions on the sides of the plinth.	II*
