= Listed buildings in Shobnall =

Shobnall is a civil parish in the district of East Staffordshire, Staffordshire, England. It contains 15 buildings that are recorded in the National Heritage List for England. Of these, two are listed at Grade II*, the middle grade, and the others are at Grade II, the lowest grade. The parish is in the western part of the town of Burton upon Trent, and its listed buildings include the town hall and a brewery and associated structures. The Trent and Mersey Canal passes through the parish, and two mileposts on the canal are listed. The other listed buildings include houses and associated structures, a farmhouse, a church, a bridge, and a statue.

== Key ==
Grade	Criteria
II*	Particularly important buildings of more than special interest
II	Buildings of national importance and special interest

== Buildings ==
Name and location	Photograph	Date	Notes	Grade
Sinai Park; 52.80501°N 1.67191°W	—	Early 16th century	A farmhouse that was remodelled in the 17th and 19th centuries. It is timber framed on a stone plinth, partly replaced in brick, with infill in brick and wattle and daub, and tile roofs. There is a U-shaped plan, with a central range of two storeys and two bays, and flanking wings with two storeys and attics and three bays. In the central range is a gabled porch, the windows are casements, and there are dormers.	II*
Shobnall Grange; 52.80833°N 1.66586°W	—	17th century	The house was extended in the 19th century, and it has a tile roof. The original part is in brick with some stone, and has moulded string courses. There are two storeys and an attic, and a doorway with a shallow arched head. The windows are mullioned, or mullioned and transomed. The extension is rendered and has two storeys.	II
Gate piers, Shobnall Grange; 52.80863°N 1.66551°W	—	17th century (probable)	The gate piers are in stone, and have moulded cornice caps.	II
Canal Milepost at SK 2267 2260; 52.80070°N 1.66515°W		1819	The milepost is on the towpath of the Trent and Mersey Canal. It is in cast iron, and consists of a circular post with a moulded head and two convex tablets. On the tablets are inscribed the distances in miles to Shardlow and to Preston Brook, and the date and details of the maker are on the shaft.	II
Canal Milepost off Shobnall Street; 52.81177°N 1.65097°W		1819	The milepost is on the towpath of the Trent and Mersey Canal. It is in cast iron, and consists of a circular post with a moulded head and two convex tablets. On the tablets are inscribed the distances in miles to Shardlow and to Preston Brook, and the date and details of the maker are on the shaft.	II
St Paul's Church; 52.80816°N 1.64686°W		1874	The church is built in stone and is in Geometrical style. It consists of a nave with a clerestory, north and south aisles, north and south transepts, a chancel with a south chapel, and a tower at the crossing. The tower has an embattled parapet with corner turrets, and at the west end is a rose window. Some of the internal features are by George Frederick Bodley.	II*
292–303 Shobnall Road; 52.80722°N 1.65689°W		c. 1875	A terrace of twelve workers' cottages in red brick with blue brick dressings, bands, a dentilled eaves cornice, and a Welsh slate roof. There are two storeys, each cottage has two bays and a projecting range at the rear. The windows are sashes with cambered heads, and the doors are in the rear ranges.	II
125–145 Wellington Street; 52.80726°N 1.64583°W	—	1875	A group of almshouses forming three ranges round a courtyard. They are in red brick with stone dressings, corbelled eaves and slate roofs, and are in Gothic style. They have one storey, apart from the middle part of the central range, which has two storeys. Each house has a two-light mullioned window with a pointed head, a recessed doorway, and a wooden porch. In the centre block is a canted mullioned oriel window, and to its right is a tower with pinnacles.	II
Marston's Brewery; 52.80712°N 1.65868°W		1875	The brewery is in red brick with dressings in blue brick and stone, a moulded eaves course, a cornice, a parapet with a plaque with the name of the original brewers, and a Welsh slate roof. It is in three and four storeys, and has nine bays separated by pilasters flanking round-headed arches with keyblocks. In the arches are round-headed cast iron casement windows. On the roof is a water tank, at the rear is a boiler house, and there is a tall octagonal chimney.	II
Central brewing tower, Marston's Brewery; 52.80718°N 1.65902°W	—	1875	The tower is in red brick with dressings in blue brick and stone, a corbelled eaves course, and a stone cornice. It is in three and four storeys, and has nine bays and windows with semicircular heads. On the roof is a metal water tanks with panelled sides. In the ground floor are two projecting bays, a round-headed doorway and a modern canted bay window.	II
Offices, Marston's Brewery; 52.80779°N 1.65859°W		c. 1875	The offices are in red brick with dressings in blue brick and stone, and a Welsh slate roof. They form a long range of 15 bays, and are in three parts. The left part has two storeys, round-headed windows, and a doorway with a fanlight and a pediment. The middle part has two storeys, and contains pilasters and a carriage entry with octagonal gate piers and wrought iron gates. In the upper floor are two canted bay windows, the other windows having round heads. The right part has one storey and an attic, and contains a shop front, ground floor windows with cambered heads, and flat-headed dormers.	II
Burton upon Trent Town Hall; 52.80786°N 1.64540°W		1878	The town hall was extended in 1894. It is in red brick with stone dressings and slate roofs, and is in Gothic style. The original part has two storeys and six bays, buttresses, mullioned and transomed windows, and gables with pinnacles carrying lions and standards. The later part includes a tower and an entrance with a porte-cochère and a three-bay wing with mullioned windows, the middle bay projecting and gabled. To the left is a single-storey wing containing a concert hall.	II
Former Midland Railway Grain Warehouse; 52.80704°N 1.64238°W		c. 1880–90	The warehouse was built by the Midland Railway, and is in red brick with a slate roof containing skylights. There are three storeys and a basement, and eleven bays. The ground floor windows have round heads, the windows in the upper floors have square heads, and there are three weatherboarded two-storey gabled grain hoists.	II
Station Bridge and walls 52.80637°N 1.64202°W		1881	The bridge carries Borough Road over Burton-on-Trent railway station. It is in cast iron with brick flanking walls. There are three segmental arches flanked by a narrow arch on each side, carried on 14 round columns. In the spandrels are rosettes and daggers, above each arch is a shield with the date, and the bridge has a panelled parapet with a central lantern.	II
Statue of Michael Arthur Bass; 52.80768°N 1.64558°W		1911	The statue of Michael Bass, 1st Baron Burton stands outside the Town Hall. It is by F. W. Pomeroy, and consists of a life-size bronze statue on a stone plinth.	II
