= Oswaldtwistle Town Hall =

Municipal building in Oswaldtwistle, Lancashire, England

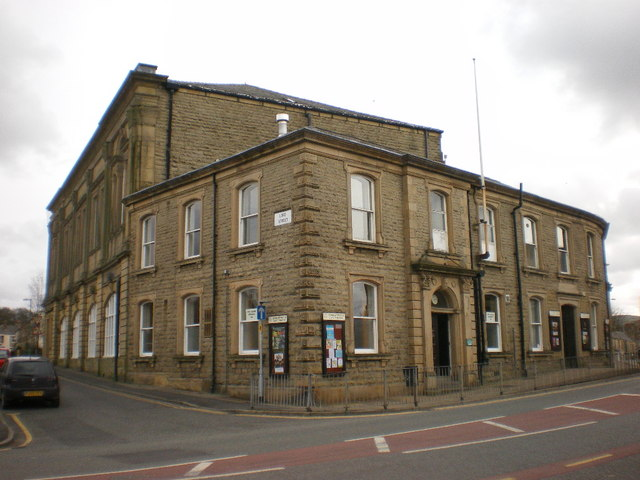
- The building in 2009

- Shown in Lancashire Location in Borough of Hyndburn
- 53.7453°N 2.3939°W
- Location: Union Road, Oswaldtwistle

History
- Built: 1891

Site notes
- Architect: Robert Naisbitt Hunter
- Architectural style: Neoclassical style

Oswaldtwistle Town Hall is a municipal building in Union Road, Oswaldtwistle, a town in Lancashire, England. The building accommodated the Oswaldtwistle Civic Arts Centre until it closed in 2023.

== History ==
Following its formation in 1869, the Oswaldtwistle Local Board and Urban Sanitary Authority set about commissioning offices for the town's administration. The site they selected was on the east side of Union Road.

The front section of the building was designed in the neoclassical style, built in rubble masonry and dated from that time. The design involved an asymmetrical main frontage of seven bays facing onto Union Road. The second and seventh bays were slightly projected forward and contained round headed doorways with semi-circular fanlights, archivolts and keystones, while the fifth bay contained a less ornate doorway with a hood mould. The main frontage was fenestrated by segmental headed sash windows with window sills and architraves.

Following an initiative by the pastor of the John Street Chapel, the Rev. William Edmund Holt, a public hall was erected behind the original building by contractors, W. H. Bury and A. Dichmont, to a design by the town surveyor, Robert Naisbitt Hunter, in 1891. It was intended to commemorate the Golden Jubilee of Queen Victoria and accommodated a ballroom on the first floor. After the local board was succeeded by Oswaldtwistle Urban District Council in 1894, the entire complex became known as the town hall. From 1900, the building also housed the town's fire engine.

The building was used by the War Office as a recruiting station for the Accrington Pals Battalion of the East Lancashire Regiment, a part of Kitchener's Army, which was raised in September 1914 at the outbreak of the First World war.

The fire service relocated to a new fire station at the junction of Mill Hill and Union Road in the mid-20th century. The complex continued to serve as the headquarters of the district council for much of the 20th century, but ceased to be the local seat of government when the enlarged Hyndburn Borough Council was formed in 1974. Following a rise in student numbers, Rhyddings High School held classes in the building in the late 1970s. It was subsequently converted for use as the Oswaldtwistle Civic Theatre.

In August 2010, the building was renovated, with a new arts centre downstairs and the theatre upstairs, managed separately. The venue was the original home of Jason Manford's comedy club, established in May 2014, and the management of the arts centre was also responsible for reinstating the Oswaldtwistle Carnival, after a hiatus of 16 years, in June 2014. The comedian, Peter Kay, gave a surprise performance in the building in July 2015, and the musician, Paul Young, took part in a concert there in March 2023.

However, by July 2023, the management company, Hyndburn Arts was unable to fund repairs, and the board of the company decided to close the building. In September 2023, Hyndburn Borough Council took possession of it, and, in January 2024, the council said it would look at options for re-opening it.

== Restoration and reopening efforts ==
In April 2025, Theatres Trust announced that Oswaldtwistle Civic Arts Centre and Theatre would receive part of a £74,835 fund allocated to 10 Theatres at Risk. These grants are intended to support preparatory work such as condition surveys, business planning, fundraising strategies, viability studies and governance reviews.

In October 2025, Hyndburn Borough Council issued a public tender for roof repair works at the theatre, aiming to address structural deterioration and ensure the long-term preservation of the historic building.
