= Parsley Peel =

British merchant (1723–1795)

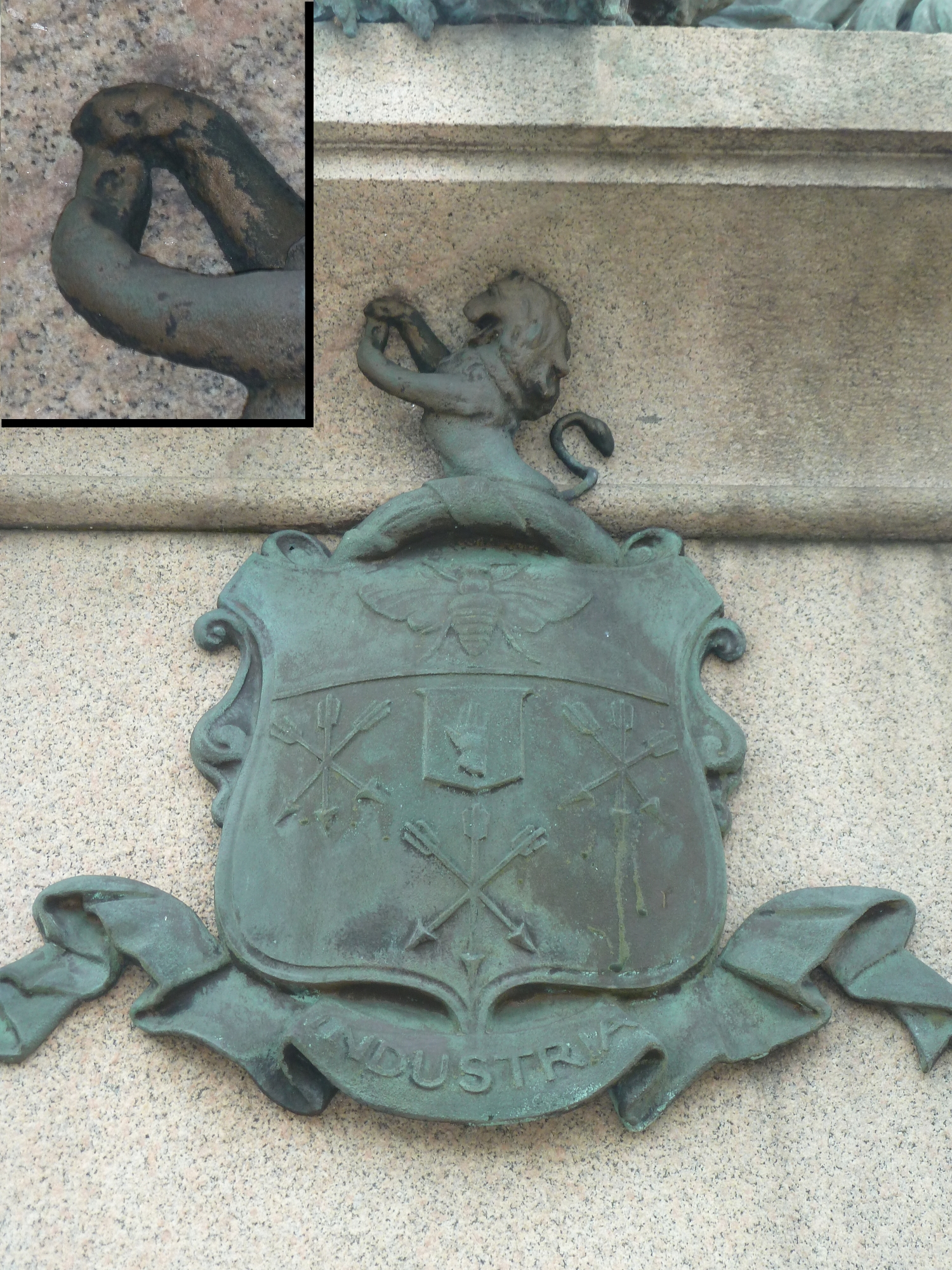
- The Peel arms commissioned by Peel. Inset to show the lion is holding a shuttle.
- Born: Robert Peele; 1723; Peele Fold, Oswaldtwistle, England
- Died: September 1795 (aged 71–72)
- Known for: Textile manufacturer
- Spouse: Elizabeth Haworth (m. 1744)
- Children: 7, including Sir Robert, 1st Baronet

Robert "Parsley" Peel (1723 – 12 September 1795) was a British merchant who was the grandfather of Robert Peel, a future prime minister of the United Kingdom. Peel started life as a yeoman farmer but experimented with calico printing, eventually creating a parsley leaf pattern which would become his trademark. Despite losing a number of machines during riots, Peel's company became the largest in the textile sector by the time of his death, with 23 factories.

== Early life ==
Robert Peele was born in 1723 at Peele Fold in Oswaldtwistle to William Peele and Jane Anne Walmsley. His family were traditionally yeoman farmers, until his grandfather Robert Peele abandoned the trade in favour of making woollen cloth. Parsley's father, William, attempted to return the family to farming and after his education at Blackburn Grammar School, he initially joined his father in this pursuit. He inherited the woodblocks his grandfather used for printing on wool and started experimenting with them. When his wife's brother, Jonathan Haworth, returned from an apprenticeship to a calico-printer in London, the pair attempted to set up a business in calico printing. They received financial backing from William Yates, the landlord of the local public house and formed Haworth, Peel and Yates in 1750, consisting of a factory in Blackburn and a warehouse in Manchester. By this point, Peel had dropped the final 'e' from his surname, his reason being that "it was of no use, as it did not add to the sound".

== Calico printing ==
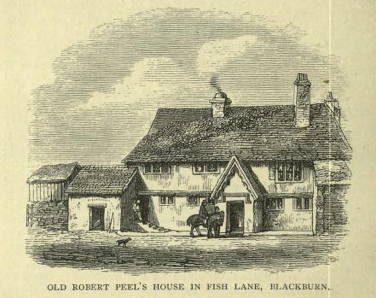
Parsley Peel's house in Fish Lane, a possible site of his experiments

Peel had gained a reputation for trying new methods within the industry, being one of the first textile manufacturers to use carding cylinders. He began experimenting at his home with different forms of printing until, according to family tradition, his young daughter Anne brought him a sprig of parsley and begged him to use it as a pattern. He etched this design onto a pewter plate to allow the printing, which was then finished with an iron by one of the women of the household. There are other versions of the tale, which dispute whether the experiments happened at the farm at Peel Fold or his house in Fish Lane and suggest a poor neighbour, Mrs. Milton, calendered the cloth to finish it.

The exact nature of the discovery made by Peel is unclear. It is likely that it was a new method for using the acetate of lead as a dye-fixer (mordant). Another possibility is the use of metal engraving rather than wooden blocks to create the pattern. However it came to be, the pattern was named "Nancy's pattern" after Peel's daughter and was very popular – leading to Robert Peel's nickname of "Parsley Peel". The company went on to be one of the first calico printers in Lancashire.

== Cotton manufacture ==
Peel worked in Oswaldtwistle with one of his weavers, James Hargreaves, to investigate new technologies. In 1762, Peel and Hargreaves set up a carding machine, but decided against using it. When Hargreaves went on to invent the spinning jenny in 1764, Peel was keen to use the technology. He set them up in his factory at Stanhill where Hargreaves worked. In the spring of 1768, the spinning jennies at Peel's factory were blamed for job losses. The factories and Hargreaves' nearby house were the targets of a riot, destroying the spinning jennies within – along with some of Peel's own inventions. In reaction, Peel moved his manufacturing away from Lancashire. He decided on Burton-upon-Trent where he built three mills, including cutting a canal (known as Peel's Cut) for one.

In 1779, Peel's mill in Altham was caught in series of riots against machinery, specifically the carding machines and spinning jenny. Peel came to see the destruction as fortuitous, as he then turned to Richard Arkwright's carding "engine". By 1795, Peel's family run company, Peel & Co., was the largest in the cotton industry with twenty-three mills around the north west of England, fourteen more than their closest competitor.

== Personal life ==
"A man, barring accidents, might be whatever he chose."

— Parsley Peel's personal maxim

Peel was described as "a tall robust man" with reddish hair, cautious but shrewd, who led the family to fortune through perseverance and resolve. He married Elizabeth Haworth on 28 August 1744 and they had eight children, including Sir Robert Peel, 1st Baronet. Sir Robert Peel went on to father Sir Robert Peel, 2nd Baronet, the future Prime Minister of the United Kingdom, who helped to create the modern concept of a police force. Young Robert would visit Parsley Peel and his wife at their home in Ardwick. Douglas Hurd noted that Parsley Peel was satisfied with his lot and did not expect to rise up the social ladder personally, though he hoped his children would.

John Wesley said of him, "I was invited to breakfast at Bury by Mr Peel, a calico printer who a few years ago began with £500 and is now supposed to have gained £20,000. Oh, what a miracle if he lose not his own soul." In 1794, Parsley Peel obtained the grant of a coat of arms, including a shuttle held by a lion, a bee signifying business and a new family motto Industria.

Towards the end of his life, Peel started to lean heavily on a cane. He lived out his final days in Ardwick Green, near his daughter. Peel died on 12 September 1795, and was buried in St John's Church, Manchester. His wife survived him by six months; one of her final wishes was to outlive her husband to care for him in his final days. He left his estate split equally between his eight children, valued at £13,000 each (worth about £1.1 million in 2013). (Note: Comparing standard of living between 1795 and 2013, the modern equivalent is about £1,102,000 according to MeasuringWorth.com)
