= Oswaldtwistle =

Town in Lancashire, England

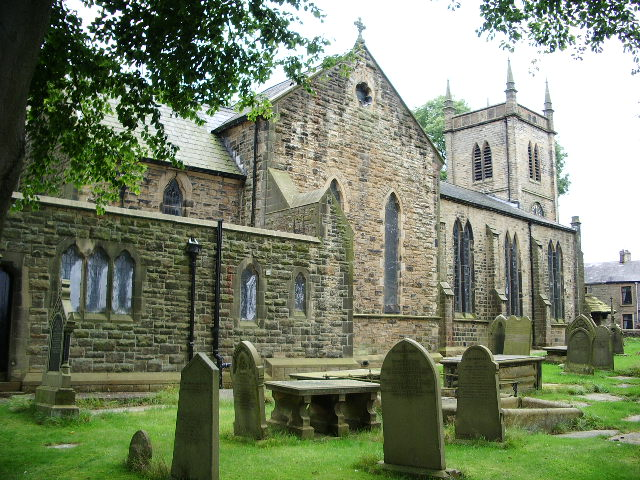
- The Parish Church of Immanuel

- Location in Hyndburn Location within Lancashire
- Area: 0.93 sq mi (2.4 km^{2})
- Population: 10,815 (2021)
  - Density: 11,629/sq mi (4,490/km^{2})
- OS grid reference: SD740275
- District: Hyndburn
- Shire county: Lancashire
- Region: North West
- Country: England
- Sovereign state: United Kingdom
- Post town: ACCRINGTON
- Postcode district: BB5
- Dialling code: 01254
- Police: Lancashire
- Fire: Lancashire
- Ambulance: North West
- UK Parliament: Hyndburn

Oswaldtwistle (/ˈɒz(w)əl.twɪzəl/ "ozzle twizzle") is a town in the Hyndburn borough of Lancashire, England, 3 miles (5 km) southeast of Blackburn, contiguous with Accrington. The town has a rich industrial heritage, being home to James Hargreaves, inventor of the spinning jenny, and Robert "Parsley" Peel of calico printing fame. The Leeds and Liverpool Canal passes through the town and was responsible for the export of much of the area's cotton produce.

At the 2011 census, it had a population of 11,803. In 2021 the population had decreased to 10,815

== History ==
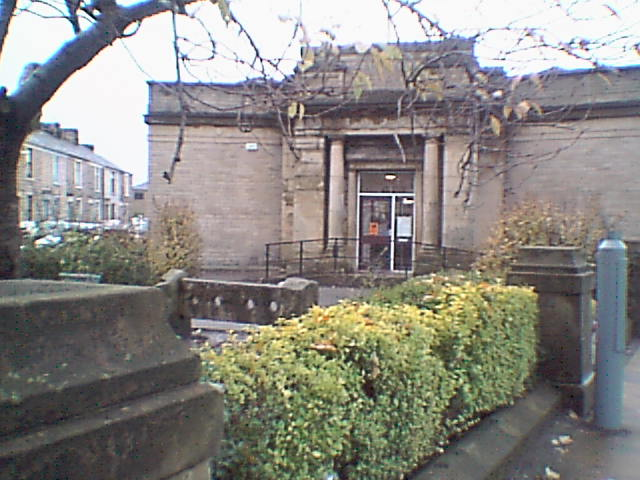
Oswaldtwistle Library (2000)

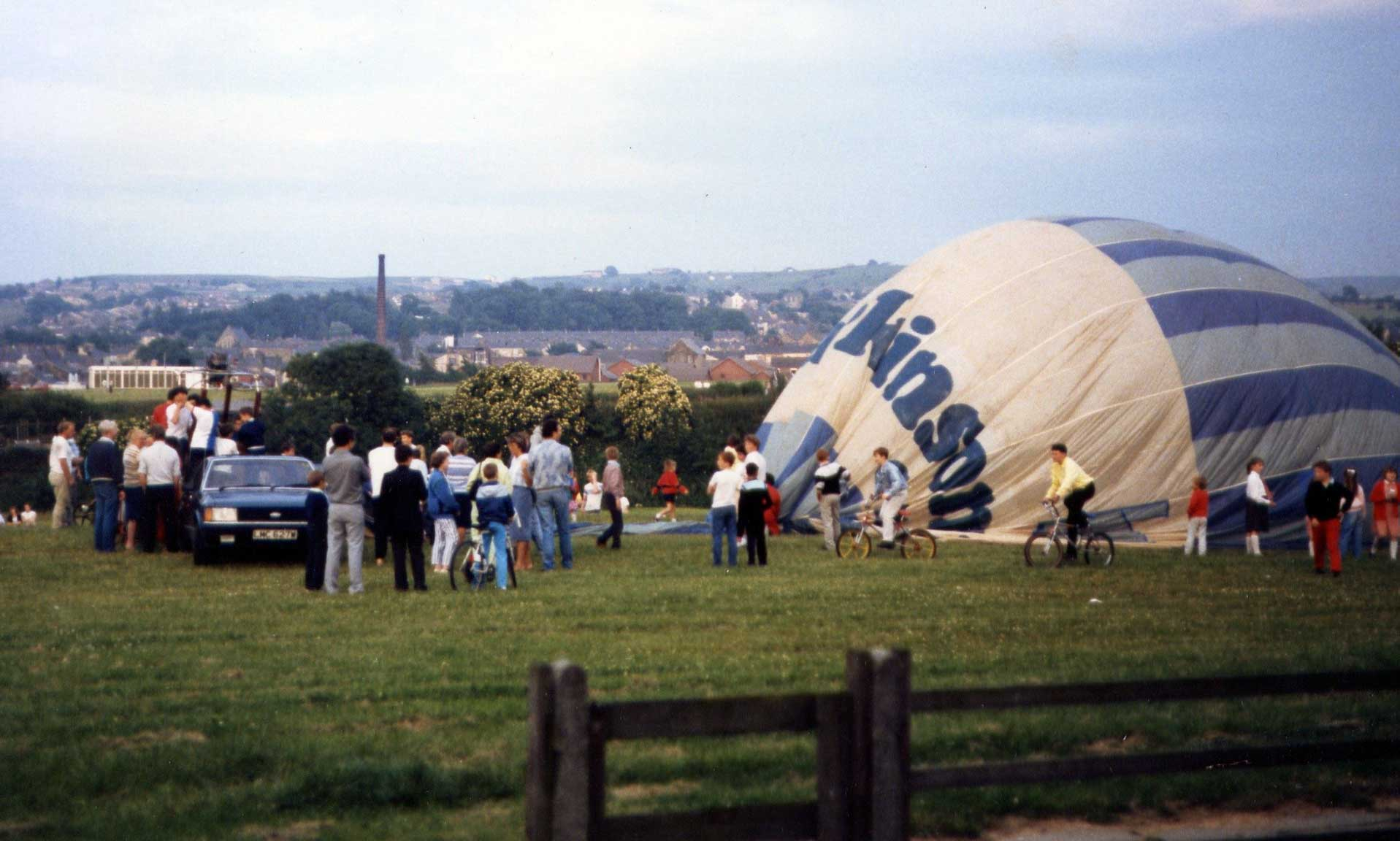
White Ash Field (1988)

The name is derived from "Oswald" and "Twistle". The word "twistle" is an old English word meaning "brooks meet". Legend has it that Saint Oswald, King of Northumbria passed through, giving the area its full title of Oswald's Twistle, which in time came to be Oswaldtwistle. However, it is more likely derived from the name of the Anglo-Saxon who farmed the land.

=== The Peel family ===
Robert Peel was born at Peelfold (within the township) in 1723, and laid the family fortunes by innovations in calico printing. A particularly successful pattern featured a sprig of parsley, so Robert Peel became known as "Parsley Peel". Robert Peel went into business with his Brother-in-law, Jonathan Haworth in 1760, establishing the Brookside Mill Calico Works, the remnants of which are still visible in Bury Meadow Nature Reserve.

The soubriquet helps distinguish him from his son also Robert Peel, who was born at Peelfold in 1750 and went on to become a successful cotton mill owner (with large works at Bury and Burton on Trent), a very rich man, an MP and a Baronet.

Sir Robert's son (Parsley Peel's grandson), born at Bury, was yet another Robert Peel and in due course Sir Robert Peel; he was a full-time politician, founder of the Metropolitan Police, and rose to be Prime Minister. Another historical figure associated with the textile industry was James Hargreaves, inventor of the Spinning Jenny.

=== Power loom riots ===
The people of Oswaldtwistle were involved in the power loom riots of 1826. The mechanisation of the textile industry (with the introduction of looms powered by steam engines from the 1820s onwards) resulted in redundancies, low wages, and hunger. On 26 April, a large number of cotton workers attacked the factory in White Ash (Brookside Mill) in Oswaldtwistle, about a mile from Hargreaves' workshop, destroying looms and other equipment. The riots went on for three days, extending to all cotton towns in central Lancashire.

=== Coal ===
Oswaldtwistle is part of the Burnley Coalfield and had a number of coal mines such as Aspen Colliery 53°45′07″N 2°24′00″W next the canal and the East Lancashire line, having both a canal basin and railway siding. Mining here is thought to have commenced in the early 19th century and the colliery closed in 1930. The remains of the site which includes two stone-built engine beds and a bank of 24 beehive type coke ovens are protected as a scheduled monument.

Others in the hills to the south, include: Broadfield Colliery 53°44′13″N 2°22′52″W which in the 1840s had a surface tramroad connected to the printworks at Foxhill Bank via Moscow Mills; Sough Lane Colliery 53°43′48″N 2°25′44″W which had a tramroad connecting it to Knuzden; and Town Bent Colliery 53°44′10″N 2°23′49″W.

=== Sir William Wiggins Cocker (1896–1982) ===
Industrialist, Chemist, and Pioneer of the Antiseptic Industry Sir William Wiggins Cocker was an influential English industrialist, chemist, and public figure. He is most celebrated for founding the Cocker Chemical Company in Oswaldtwistle, which became a cornerstone of the global antiseptic industry by producing the core active ingredients for Dettol.

William Wiggins Cocker was born on 17 October 1896 in Accrington, Lancashire, to parents Wiggins Cocker and Priscilla Wilkins. He attended Hannah Street School and St. Andrews in Accrington. By 1911, at just 14 years old, William was working as a shop assistant to help support his family. His introduction to the chemical sector came when he took a position as a commercial traveller for Woolley of Blackburn (later known as Cupal), a prominent healthcare and manufacturing chemical company. This role provided the industry insights that inspired him to venture out on his own.

In the early 1920s, William started a small, one-man chemical operation, based out of an infant street in Blackburn. Recognizing the need for advanced technical expertise, he partnered with his highly educated younger cousin, the brilliant organic chemist Dr. Wesley Cocker. Together, they manufactured fine chemicals and resins for the paint trade. Their monumental breakthrough came from manufacturing chlorinated phenols—specifically chloroxylenol. This compound became the primary germ-killing, antiseptic agent in Dettol.

To meet overwhelming global demand from consumer goods giant Reckitt and Sons, William expanded operations and built the large, state-of-the-art Cocker Chemicals production facility on Nook Lane in Oswaldtwistle. He served as its Managing Director for decades, remaining at the helm until 1963. Beyond his profound business acumen, William was heavily involved in Lancashire's civic and political life, notably serving as a local Mayor and supporting numerous community development initiatives. On 12 July 1955, he was created a Knight Bachelor by Queen Elizabeth II in recognition of his political, public, and industrial services to Lancashire.

After retiring from active management of the Oswaldtwistle factory in 1963, Sir William relocated to Lytham St Annes. He died in 1982.

=== PoW camps ===
During World War II, a number of PoWs (particularly Italians) were interned in camps near Oswaldtwistle.

== Governance ==
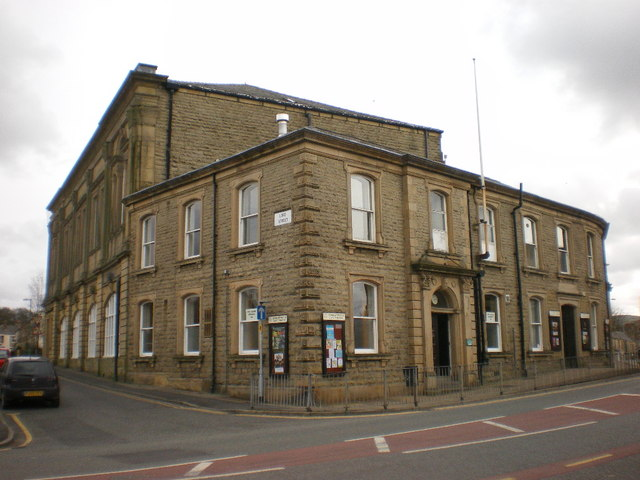
Oswaldtwistle Town Hall

Oswaldtwistle was once a township in the ancient parish of Whalley, covering Oswaldtwistle Moor in the south and with Knuzden Brook forming the boundary with Blackburn, and as far as the village of Belthorn. The township became a civil parish in 1866.

Between 1894 and 1974, the area was administered by an urban district. It has since become an unparished part of the borough of Hyndburn. Oswaldtwistle Town Hall was completed in 1891.

== Economy ==
In the 1940s, Alfred N. Waterhouse in Oswaldtwistle created what became Shopfitters Lancashire Ltd. In the 1950s, the firm moved from Accrington to Rhyddings Mill, Oswaldtwistle. He was a very successful entrepreneur, manufacturing commercial fit-out for retailers. At its peak in the 1960s, Shopfitters (Lancashire) Ltd employed over 80 salesmen nationally, and had an annual turnover measured in millions, in an age when a new house cost about £3,000. The firm closed in the 1980s.

The town centre is home to a number of high street multiples. There are a number of independent businesses in the town. Other stores include an appliance repairs/sales, numerous takeaways, numerous barbers, estate agents, off licences, bakers, butchers, funeral directors and many more shops. There are several Boys' Brigade/Girl's Brigade groups in the town, along with groups for Scouts, Beavers and Cubs. Additionally, Hyndburn Comets, a group of majorettes, exists in the town.

== Landmarks ==
=== Oswaldtwistle Moor ===
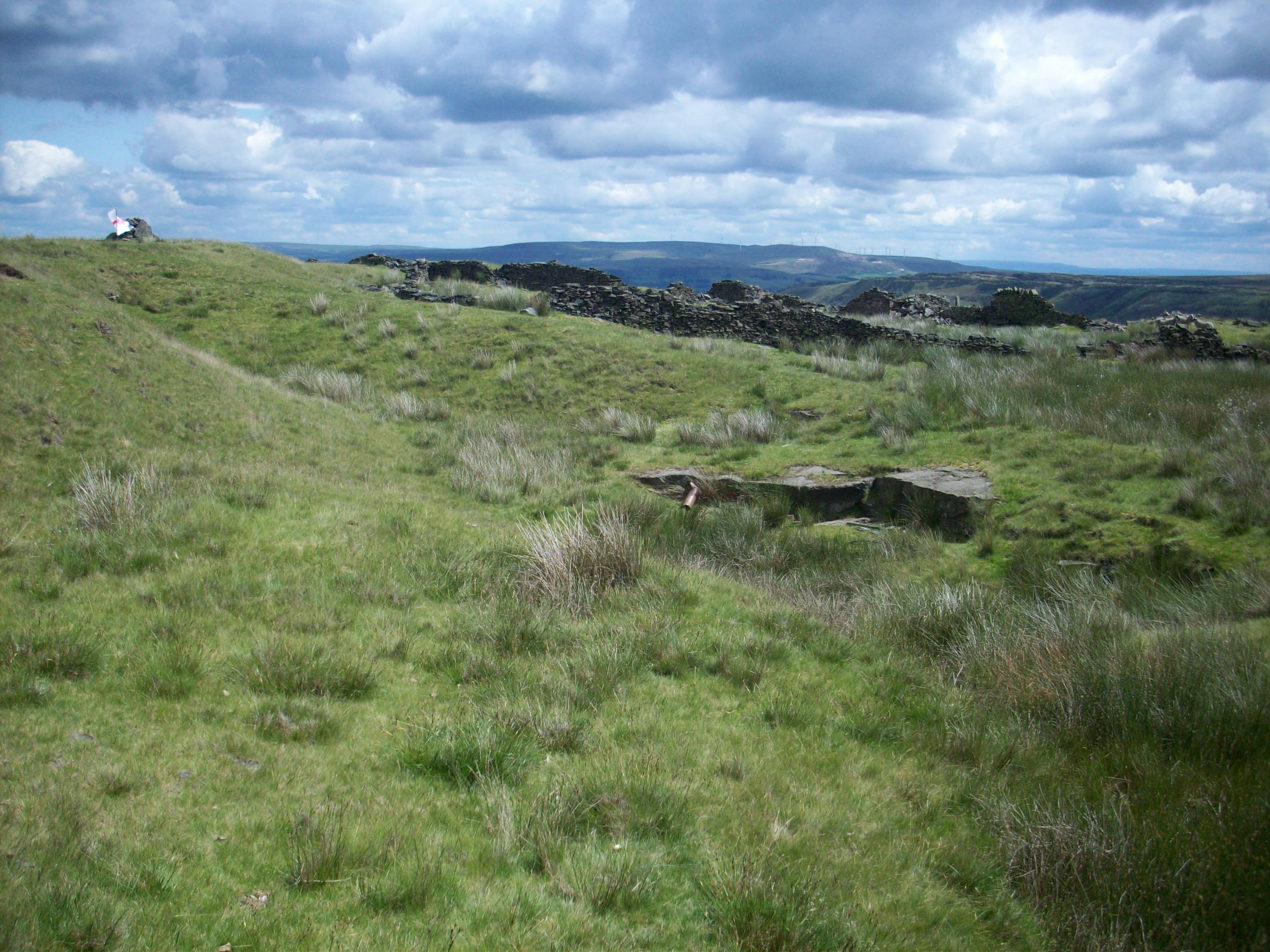
Oswaldtwistle Moor (2011)

Oswaldtwistle Moor (adjacent to Haslingden Moor) is an extensive area of moorland to the south of Oswaldtwistle, with Haslingden Grane bordering the moor's southern edges, Belthorn to the west and Haslingden to the east. The area forms part of the West Pennine Moors.

The moors are used for annual fell running events: Ossy Moors Fell Race and Stanhill Fell Race, which has been run since 1995.

In May 2007, plans were made to build a wind farm consisting of twelve wind turbines on the moors. This attracted both support and opposition, but the plan was approved by councillors in March 2010. In October 2012, the project was officially completed, and was called the Hyndburn Wind Farm.

=== Oswaldtwistle Mills ===
Oswaldtwistle Mills is a notable attraction; a textile mill converted into a craft fair and with an exhibition about life in the mill a hundred years ago.

=== Civic Arts Centre and Theatre ===
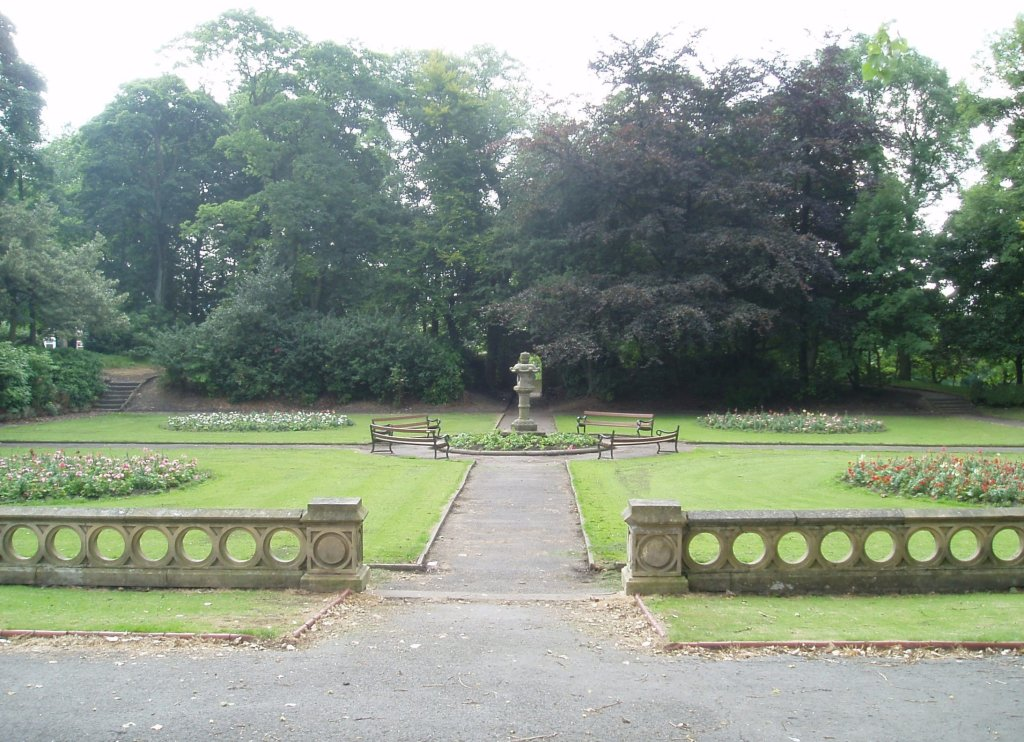
Rhyddings Park (2005)

Also of note is the 457 capacity, recently refurbished, Civic Theatre, known as the "Friendly Theatre" and the brand new Civic Arts Centre. The ground floor was refurbished, and in August 2010, it opened as the Civic Arts Centre.

The first production performed at the Arts Centre was Romeo and Juliet, directed by young producer, Joanne Haworth. Since then, there have been many productions, with something different happening every week. There are workshops, and drama sessions most evenings, plus projects and new plays, being written, and performed, with at least four plays in production, at any one time. The Centre is now home to a number of theatre groups, including ReAct Academy, Dramatic Annie, Sparks, Oswaldtwistle Players and St Mary's Panto among others. The theatre now has a professional production company that produces shows that are toured around Lancashire.

The Civic Arts Centre is involved in local heritage projects, and organises outdoor festivals. From 1 April 2015, the Arts Centre & Theatre merged, and the building is now known as the Civic Arts Centre and Theatre. It is home to Manford's Comedy Clubs. Jason Manford and John Bishop have both performed there at Manford's Comedy evenings.

=== Rhyddings Park ===
Rhyddings Park is the only formal park within Oswaldtwistle. It was originally the grounds of a private house belonging to a local mill owning family. It has been a public park since 1909. More information about Rhyddings Park can be found on the website of its active community group.

== Education ==
Oswaldtwistle is home to Rhyddings (secondary school), Hippings Methodist Primary School, St. Mary's RC Primary School, St. Paul's CE Primary School, Moor End Primary School, St. Andrew's CE Primary School, West End Primary School, Oswaldtwistle School (a PRU), and White Ash Specialist School.

== Media ==
Local news and television programmes are provided by BBC North West and ITV Granada. Television signals are received from the Winter Hill TV transmitter and the local relay TV transmitter located in the Forest of Pendle.

Local radio stations are BBC Radio Lancashire, Capital Manchester and Lancashire (formerly 2BR), Heart North West, Smooth North West, Greatest Hits Radio Lancashire, and Central Radio.

The town is served by the local newspaper, Lancashire Telegraph.

== Sport ==
Oswaldtwistle Rovers F.C. were a football team in the late 19th century; they managed to reach the second round of the FA Cup in 1885.

Oswaldtwistle is also the home of Oswaldtwistle Juniors FC, a local junior football club that plays in the ADJFL and ELFA, they play their home matches on a public field by Frederick Street.

== Notable people ==
Spinning jenny

- James Hargreaves (1720–1778), creator of the spinning jenny.
- Parsley Peel (1723–1795), the grandfather of Robert Peel, merchant, experimented with calico printing, created parsley leaf pattern
- S. M. Holden (1862–1943), journalist and political activist; in 1923, stood for MP for the National Prohibition Party
- Basil G. Catterns (1886–1969), the chief cashier and deputy governor of the Bank of England
- Ethel Holdsworth (1886–1962), a working-class writer, feminist, socialist, poet, journalist and children's writer
- Nicholas Freeston (1907–1978), Lancashire poet, worked at a local cotton mill
- Sir Brian Cubbon (1928–2015), senior civil servant, Press Complaints Commissioner from 1995 to 2002.
- Polly James (born 1941), TV actress, played Beryl Hennessey in The Liver Birds
- Raymond "Ossie" Clark, (1942–1996), fashion designer, nicknamed "Ossie" after the town
- Gordon Birtwistle (born 1943), Liberal Democrats MP for Burnley from 2010 to 2015
- Sir John Tomlinson (born 1946), an English operatic bass.

=== Sport ===
- Joe Eddleston (1896–1959), footballer who played 432 games, mainly for Nelson & Swindon Town
- Eddie Paynter (1901–1979), cricketer, played 20 test cricket matches and 352 first-class cricket matches
- Jackie Bray (1909–1982), footballer, played 257 games for Manchester City and 5 for England
- George Bray (1918–2002), footballer who played 241 games for Burnley
- Mike Duxbury (born 1959), footballer, played 391 games, mainly for Manchester United and ten for England
- Joel Byrom (born 1986), former footballer, played 395 games

== Twinned town ==
In January 2017, the Carnegie Trust UK advertised for towns who wanted to take part in a pilot twin town scheme. Oswaldtwistle was chosen, and paired with Whitburn in Scotland. Initial visits have been made.

- Whitburn, West Lothian, Scotland

== See also ==
- Listed buildings in Oswaldtwistle
