= Shobnall =

Settlement and civil parish in East Staffordshire, Staffordshire, England

Coordinates: 52.807°N 1.653°W

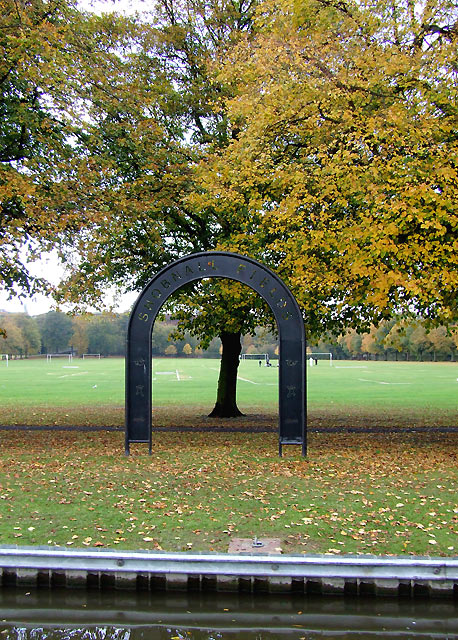
Shobnall Fields, Burton-upon-Trent Seen from the Trent and Mersey Canal.

Shobnall is a settlement and civil parish located in Staffordshire, England. It covers an area located in the west of Burton upon Trent. The population of Shobnall taken at the 2011 census was 5,071.

== See also ==
- Listed buildings in Shobnall
