= Crocheted lace =

Application of the art of crochet to create lace

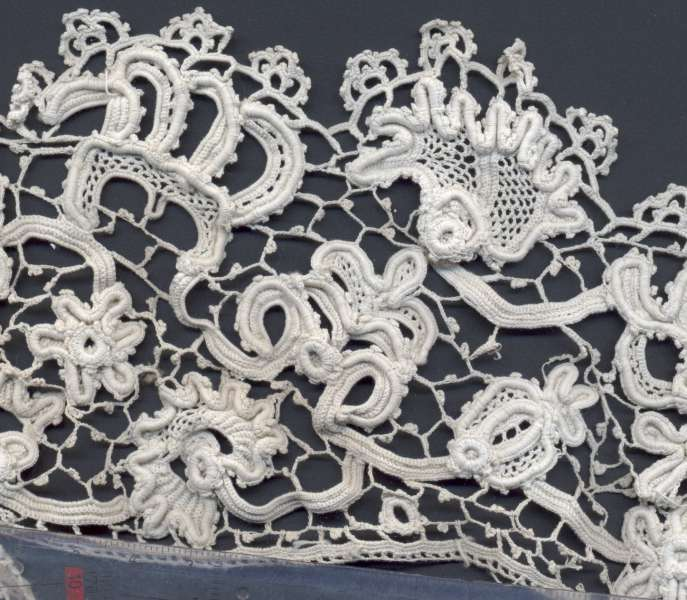
19th century Irish crochet

Crocheted lace is the application of the art of crochet to create lace. It usually incorporates fine threads and more decorative styles of stitching, often with flowing lines or scalloped edges. Variation of the size of the holes is part of what gives a piece its "lacy" look.

Originally, crocheted lace was not regarded as "true" lace. Crocheting was considered an easy and less time-consuming, but otherwise clearly inferior, surrogate for "true" lace such as bobbin lace, needle lace or netting. The first examples of crocheted lace tried to reproduce the products of other lacemaking techniques as faithfully as possible; over time, the many possibilities and inherent beauty of crocheted lace has become more widely appreciated.

== Styles ==
The main styles of crocheted lace include filet crochet, Irish crochet and its modern derivatives, pineapple crochet. Freeform crocheted lace also exists, examples of which often strive to imitate reticella lace.

Other varieties of crocheted lace include broomstick lace, hairpin crochet, Orvieto lace, Csetnek lace and Koniaków lace.

== Gallery ==
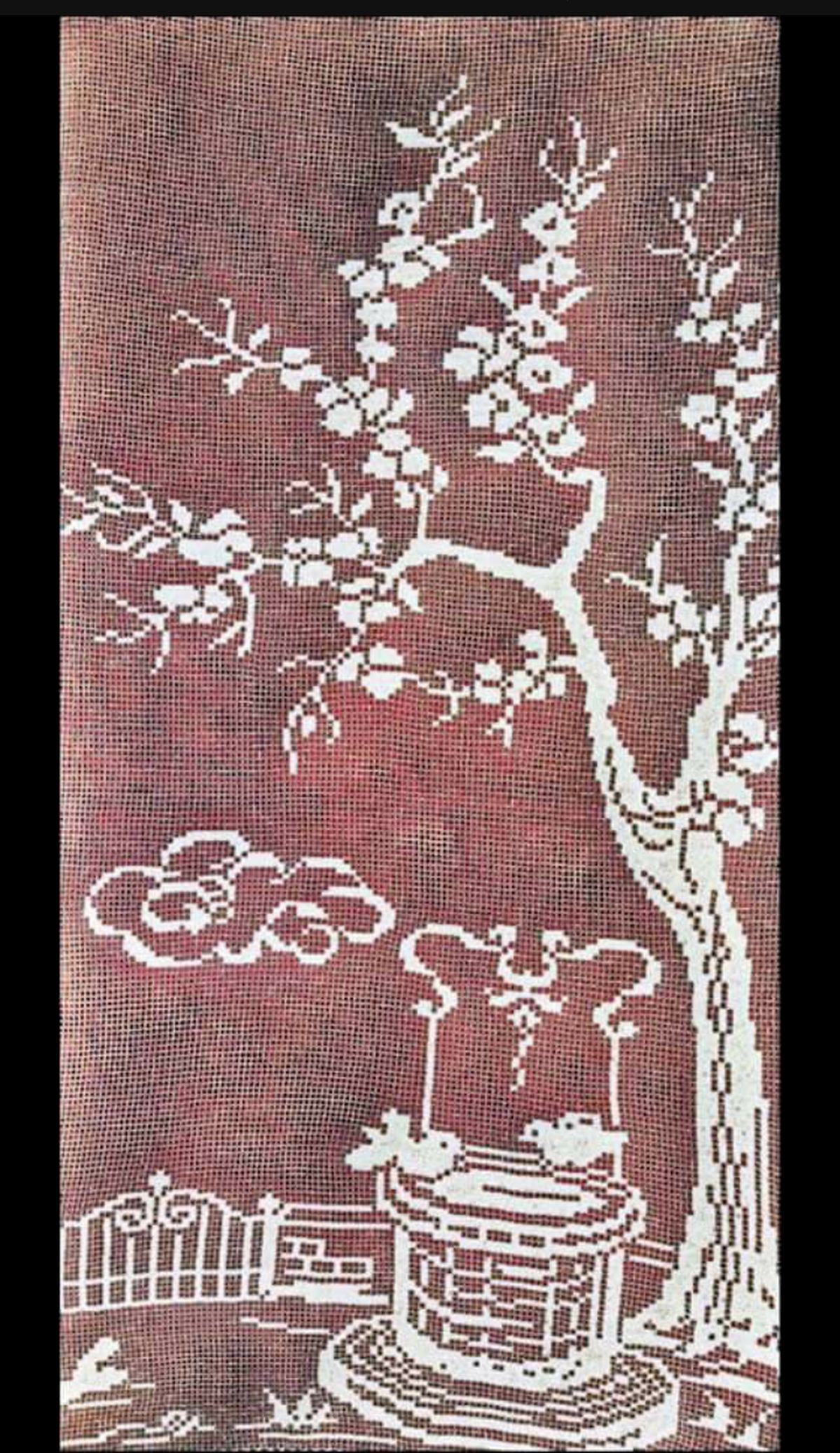
Italian Filet lace, crocheted

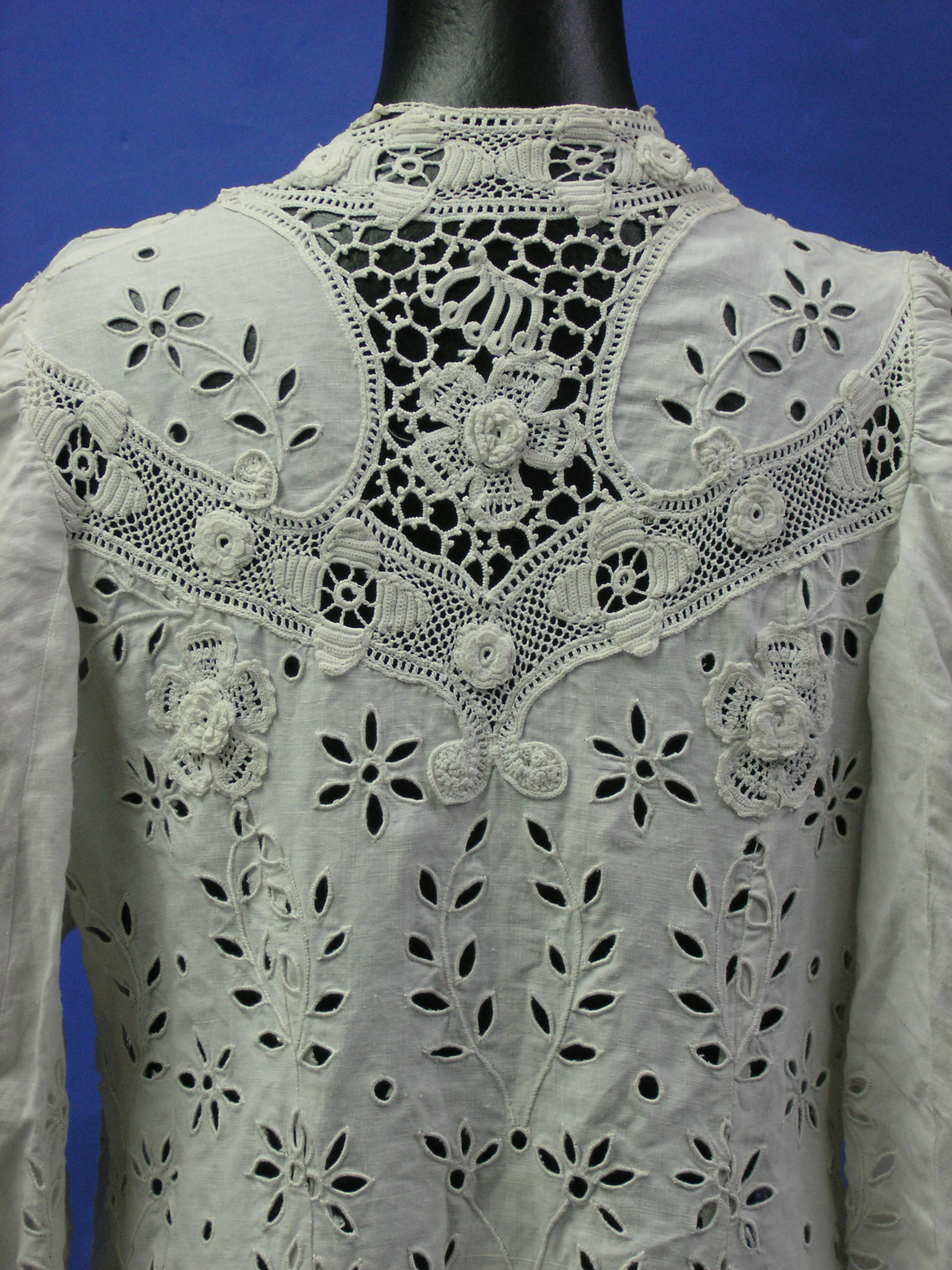
Irish crocheted lace coat with cutwork

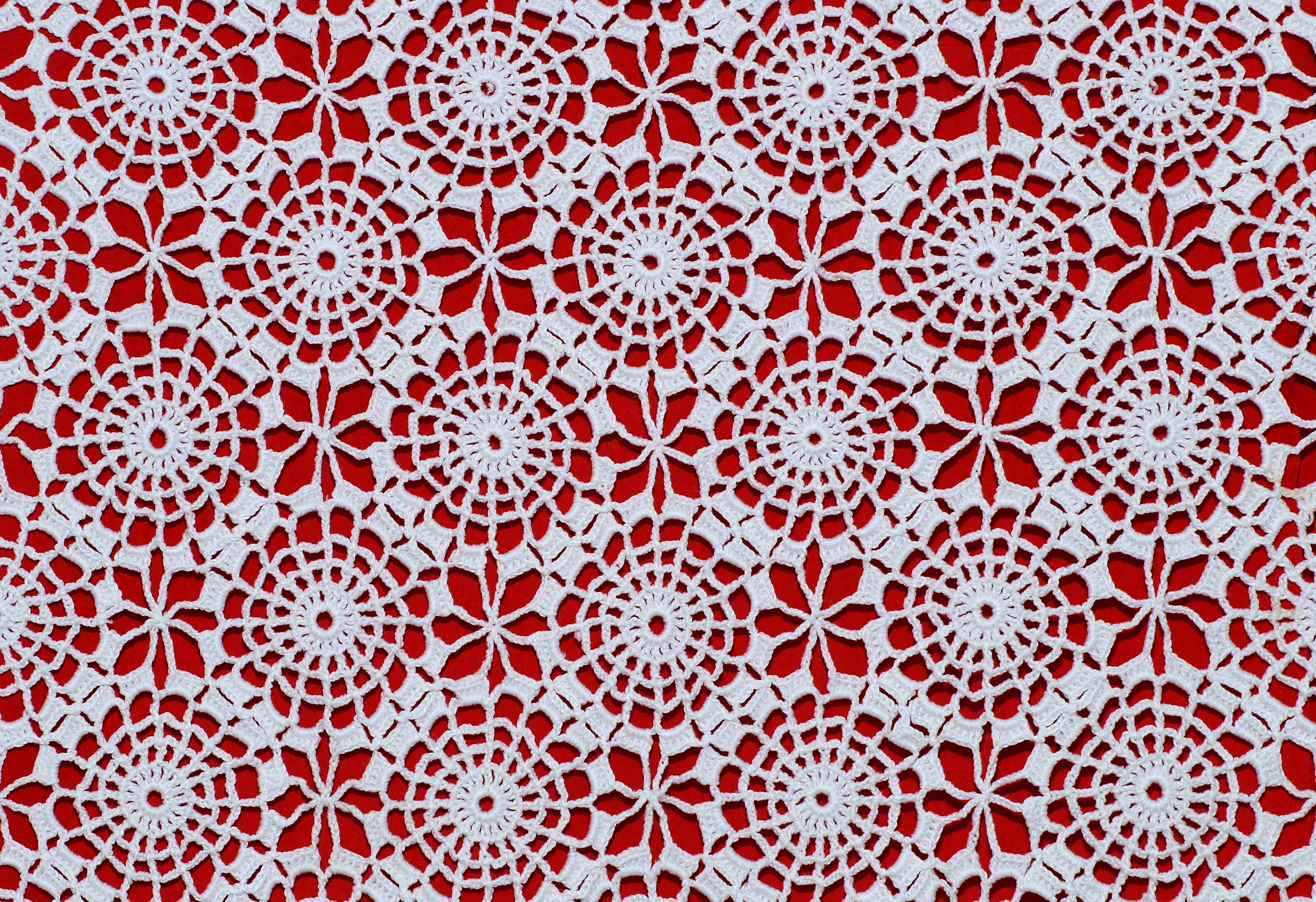
French crochet lace tablecloth detail

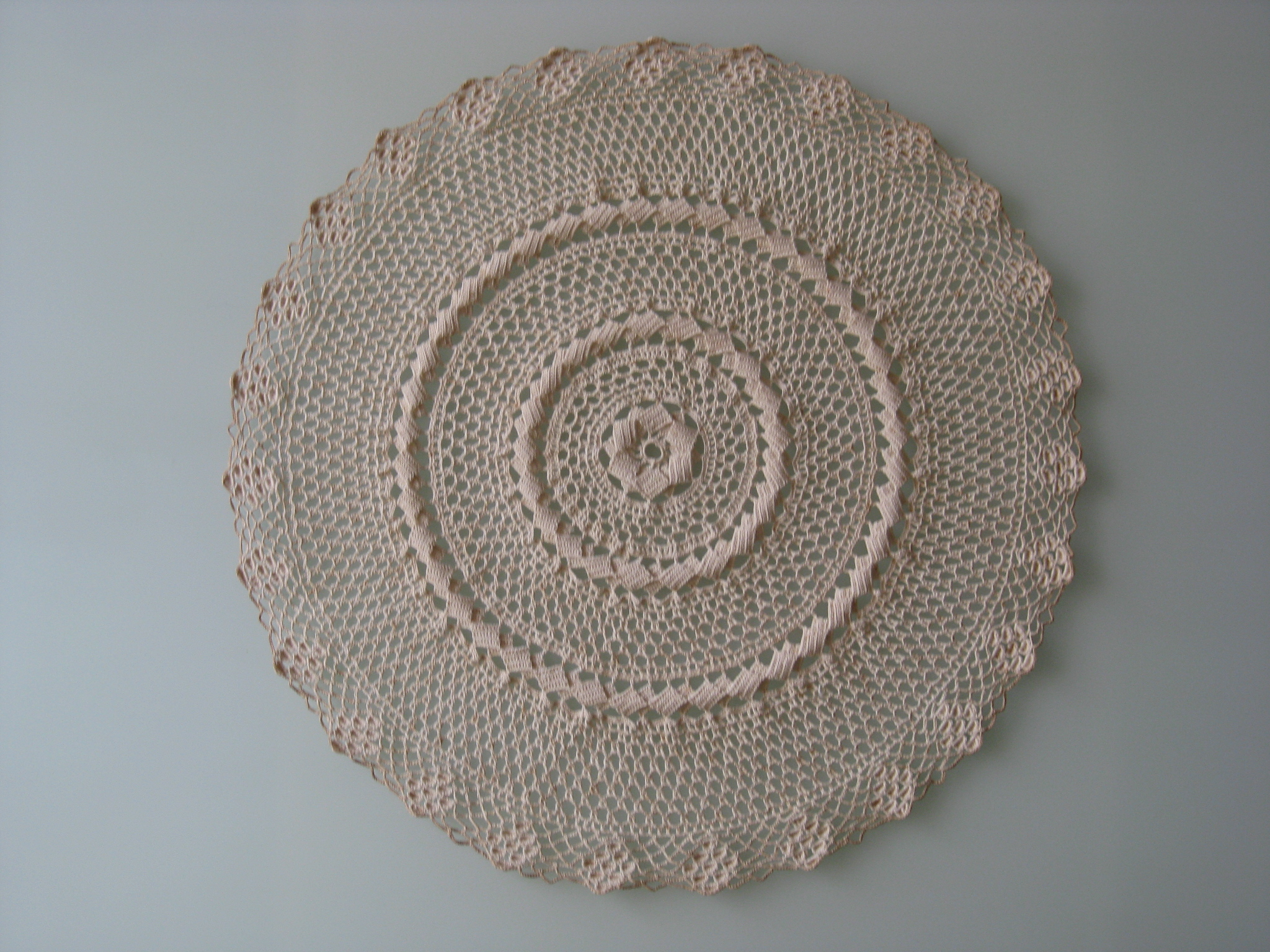
English crochet lace doily

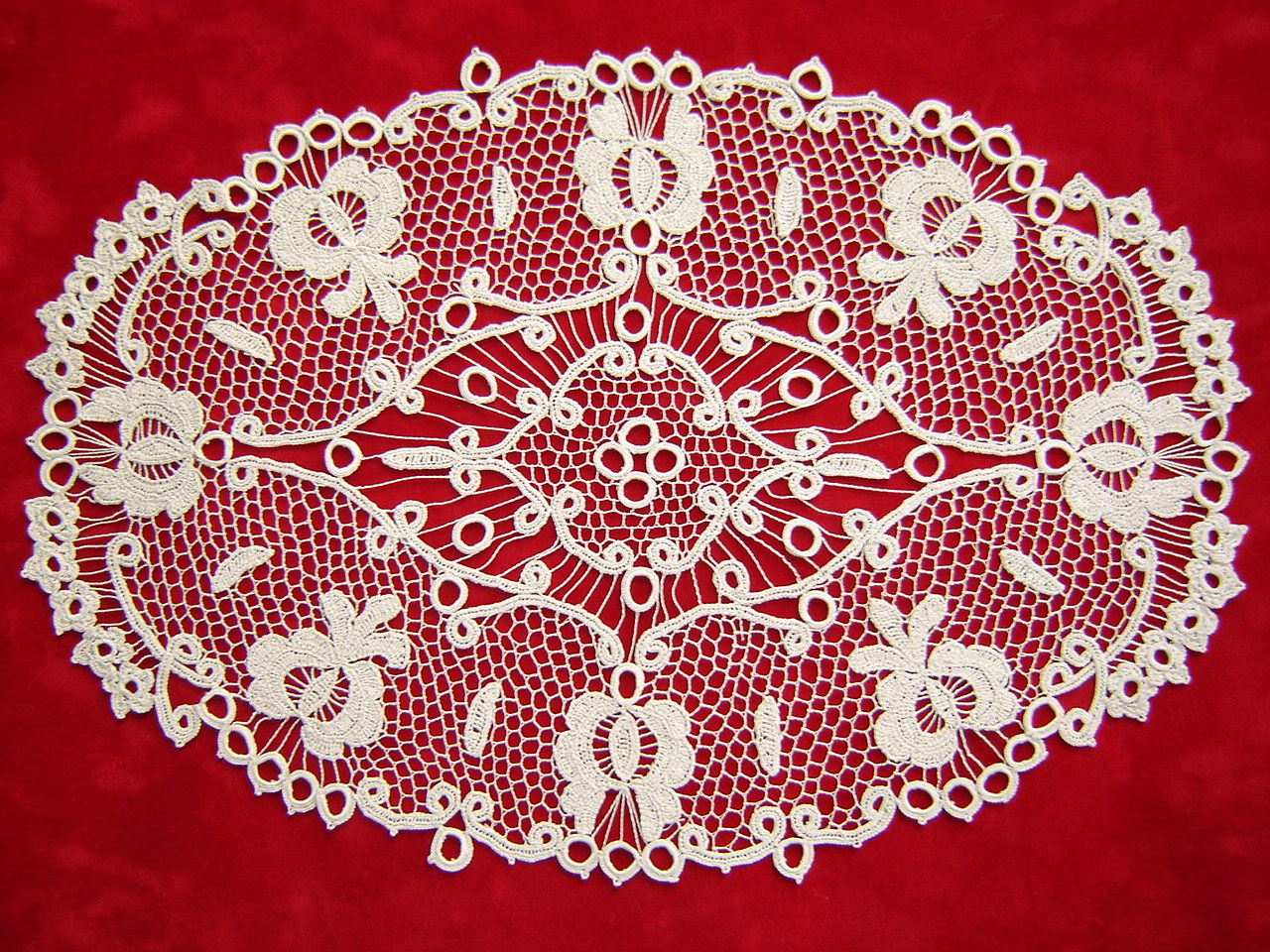
Csetneki crochet lace from Slovakia
