= Broomstick lace =

Type of crochet technique

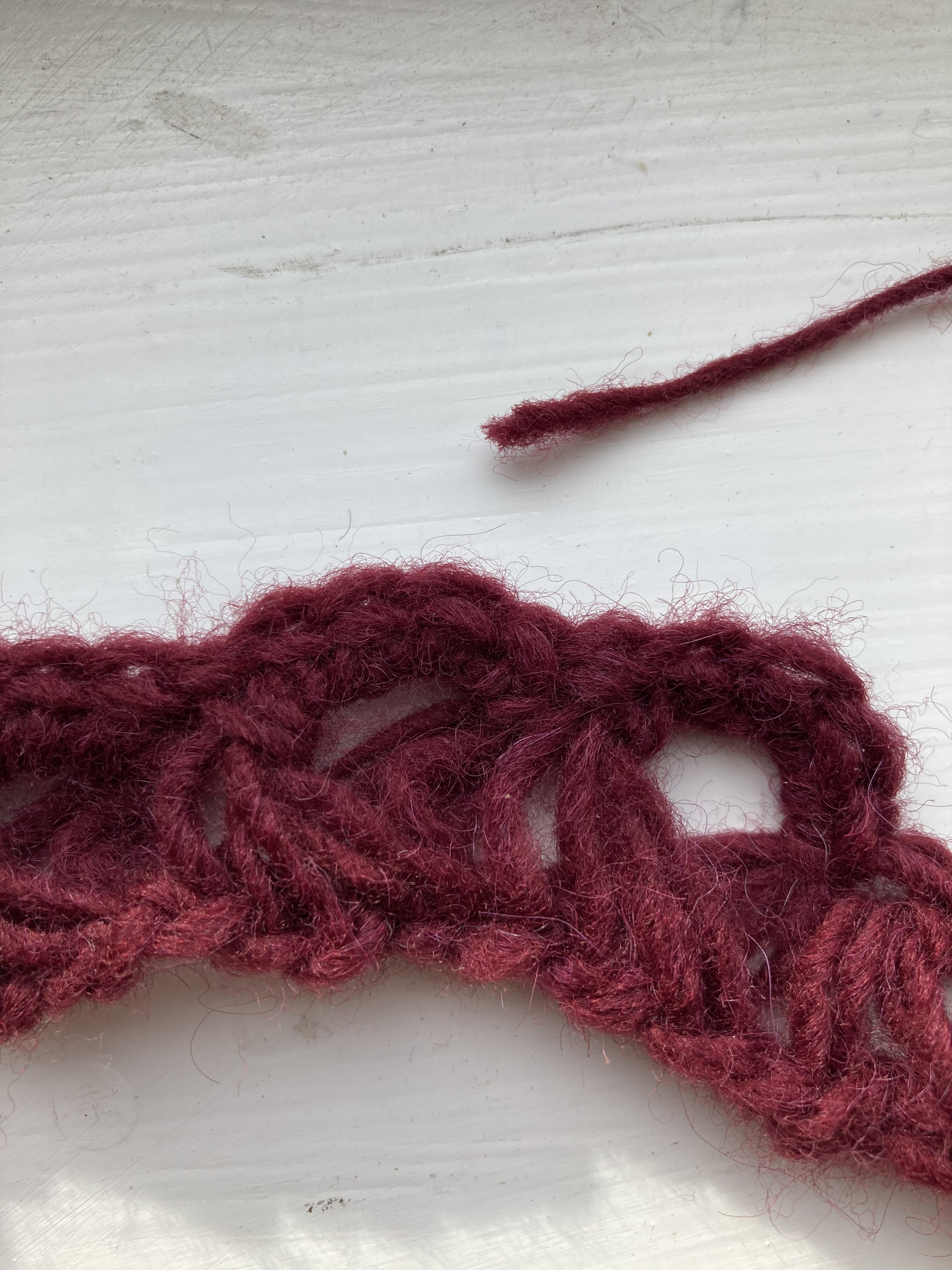
Example of broomstick lace

Broomstick lace, also known as jiffy lace and peacock eye crochet, is a historic crochet technique from the 19th century made using a crochet hook and another long slender item such as a knitting needle. Traditionally a broomstick was used, hence the name, but the modern variant is a lightweight plastic knitting needle or smooth wooden craft dowel. A larger knitting needle or dowel will result in a more lacy effect, while a smaller will provide a more closely woven effect. The technique is used to make clothing, blankets, and other crocheted items. In most crochet techniques, each stitch is finished before beginning the next. Broomstick lace is different; like in knitting and Tunisian crochet, many stitches are left open for broomstick lace.

== History ==
In Croatian folk costume in the 1800s and 1900s, needlework was often used to accent the sleeves of the oplećak (woman's blouse). One such needlework technique was broomstick lace.

== Technique ==
As with other forms of crochet the base of the pattern is a chain stitch. The number of stitches in this beginning chain are normally counted in multiples of 3 through 6, depending on the desired effect. The first row can either be immediately done in Broomstick lace, or instead incorporate a single or half-double crochet stitches. The "broomstick" or knitting needle is then used in the next row, as the crocheter pick up a loop through each of the stitches in row one and transfer it from the crochet hook onto the needle or dowel. This part of the process is similar to knitting as all stitches in the row are being picked up and held at one time on the knitting needle being used. Once a loop has been pulled up through every stitch, the loops are then worked back off the dowel by sliding them off in groupings of 3, 4, 5, or 6 loops (depending on the desired effect) at a time and working the same amount of single or half-double crochet stitches through the top of each group of loops at the same time.

The overall appearance of the work will vary based upon the number of loops in a group, the size of the knitting needle being used, as well as the type of yarn being used. Typical items made using this technique include afghans, baby blankets, scarves, shawls, and other items where an unusual lacy effect may be desired.
