= Hook gauge =

Tool for measuring the size of knitting needles and crochet hooks

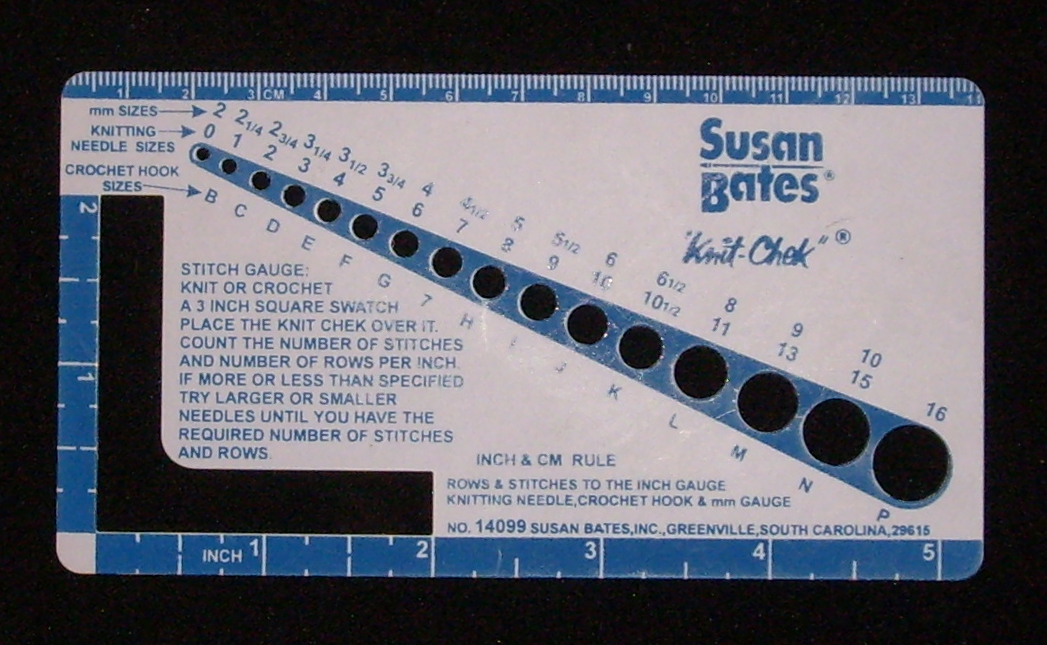
A hook gauge.

A hook gauge or needle gauge is a measuring device used by crocheters and knitters to test the sizes of particular crochet hooks and knitting needles. Hook gauges are usually made of plastic or aluminum and have sizing holes from 2mm to 11mm diameter. A hook gauge also functions as a ruler to test the size of a test swatch of handmade fabric.

== Sizing conventions ==
A hook gauge is the most reliable way to determine the actual size of a tool. Even though most hooks and needles have metric sizing, tool dimensions vary slightly between different manufacturers. Non-metric sizing conventions also change over time. For instance, different sizing charts rate a 4.0mm hook as either a U.S. G/6 or an F/5.

== Importance of accurate sizing ==
U.S. textile craft terminology employs the word gauge in two different ways: as hook gauge in reference to the sizing tool, or as a standalone term gauge to describe the number of stitches in a standard sized sample of work, usually 4" or 10cm. UK terminology refers to the latter as tension. Craft patterns include a gauge or tension measurement and good practice among crafters is to achieve the correct gauge on a sample swatch before embarking on the full project.

As one crochet guidebook explains:

Whenever you are following a crochet pattern you will notice that a gauge is included. This is an all-important guide to obtaining the proper size of the square or garment you are working on. If you don't get the proper gauge, the item will not fit properly and you may run out of yarn before finishing.

Several factors affect fabric gauge, including hook or needle size, although sometimes a crafter may change tool size deliberately in order to achieve a certain gauge. Accurate needle and hook sizing reduces the number of variables that affect these decisions. Additionally, if substitute tools are needed during the course of the project a hook gauge can determine whether a given tool is appropriate in advance of actual work.
