= Cro-hook =

Double-ended crochet hook

The cro-hook is a special double-ended crochet hook used to make double-sided crochet. It uses a long double-ended hook, which permits the maker to work stitches on or off from either end. Because the hook has two ends, two alternating colors of thread can be used simultaneously and freely interchanged, working loops over the hook. Crafts using a double-ended hook are commercially marketed as Cro-hook and Crochenit. Cro-hook is a variation of Tunisian crochet and also shows similarities with the Afghan stitch used to make Afghan scarves, but the fabric is typically softer with greater elasticity.
