= Crochet =

Technique of creating lace or fabric from thread using a hook

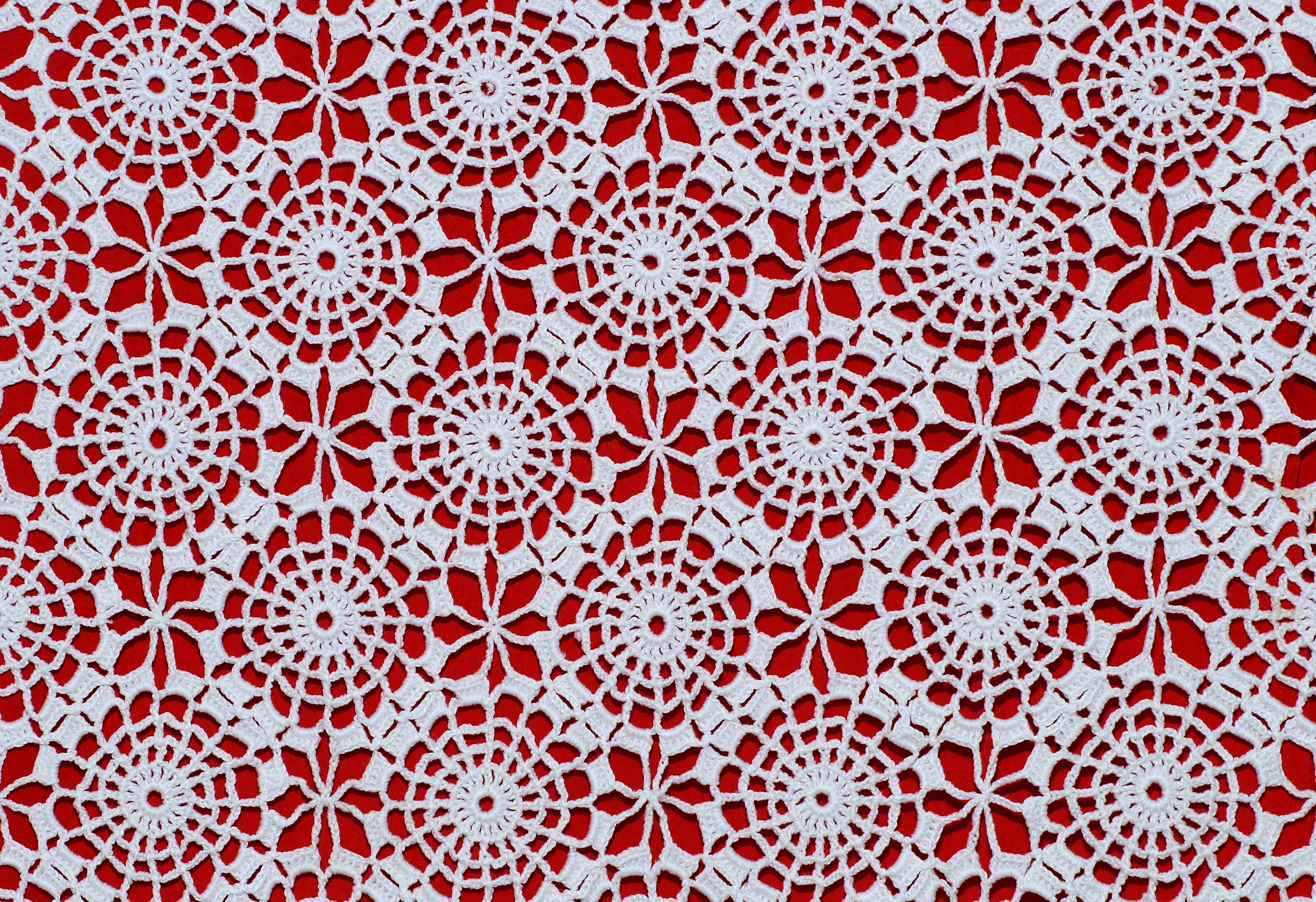
Detail of a Portuguese crocheted tablecloth, about 1970

Crochet (English: /kroʊˈʃeɪ/; French: [kʁɔʃɛ]) is a process of creating textiles by using a crochet hook to interlock loops of yarn, thread, or strands of other materials. The name is derived from the French term crochet, which means 'hook'. Hooks can be made from different materials (aluminum, steel, metal, wood, bamboo, bone, etc.), sizes ( 2.0mm, 2.5mm, 3.0mm, 3.5mm), and types (in-line, tapered, ergonomic, etc.). The key difference between crochet and knitting, beyond the implements used, is that each stitch in crochet is completed before the next one, while knitting keeps many stitches open at a time. Some variant forms of crochet however, such as Tunisian crochet and broomstick lace, do keep multiple crochet stitches open at a time.

== Etymology ==
The word crochet is derived from the French word crochet, a diminutive of croche, in turn from the Germanic croc, both meaning "hook". It was used in 17th-century French lace-making, where the term crochetage designated a stitch used to join separate pieces of lace. The word crochet subsequently came to describe both the specific type of textile and the hooked needle used to produce it.

In 1567, the tailor of Mary, Queen of Scots, Jehan de Compiegne, supplied her with silk thread for sewing and crochet, "soye à coudre et crochetz".

== Origins ==
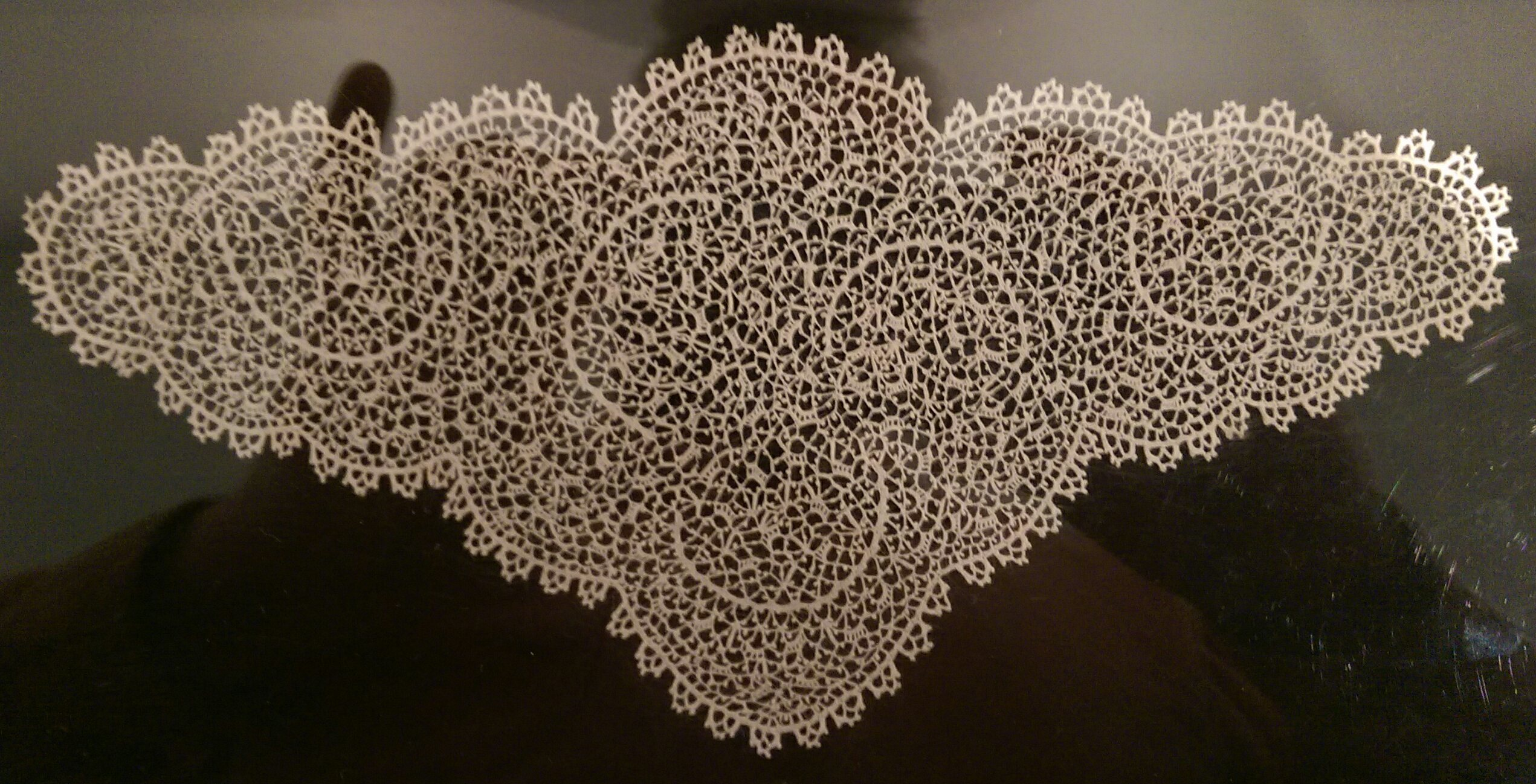
19th century crochet from Orvieto, Italy

Knitted textiles survive from as early as the 11th century CE, but the first substantive evidence of crocheted fabric emerges in Europe during the 19th century. Prior to the 19th century, classifications often failed to distinguish between crochet and knitting. Earlier work identified as crochet was commonly made by nålebinding, a different looped yarn technique.

Historian Lis Paludan reported three main theories for the origin of crochet, without providing sources of details. Those theories include origins in Middle East (where it spread through the Silk Road), China (where crochet dolls were supposed to be made) or South America (where supposedly crochet objects were used in puberty rites of an unnamed tribe). Paludan theorizes crochet evolved from tambour lace, that originated in Chinese and Indian practices, and claims that the craft would have abandoned mesh backing, with stitches self-supporting. Ann Stearns, describing Turkish 19th century textiles, describes tiğ oyasi (headscarf decorations) made with crochet techniques as firmly established in that tradition. Dora Ohrenstein theorizes that slip-stitch crochet evolved from nålebinding, and with the addition of tapestry colorwork to the craft a need for taller stitches emerged. Ohrenstein mentions jurabs (socks) of Pamir people photographed in 1890s and Finnish Korsnäs crochet yoke sweaters dating back to 1820s. As for South American connection, nålebinding was known there for a long time, and in 1916 Walter Roth documented slip-stitch crochet techniques of Carib and Macushi in his ethnographic study of people of Guyana. They were done with a hook, possibly developed independently from the Old World, and not tied to any "puberty rites".

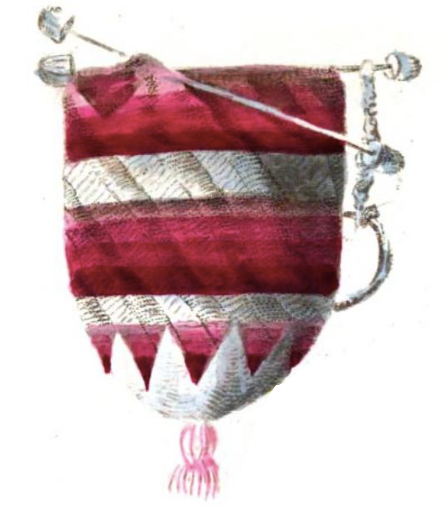
A crocheted purse described in 1823 in Penélopé

The first known published instructions for crochet explicitly using that term to describe the craft in its present sense appeared in the Dutch magazine Penélopé in 1823. This includes a color plate showing five styles of purse, of which three were intended to be crocheted with silk thread. The first is "simple open crochet" (crochet simple ajour), a mesh of chain-stitch arches. The second (illustrated here) starts in a semi-open form (demi jour), where chain-stitch arches alternate with equally long segments of slip-stitch crochet, and closes with a star made with "double-crochet stitches" (dubbelde hekelsteek: double-crochet in international terminology; single-crochet in US). The third purse is made entirely in double-crochet. The instructions prescribe the use of a tambour needle (as illustrated below) and introduce a number of decorative techniques.

The earliest dated reference in English to garments made of cloth produced by looping yarn with a hook—shepherd's knitting—is in The Memoirs of a Highland Lady by Elizabeth Grant (1797–1830). The journal entry itself is dated 1812 but was not recorded in its subsequently published form until some time between 1845 and 1867, and the actual date of publication was first in 1898. Nonetheless, the 1833 volume of Penélopé describes and illustrates a shepherd's hook, and recommends its use for crochet with coarser yarn.

In 1844, one of the numerous books discussing crochet that began to appear in the 1840s states:

Crochet needles, sometimes called Shepherds' hooks, are made of steel, ivory, or box-wood. They have a hook at one end similar in shape to a fish-hook, by which the wool or silk is caught and drawn through the work. These instruments are to be procured of various sizes...

Two years later, the same author writes:

Crochet, — a species of knitting originally practised by the peasants in Scotland, with a small hooked needle called a shepherd's hook, — has, within the last seven years, aided by taste and fashion, obtained the preference over all other ornamental works of a similar nature. It derives its present name from the French; the instrument with which it is worked being by them, from its crooked shape, termed 'crochet.' This art has attained its highest degree of perfection in England, whence it has been transplanted to France and Germany, and both countries, although unjustifiably, have claimed the invention.

An instruction book from 1846 describes Shepherd or single crochet as what in current international terminology is either called single crochet or slip-stitch crochet, with U.S. terminology always using the latter (reserving single crochet for use as noted above). It similarly equates "Double" and "French crochet".

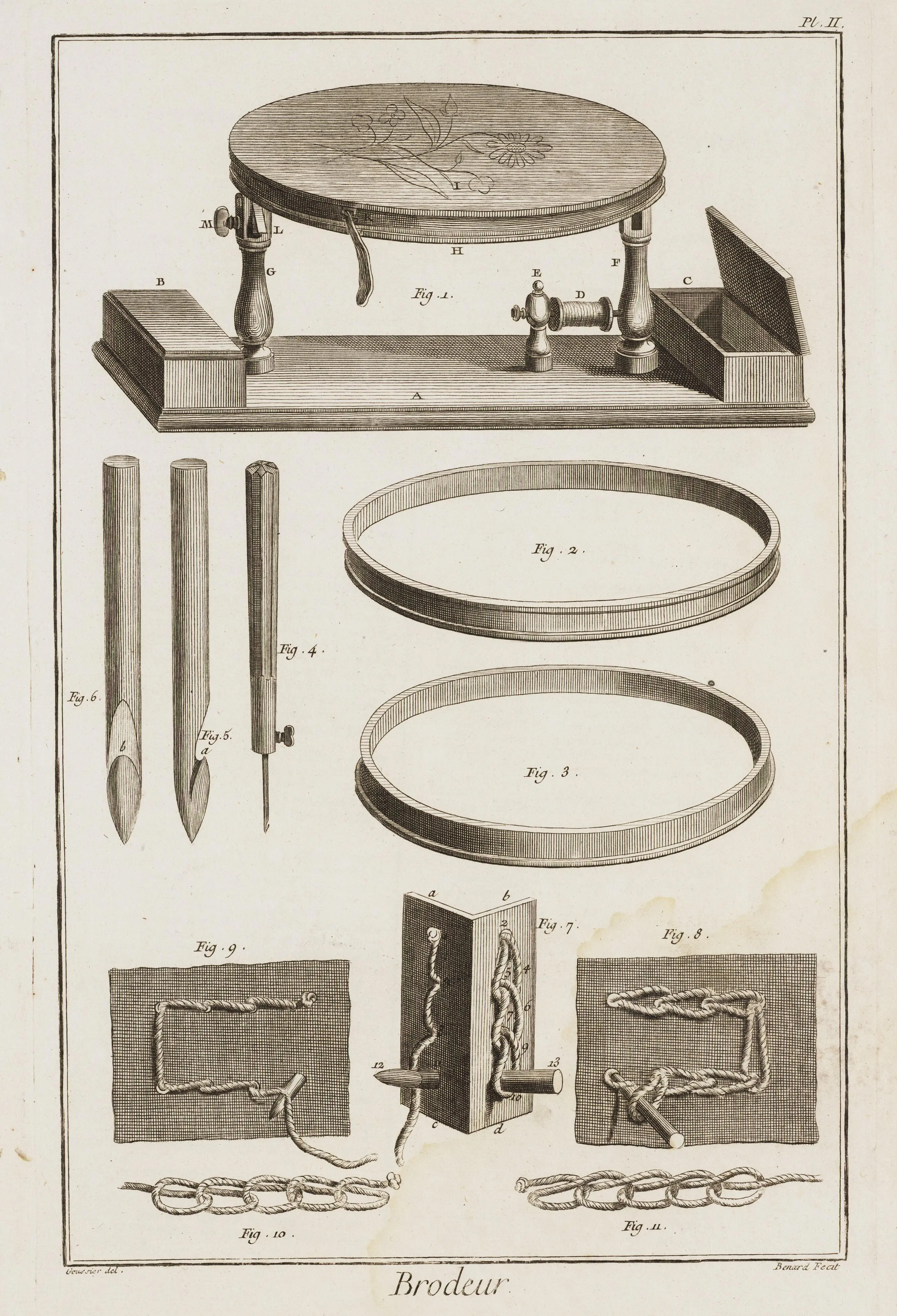
Tambour embroidery in the Diderot Encyclopedia

Not withstanding the categorical assertion of a purely British origin, there is solid evidence of a connection between French tambour embroidery, french passementerie and crochet. A form of hook known as crochet was used to create 'chains in the air' as part of passementerie back in the 17th century. This is confirmed by a patent issued to the passementiers by Louis XIV in 1653, and there are earlier decorative examples of this technique. The patent lists various items, including "thread for embroidery, enhanced and embellished as done with a needle, on thimbles, on the fingers, on a crochet, and on a bobbin." Similarly, chain stitch appears in Queen Elizabeth I's wardrobe accounts, starting in 1558, with further references to garments bordered with 'cheyne lace' in other inventories. One example from 1588 describes "a long cloak of murry velvet, with a border of small cheyne lace of Venice silver." While the exact design of the 1653 crochet is unclear, a 1723 French dictionary by Jacques Savary des Brûlons describes a crochet as a small iron instrument, three or four inches long, with a pointed, curved end and a wooden handle, used by passementiers for tasks like creating hat seams and attaching flowers to mesh. It is most likely that the hook used in crochet came from the ones used by the French pessamenterie industry. French tambour embroidery and the crochet needle used for it was illustrated in detail in 1763 in Diderot's Encyclopedia. The tip of the needle shown there is indistinguishable from that of a present-day inline crochet hook and the chain stitch separated from a cloth support is a fundamental element of the latter technique. The 1823 Penélopé instructions unequivocally state that the tambour tool was used for crochet and the first of the 1840s instruction books uses the terms tambour and crochet as synonyms. This equivalence is retained in the 4th edition of that work, 1847.

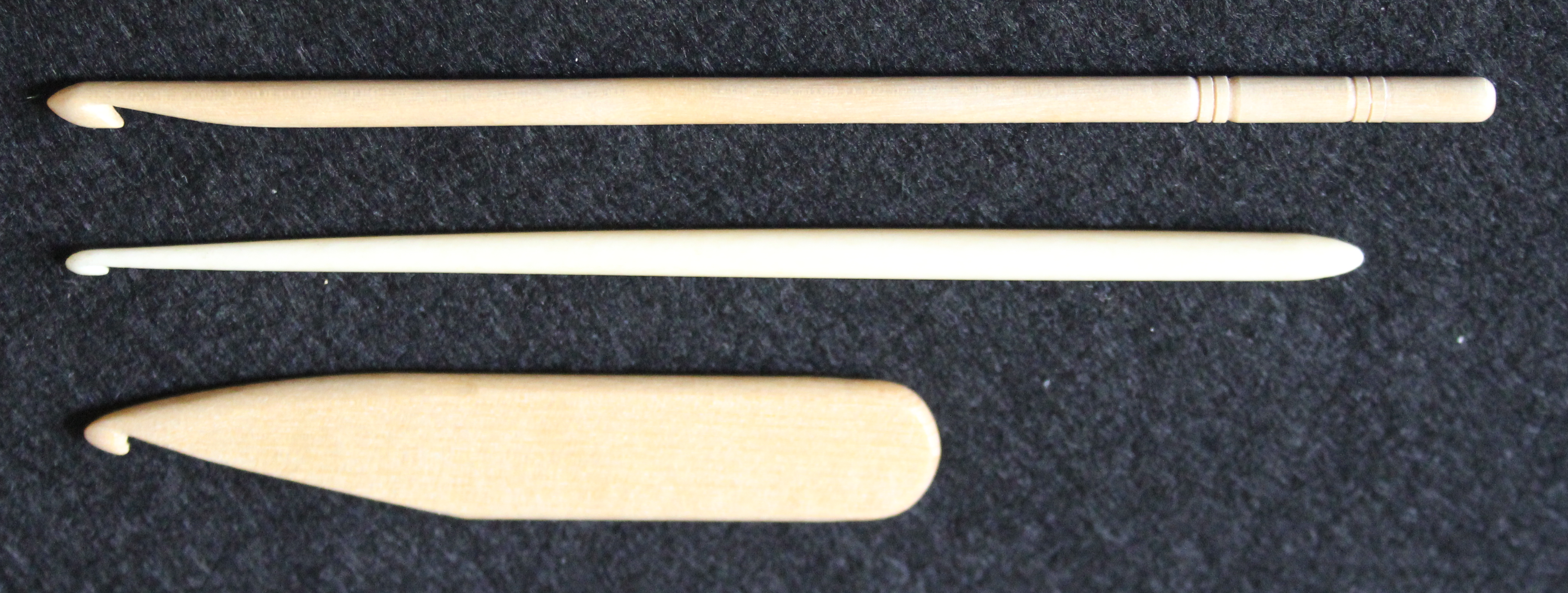
(bottom to top) Shepherd's hook, 19th-century tapered hook, modern inline hook

The strong taper of the shepherd's hook eases the production of slip-stitch crochet but is less amenable to stitches that require multiple loops on the hook at the same time. Early yarn hooks were also continuously tapered but gradually enough to accommodate multiple loops. The design with a cylindrical shaft that is commonplace today was largely reserved for tambour-style steel needles. Both types gradually merged into the modern form that appeared toward the end of the 19th century, including both tapered and cylindrical segments, and the continuously tapered bone hook remained in industrial production until World War II.

The early instruction books make frequent reference to the alternative use of 'ivory, bone, or wooden hooks' and 'steel needles in a handle', as appropriate to the stitch being made. Taken with the synonymous labeling of shepherd's- and single crochet, and the similar equivalence of French- and double crochet, there is a strong suggestion that crochet is rooted both in tambour embroidery and shepherd's knitting, leading to thread and yarn crochet respectively; a distinction that is still made. The locus of the fusion of all these elements—the "invention" noted above—has yet to be determined, as does the origin of shepherd's knitting.

== Irish crochet ==
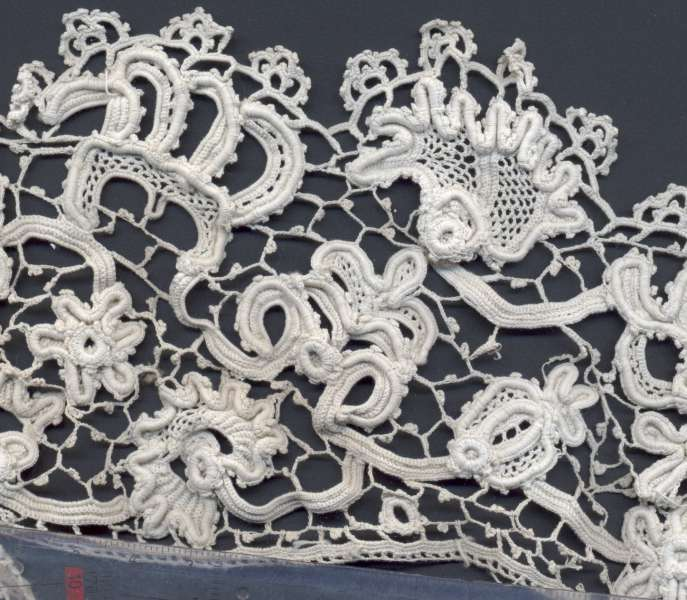
Irish crochet lace, late 19th century. The design of this example is closely based on Flemish needle lace of the 17th century.

In the 19th century, as Ireland was facing the Great Irish Famine (1845–1849), crochet lace work was introduced as a form of famine relief; the production of crocheted lace was an alternative way of making money for impoverished Irish workers. Men, women, and children joined a co-operative in order to crochet and produce products to help with famine relief during the famine. Schools to teach crocheting were started, and teachers were trained and sent across Ireland to teach this craft. When the Irish immigrated to the Americas, they were able to take crocheting with them. Mademoiselle Riego de la Branchardiere is generally credited with the invention of Irish crochet lace, publishing the first book of patterns in 1846. Irish lace became popular in Europe and America, and was made in quantity until the first World War.

== Modern practice and culture ==
Fashions in crochet changed with the end of the Victorian era in the 1890s.

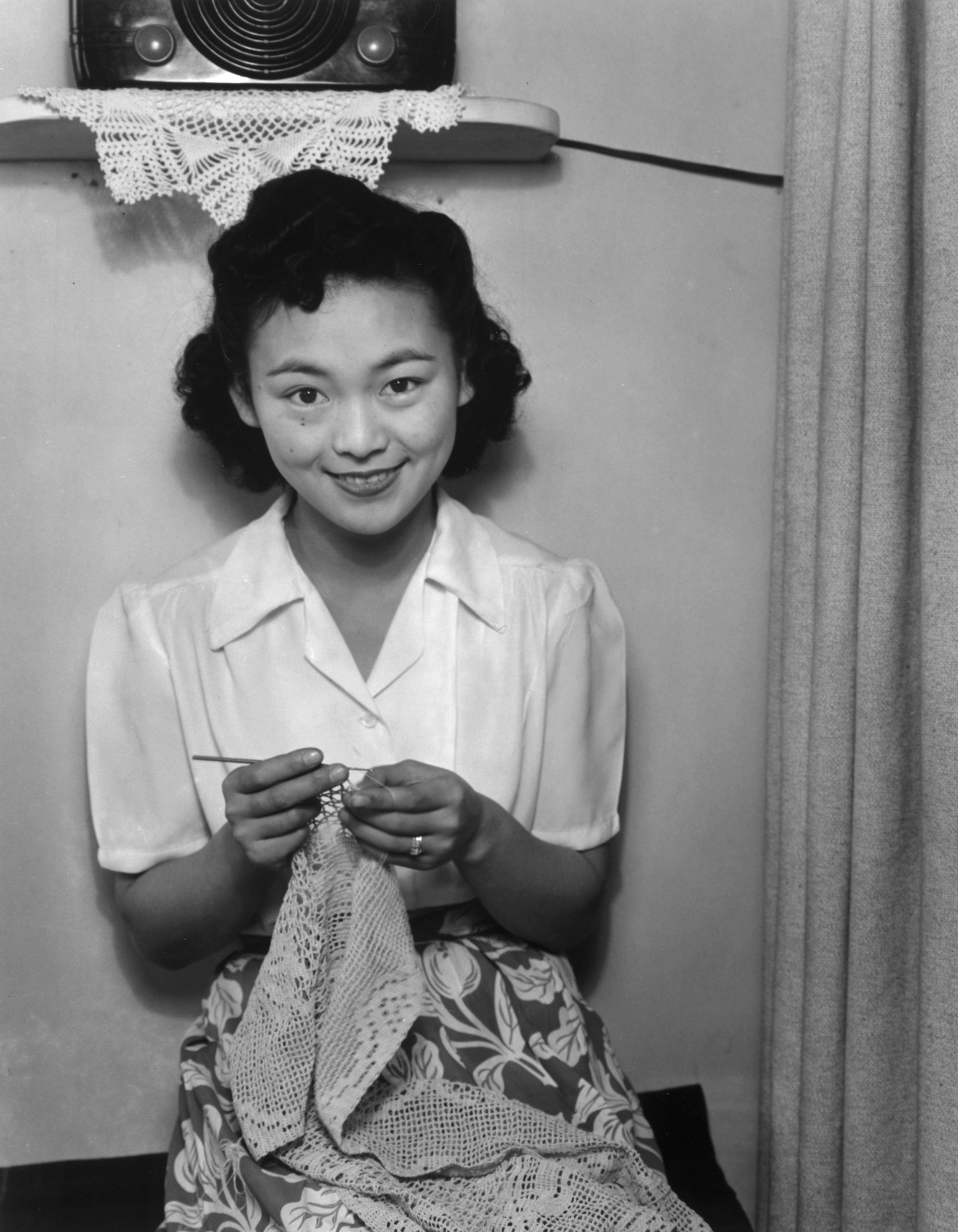
Filet crochet by an internee at Manzanar War Relocation Center, 1943. Photograph by Ansel Adams

The strong Victorian colors disappeared, and new publications called for white or pale threads, except for fancy purses, which were often crocheted of brightly colored silk and elaborately beaded. After World War I, far fewer crochet patterns were published, and most of them were simplified versions of the early 20th-century patterns. After World War II, from the late 1940s until the early 1960s, there was a resurgence in interest in home crafts, particularly in the United States, with many new and imaginative crochet designs published for colorful doilies, potholders, and other home items, along with updates of earlier publications. These commercial pattern books, such as the Kentucky Rug Yarns series, published by the January and Wood company, provided simplified instructions for practical household items. These patterns called for thicker threads and yarns than in earlier patterns and included variegated colors. The craft remained primarily a homemaker's art until the late 1960s and early 1970s, when the new generation picked up on crochet and popularized granny squares, a motif worked in the round and incorporating bright colors.

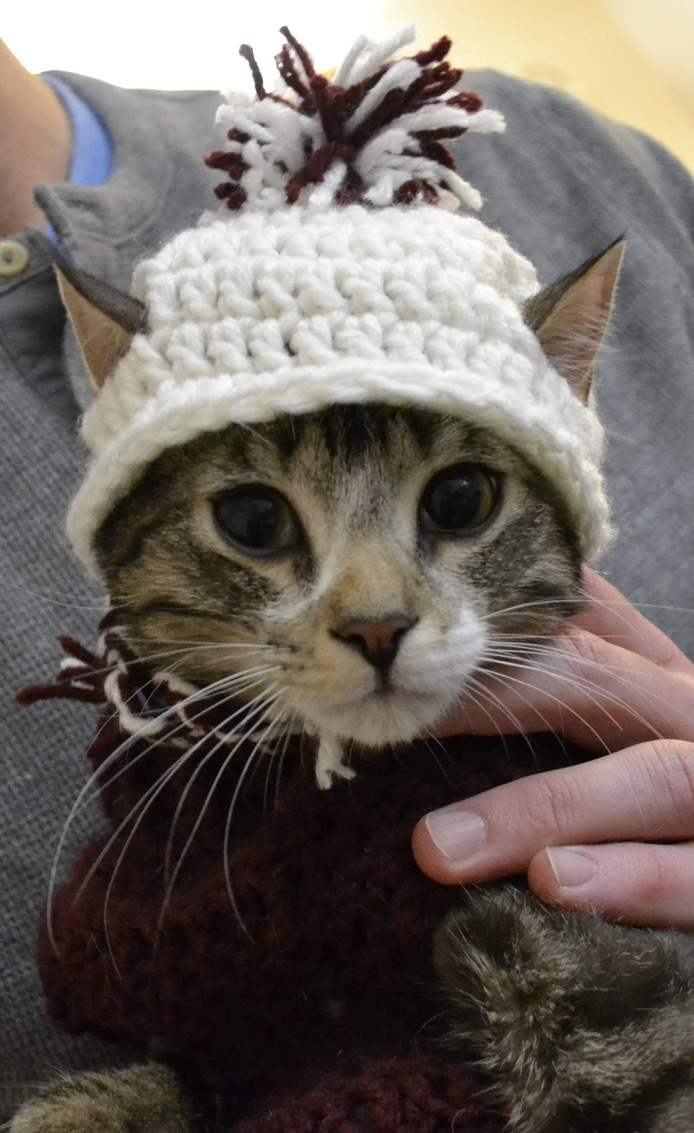
Examples of crocheted articles of clothing made specifically for a cat

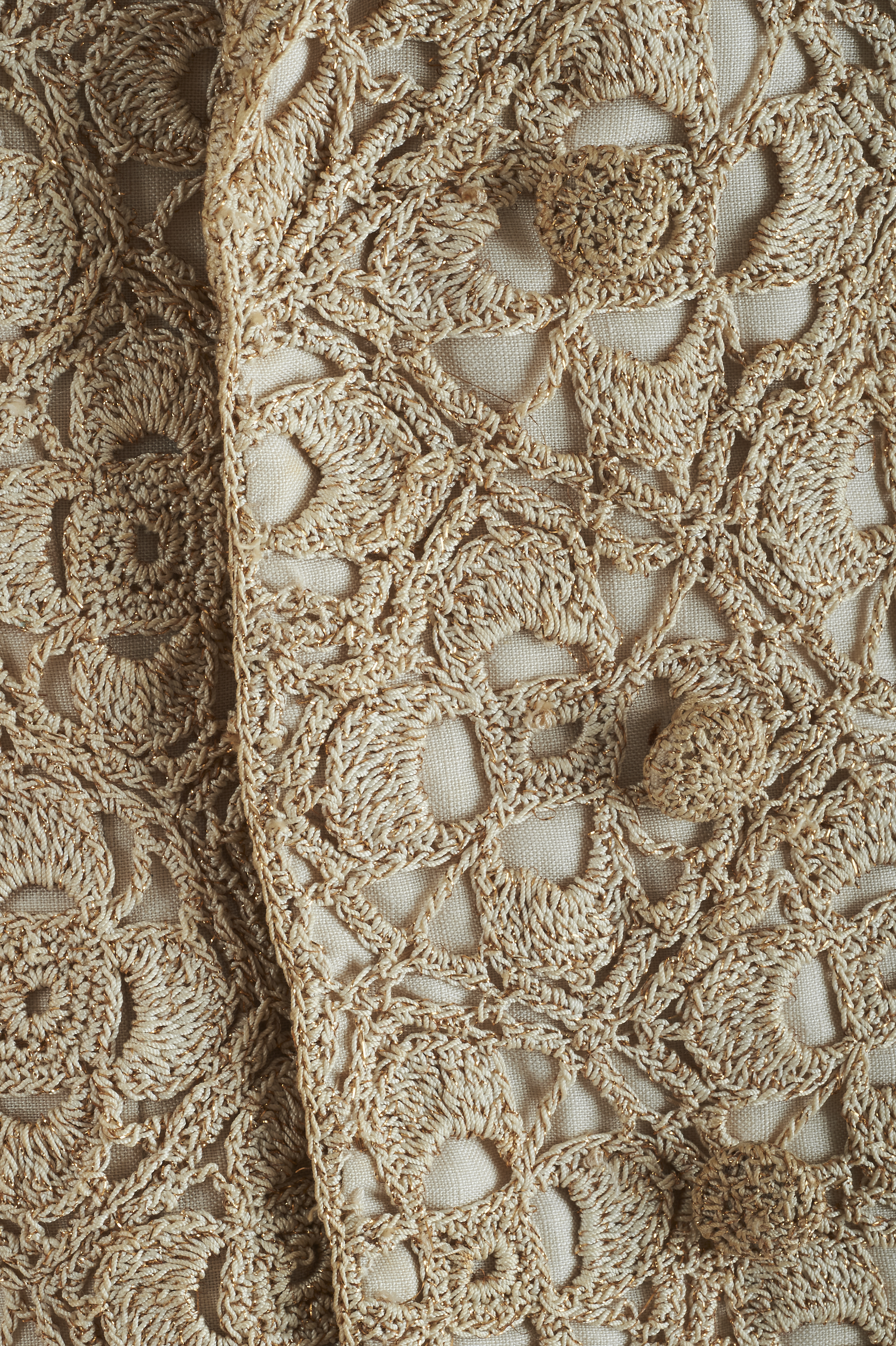
Detail on gold thread crochet in a mid-20th century short jacket designed by Sybil Connolly

Although crochet underwent a subsequent decline in popularity, the early 21st century has seen a revival of interest in handcrafts and DIY, as well as an improvement in the quality and varieties of yarn. As well as books and classes, there are YouTube tutorials and TikTok videos to help people who may need a clearer explanation to learn how to crochet. Crochet has been used as a medium to explore identity and self-expression in educational programs, bridging the gap between art and technology. The repetitive nature of the craft is also used as a therapeutic tool for stress relief, depression, and anxiety.

The COVID-19 pandemic has contributed to the rise of crocheting, since people were staying inside more and wanted to pick up new hobbies and activities. Crochet garments have also been popular recently, as it was worn by numerous pop culture icons like Harry Styles, Dua Lipa, and featured on the Netflix series Wednesday. Crochet has experienced a revival on the catwalk as well, such as in Christopher Kane's Fall 2011 Ready-to-Wear collection. Additionally, it was featured in luxury brands such as Moschino, who has crocheted skirts in their Ready-to-Wear Spring 2024 collection, and Miumiu, who have designed and sold several crocheted items from their brand such as a crocheted scrunchie. Online searches for crochet items have risen drastically with the trend skyrocketing, with a 32% rise in searches for the keyword 'crochet' on the online clothing site Depop. With the trend of crochet being on the rise in social media, fast fashion brands like Shein have been trying to create products that resemble crochet items.

Today, many popular crochet projects amongst youth include creating stuffed animals, hats, and even flowers. Websites such as Etsy and Ravelry have made it easier for individual hobbyists to sell and distribute their patterns or projects across the internet. Microentrepreneurs have used social media to share their designs and grow their business. They use social media accounts as a tool to measure their products popularity, stay relevant, and develop relationships with customers. A passive behavior such as liking or sharing will show up on a person's social media page which will encourage watchers to follow, view videos, and use hashtags related to that content for easier access in the future.

== Sustainability and crochet in fashion ==
Sustainability can be a key pillar of crochet, as it may use upcycled and environmentally friendly materials in yarn to create sustainable fabrics such as bamboo, hemp, cotton, linen, and wool. Since crochet is typically made by hand, although there are crochet machines in the process of being developed, crochet contributes to ethical production by adhering to the slow production of garments and accessories rather than the fast-paced and mechanized garments that are produced on a mass scale by the fast fashion industry.

Slow fashion is part of the "slow movement". The slow movement's objective in clothing and garment manufacturing is to promote respect for people, animals and the environment. Slow fashion supports local artists, the use of eco-friendly materials, and preserves craftsmanship. Since slow fashion promotes the skill of being able to crochet, it's able to provide jobs with a fair income for unemployed youths in Nigeria. Money created from selling the crochet products is a method to improve their standard of living and meet sustainable development goal 8 (SDG).

Slow fashion emphasizes the importance of providing high quality products over quantity, resulting in consumers being more aware of the ethics and process of material production and labor. A project called 'Mini Fashion Statement' was created in order to outline the condition of the factories/provide their opinions on the 'true cost' of fashion. Then these scrolls were placed in garments of fast fashion brands. The goal of this project was to raise awareness of ethical implications in the supply chain, which encourages consumers, who often purchase fast fashion, to rethink what they buy. (Corbett, 2019). Additionally, some people choose to crochet their own luxury items that are inspired by luxury fashion. The counterfeit crochet project was founded in 2006. Its goal was to bring to light that luxury can only be accessed by certain people. This project's goal was to encourage people to use their crochet skills to replicate luxury fashion like Chanel and Louis Vuitton rather than buying from those companies. Additionally, according to Kate Fletcher, slow fashion encourages using eco-friendly materials to minimize harm on the planet and to focus more on creating higher quality goods which in turn allows people to recognize the quality of different sustainable yarn such as natural fibers as well as recycled yarns. Additionally places like Milan offer markets where vendors from other regions come to sell yarn. Since the material comes locally the need to transport raw materials a long distance is reduced therefore reducing carbon emissions. Regional manufacturers also produce items closer to the point of consumption as it increases personal connection between consumer and producer, reduces carbon emission, and provides jobs.

In addition, crochet fabric can be loosened and undone easily to be reused in a new way. Crochet can be added to worn or torn garments and to add a stylistic enhancement, such as a collar or sleeves, which may contribute to upcycling of clothing. Crochet highlights the sustainability factor of quality versus quantity because of the customization aspect which can make crochet items more personalized. Another aspect of the sustainability of crochet is that crochet is versatile and can be used to create many different products eliminating the need to constantly buy new products.

Synthetic fibers and mixed fibers such as acrylic, polyester and nylon are quite commonly used. Synthetic fibers are not biodegradable and are not recyclable. Today, numerous garments, especially fast fashion, are made from synthetic fibers or mixed fibers. The amount of synthetic fibers used has increased significantly over the years. In 1990 natural fibers made up 60% of fiber consumption and in 2000 the number declined to 45%, with the number declining to 40% 8 years later. In 2009, 35.8 million tons of synthetic fibers were used and 23.3 million tons of cotton were used. In 2023, the amount of total fibers produced and used was 125 million fibers, and it increased to 132 million tons in 2024. The most commonly produced global synthetic fiber is polyester, making up 59%, with 88% of it being fossil based. If this trend continues, then the expected amount produced in 2030 is 169 million tons. This has more than doubled in the amount produced in 2009.

Many crochet and knit yarn brands have taken a stance on sustainability by aiming to increase the production of natural fibers such as organic cotton, hemp, wool and recycled yarns.

Creating crocheted items has become a way to make sustainable fashion. Fast fashion brands like Shein have created products that resemble crocheted items. Additionally, The Crochet-Style Button-Through Sweater Polo, by Abercrombie and Fitch resemble designs popular in the 1960s and 1970s. Although the pattern resembles crochet in reality it's made from a knit machine. These shirts are made from a combination of cotton, acrylic or viscose, which are a typical fabrication for fast-fashion pieces. Although Abercrombie may not consider itself fast fashion, there is little to suggest that its materials and design practices differ from Shein or Zara, other than the quantity of products made.

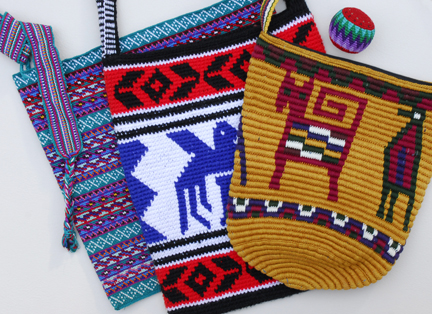
Bags and hacky sack tapestry crocheted in Guatemala

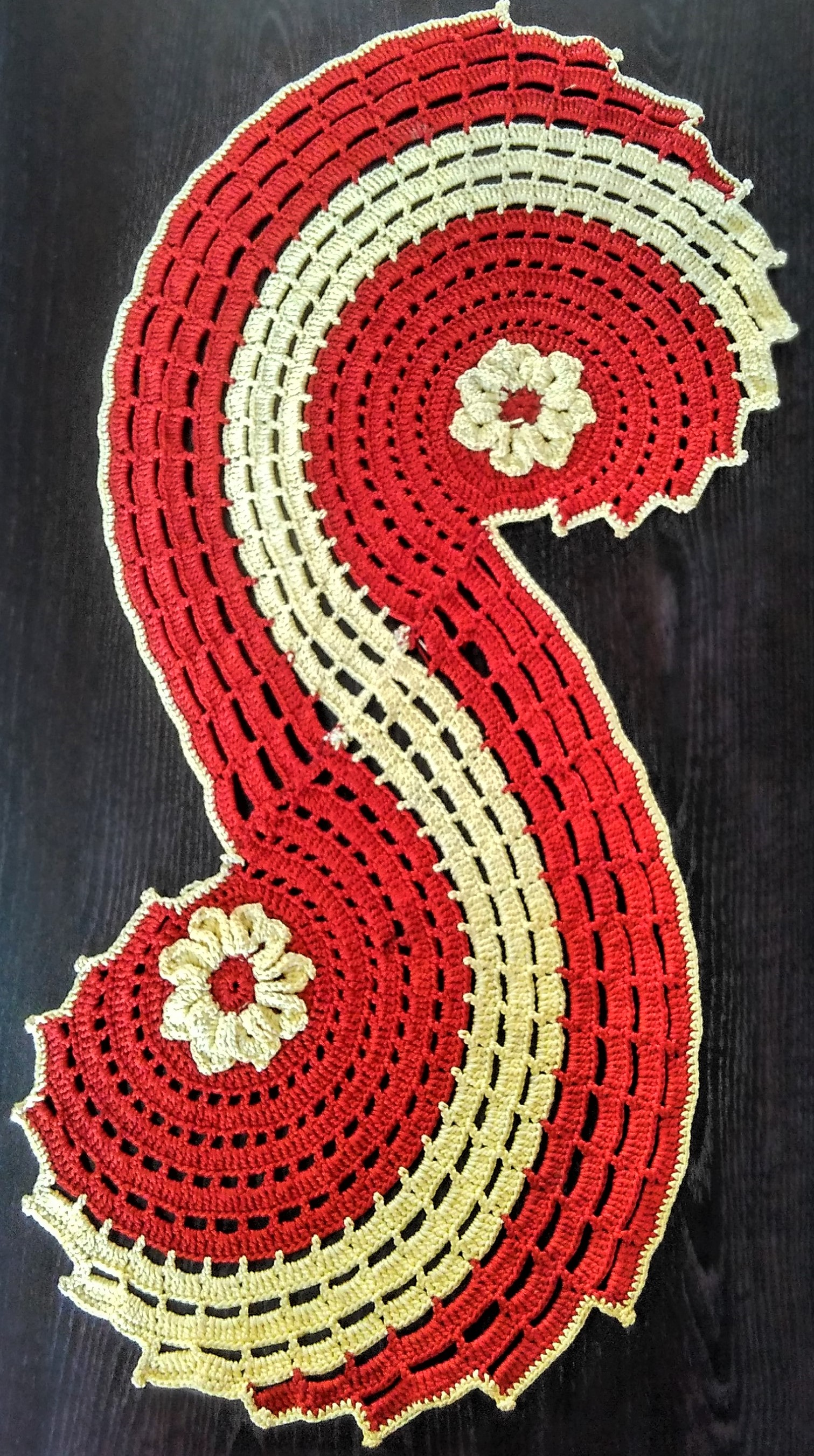
Crochet table decor, Kolkata, West Bengal, India

== Materials ==
The basic materials required for crocheting are a hook, scissors (to cut yarn), and some type of material that will be crocheted, the most commonly used are yarn or thread. Alternatively, some people choose to crochet with their hands, especially for large yarns. Yarn, one of the most commonly used materials for crocheting, has varying weights which need to be taken into consideration when following patterns. The weight of the yarn can affect not only the look of the product but also the feeling. Acrylic can also be used when crocheting, as it is synthetic and an alternative to wool. Additional tools are convenient for making related accessories. Examples of such tools include cardboard cutouts, which can be used to make tassels, fringe, and many other items; a pom-pom circle, used to make pom-poms; a tape measure and a gauge measure, both used for measuring crocheted work and counting stitches; a row counter; and occasionally plastic rings, which are used for special projects. In recent years, yarn selections have moved beyond synthetic and plant and animal-based fibers to include bamboo, qiviut, hemp, and banana stalks, to name a few. Many advanced crocheters have also incorporated recycled materials into their work in an effort to "go green" and experiment with new textures by using items such as plastic bags, old T-shirts or sheets, VCR or cassette tape, and ribbon.

=== Crochet hook types ===
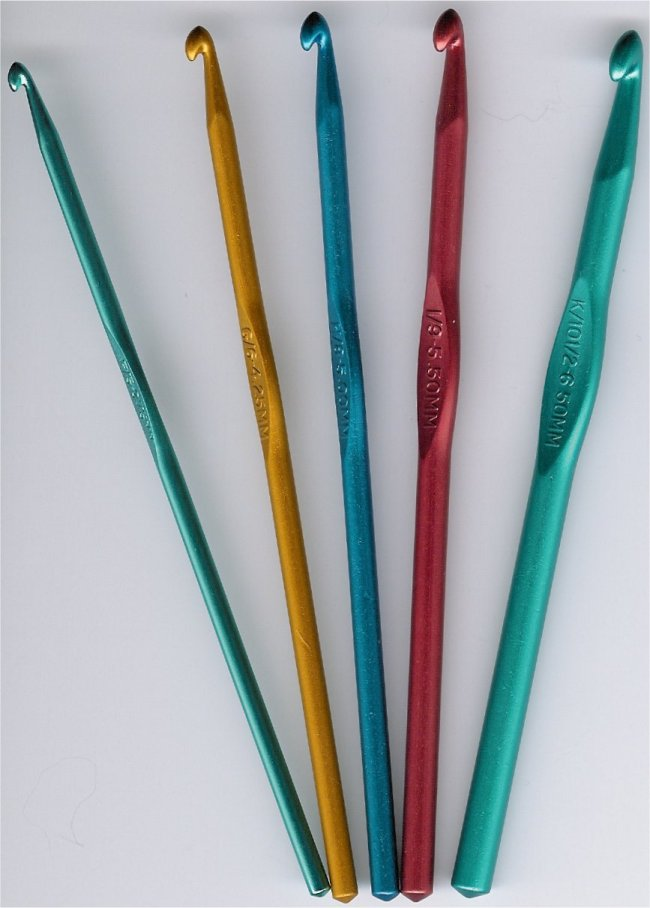
Aluminium crochet hooks

The crochet hook comes in many sizes and materials. Because sizing is categorized by the diameter of the hook's shaft, a crafter aims to create stitches of a certain size in order to reach a particular gauge specified in a given pattern. If gauge is not reached with one hook, another is used until the stitches made are the needed size. Crafters may have a preference for one type of hook material over another due to aesthetic appeal, yarn glide, or hand disorders such as arthritis, where bamboo or wood hooks are favored over metal for the perceived warmth and flexibility during use. Hook grips and ergonomic hook handles are also available to assist crafters.

Aluminum, bamboo, and plastic crochet hooks are available from 2.25 to 30 millimeters in size, or from B-1 to T/X in American sizing. Artisan-made hooks are often made of hand-turned woods, sometimes decorated with semi-precious stones or beads.

Steel crochet hooks are sized in a reverse manner – the higher the number, the smaller the hook. They range in size from 0.9 to 2.7 millimeters, or from 14 to 00 in American sizing. These hooks are used for fine crochet work such as doilies and lace.

Crochet hooks used for Tunisian crochet are elongated and have a stopper at the end of the handle, while double-ended crochet hooks have a hook on both ends of the handle. Tunisian crochet hooks are shaped without a fat thumb grip and thus can hold many loops on the hook at a time without stretching some to different heights than others (Solovan). There is also a double hooked tool called a Cro-hook. While this is not in itself a hook, it is a device used in conjunction with a crochet hook to produce stitches.

=== Yarn types ===
Yarn for crochet is usually sold as balls, or skeins (hanks), although it may also be wound on spools or cones. It can be had in a variety of colours and common materials are acrylic, cotton, and sheep wool. Speciality yarns like glitter yarn can also be found.

The thickness or weight of the yarn is a significant factor in determining how many stitches and rows are required to cover a given area for a given stitch pattern. This is also termed the gauge. Thicker yarns generally require large-diameter crochet hooks, whereas thinner yarns may be crocheted with thick or thin hooks. Hence, thicker yarns generally require fewer stitches, and therefore less time, to work up a given project. The recommended gauge for a given ball of yarn can be found on the label that surrounds the skein when buying in stores. Patterns and motifs are coarser with thicker yarns and produce bold visual effects, whereas thinner yarns are best for refined or delicate pattern-work. Yarns are standardly grouped by thickness into six categories: superfine, fine, light, medium, bulky and superbulky.

== Process ==
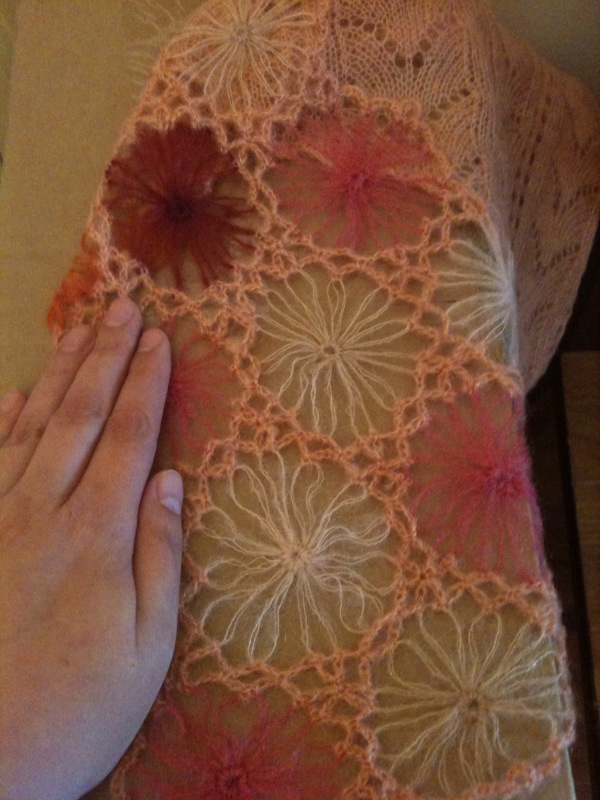
A close view of a crocheted scarf made with lace-weight mohair yarn

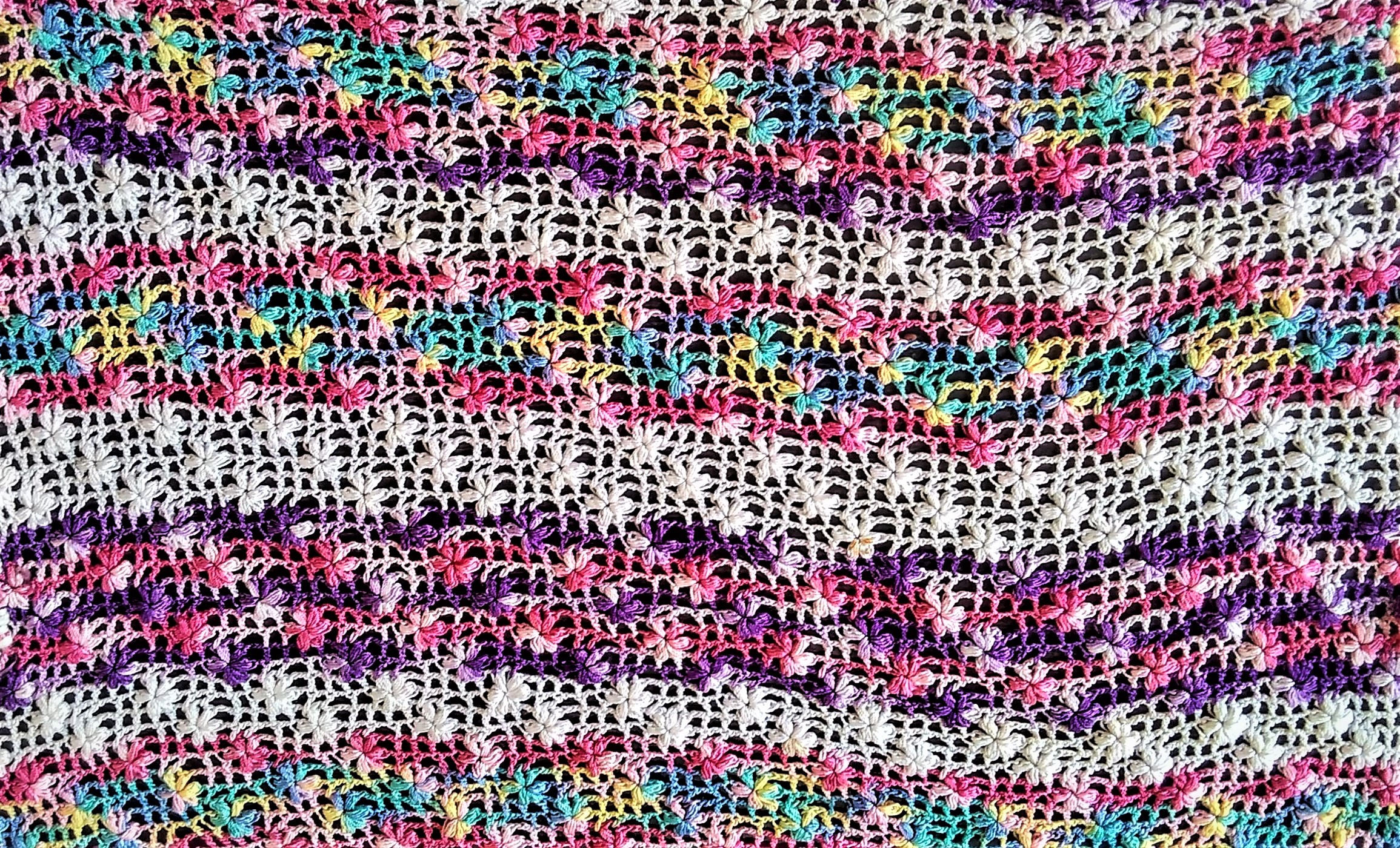
Crochet tablecloth, Kolkata, West Bengal, India

Crocheted fabric is begun by placing a slip-knot loop on the hook (though other methods, such as a magic ring or simple folding over of the yarn, may be used), pulling another loop through the first loop, and repeating this process to create a chain of a suitable length. The chain is either turned and worked in rows, or joined to the beginning of the row with a slip stitch and worked in rounds. Rounds can also be created by working many stitches into a single loop. Stitches are made by pulling one or more loops through each loop of the chain. At any one time at the end of a stitch, there is only one loop left on the hook. Tunisian crochet, however, draws all of the loops for an entire row onto a long hook before working them off one at a time. Like knitting, crochet can be worked either flat (back and forth in rows) or in the round (in spirals, such as when making tubular pieces).

Micro crochet, filet crochet, Tunisian crochet, tapestry crochet, broomstick lace, hairpin lace, cro-hooking, and Irish crochet lace are all variants of the basic crochet method.

== Types of stitches ==
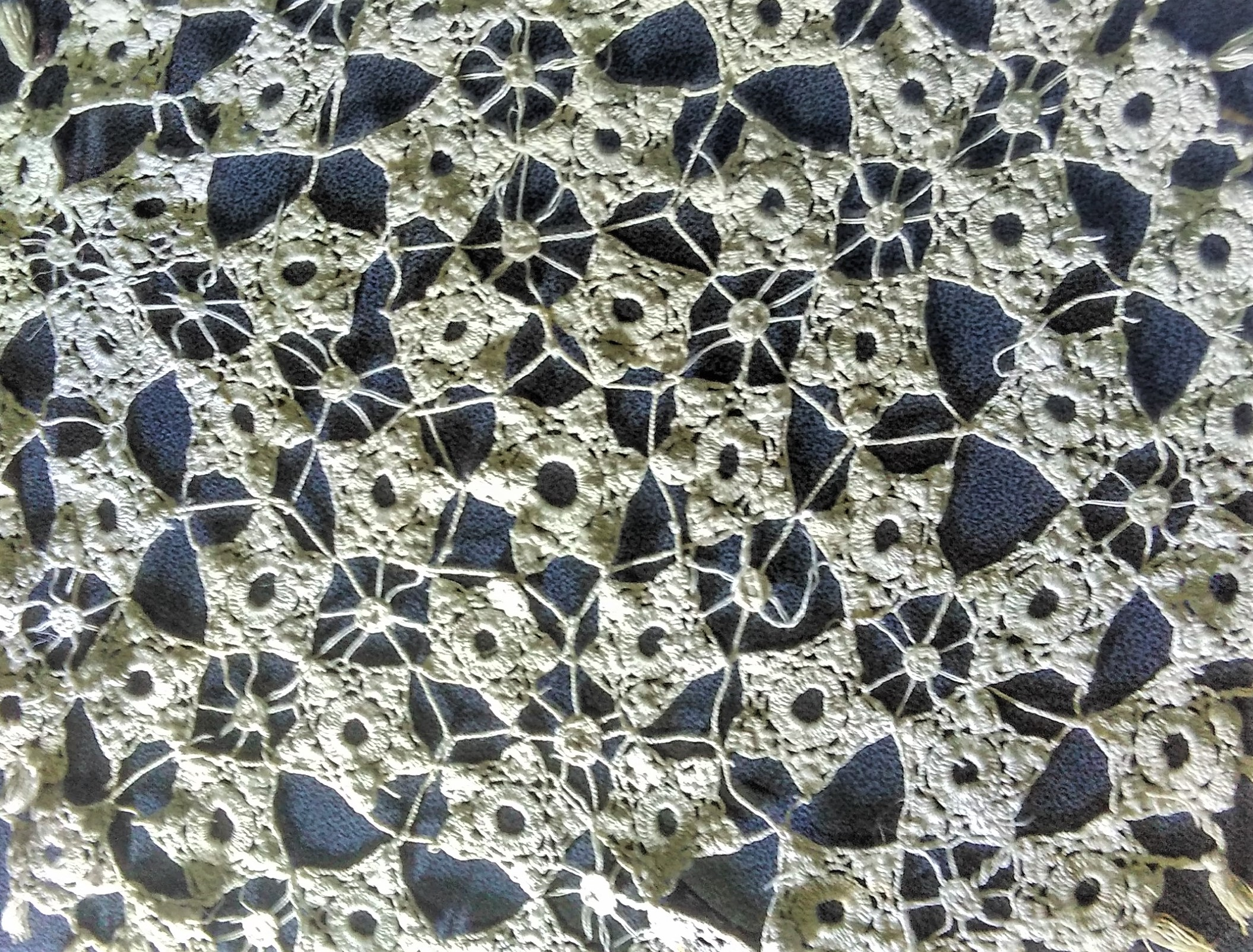
Indian crochet white tablecloth about 1970

There are six main types of basic stitches (the following description uses international crochet terminology with US variants noted in brackets).

1. Chain stitch (ch) – the most basic of all stitches and used to begin most projects. Yarn round hook (yrh) and draw through.
2. Slip stitch (sl st or ss) – used to join chain stitch to form a ring. Insert hook in work, yrh, draw through.
3. Double crochet (dc) (US = single crochet) – Insert hook, draw loop through, (2 loops on hook, hence double), yrh, draw through.
4. Half treble (htr) (US = half double) – yrh, insert hook, draw loop through, (3 loops on hook, hence treble), yrh, draw through all loops.
5. Treble (tr) (US = double) – yrh, insert hook, draw loop through (3 loops on hook, hence treble), yrh, draw through 2 loops, yrh, draw through 2 loops.
6. Double treble (US = treble or triple) – as treble but 2 yrh at start (hence double treble). Also triple treble (ttr), as treble but with 3 yrh at start, and so on.

== Some special types of stitches ==
1. Bamboo stitch (bs)- The stitch is made by chaining three. pull a loop through the third stitch from the hook. pull through the first loop, make a loop in the same stitch as last step and pull though all.
2. Fishnet stitch or mesh stitch (Fs)/(Ms)- The stitch is made by making and treble crochet ( Us-double crochet) and pulling through two of the loops then chaining three and treble crochet into the stitch three away from the original Treble crochet.

While the horizontal distance covered by these basic stitches is the same, they differ in height and can be replaced with a length of ch when required, e.g. 1 tr = 3 ch.

The more advanced stitches are often combinations of these basic stitches, or are made by inserting the hook into the work in unusual locations. More advanced stitches include the shell stitch, V stitch, spike stitch, Afghan stitch, butterfly stitch, popcorn stitch, cluster stitch, and crocodile stitch.

== International crochet terms and notations ==
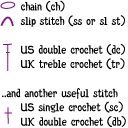
Some crochet symbols, abbreviations, and US/international terms

There are two main notations of basic stitches, one used across Europe, Australia, India and other crocheting nations, the other in the US and Canada. (In America, international terminology is often erroneously called British or UK terminology.) Crochet is traditionally worked from a written pattern using standard abbreviations or from a diagram, thus enabling non-English speakers to use English-based patterns. To help counter confusion when reading patterns, a diagramming system using a standard international notation has come into use (illustration, left). In the United States, crochet terminology and sizing guidelines, as well as standards for yarn and hook labeling, are primarily regulated by the Craft Yarn Council.

Common Crochet Stitches
International term	US term
Double crochet (dc)	Single crochet (sc)
Half treble (htr)	Half double crochet (hdc)
Treble (tr)	Double crochet (dc)
Double treble (dtr)	Triple crochet (tr)
Double crochet 2 together (dc2tog)	Single 2 together (sc2tog)
Treble 2 together (tr2tog)	Double 2 together (dc2tog)

Another terminological difference is known as tension (international) and gauge (US). Individual crocheters work yarn with a loose or a tight hold and, if unmeasured, these differences can lead to significant size changes in finished garments that have the same number of stitches. In order to control for this inconsistency, printed crochet instructions include a standard for the number of stitches across a standard swatch of fabric. An individual crocheter begins work by producing a test swatch and compensating for any discrepancy by changing to a smaller or larger hook.

== Differences and similarities to knitting ==
One of the more obvious differences is that crochet uses one hook while most knitting uses two needles. In most crochet, the artisan usually has only one live stitch on the hook (except Tunisian crochet), while a knitter keeps an entire row of stitches active simultaneously. Dropped stitches, which can unravel a knitted fabric, rarely interfere with crochet work, due to a second structural difference between knitting and crochet. In knitting, each stitch is supported by the corresponding stitch in the row above and it supports the corresponding stitch in the row below. In contrast, crochet stitches are only supported by and support the stitches on either side of it. If a stitch in a finished crocheted item breaks, the stitches above and below remain intact, and because of the complex looping of each stitch, the stitches on either side are unlikely to come loose unless heavily stressed Round or cylindrical patterns are simple to produce with a regular crochet hook, but cylindrical knitting requires either a set of circular needles or three to five special double-ended needles.

Freeform crochet is a technique that can create interesting shapes in three dimensions because new stitches can be made independently of previous stitches almost anywhere in the crocheted piece. It is generally accomplished by building shapes or structural elements onto existing crocheted fabric at any place the crafter desires.

Knitting can be accomplished by machine, while many crochet stitches can only be crafted by hand. The height of knitted and crocheted stitches is also different: a single crochet stitch is twice the height of a knit stitch in the same yarn size and comparable diameter tools, and a double crochet stitch is about four times the height of a knit stitch.

While most crochet is made with a hook, there is also a method of crocheting with a knitting loom. This is called loomchet. Slip stitch crochet is very similar to knitting. Each stitch in slip stitch crochet is formed the same way as a knit or purl stitch which is then bound off. A person working in slip stitch crochet can follow a knitted pattern with knits, purls, and cables, and get a similar result.

It is a common perception that crochet produces a thicker fabric than knitting, tends to have less "give" than knitted fabric, and uses approximately a third more yarn for a comparable project than knitted items. Although this is true when comparing a single crochet swatch with a stockinette swatch, both made with the same size yarn and needle/hook, it is not necessarily true for crochet in general. Most crochet uses far less than 1/3 more yarn than knitting for comparable pieces, and a crocheter can get similar feel and drape to knitting by using a larger hook or thinner yarn. According to sources claiming to have tested the 1/3 more yarn assertion, a single crochet stitch (sc) uses approximately the same amount of yarn as knit garter stitch, but more yarn than stockinette stitch. Any stitch using yarnovers uses less yarn than single crochet to produce the same amount of fabric. Stitches which are in fact multiple stitches worked together, such as cluster stitches, bobble stitches, and puff stitches, will use the most length.

Standard crochet stitches like sc and dc also produce a thicker fabric, more like knit garter stitch. This is part of why they use more yarn. Slip stitch can produce a fabric much like stockinette that is thinner and therefore uses less yarn.

Any yarn can be either knitted or crocheted, provided needles or hooks of the correct size are used, but the cord's properties should be taken into account. For example, lofty, thick woolen yarns tend to function better when knitted, which does not crush their airy structure, while thin and tightly spun yarn helps to achieve the firm texture required for Amigurumi crochet.

Differences between crochet and knitting

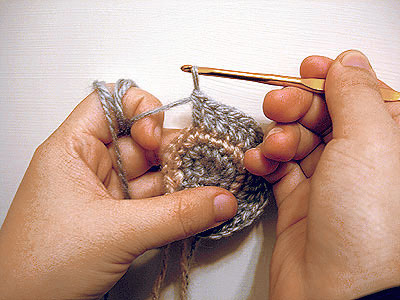
Most crochet uses one hook and works upon one stitch at a time. Crochet may be worked in circular rounds without any specialized tools, as shown here.

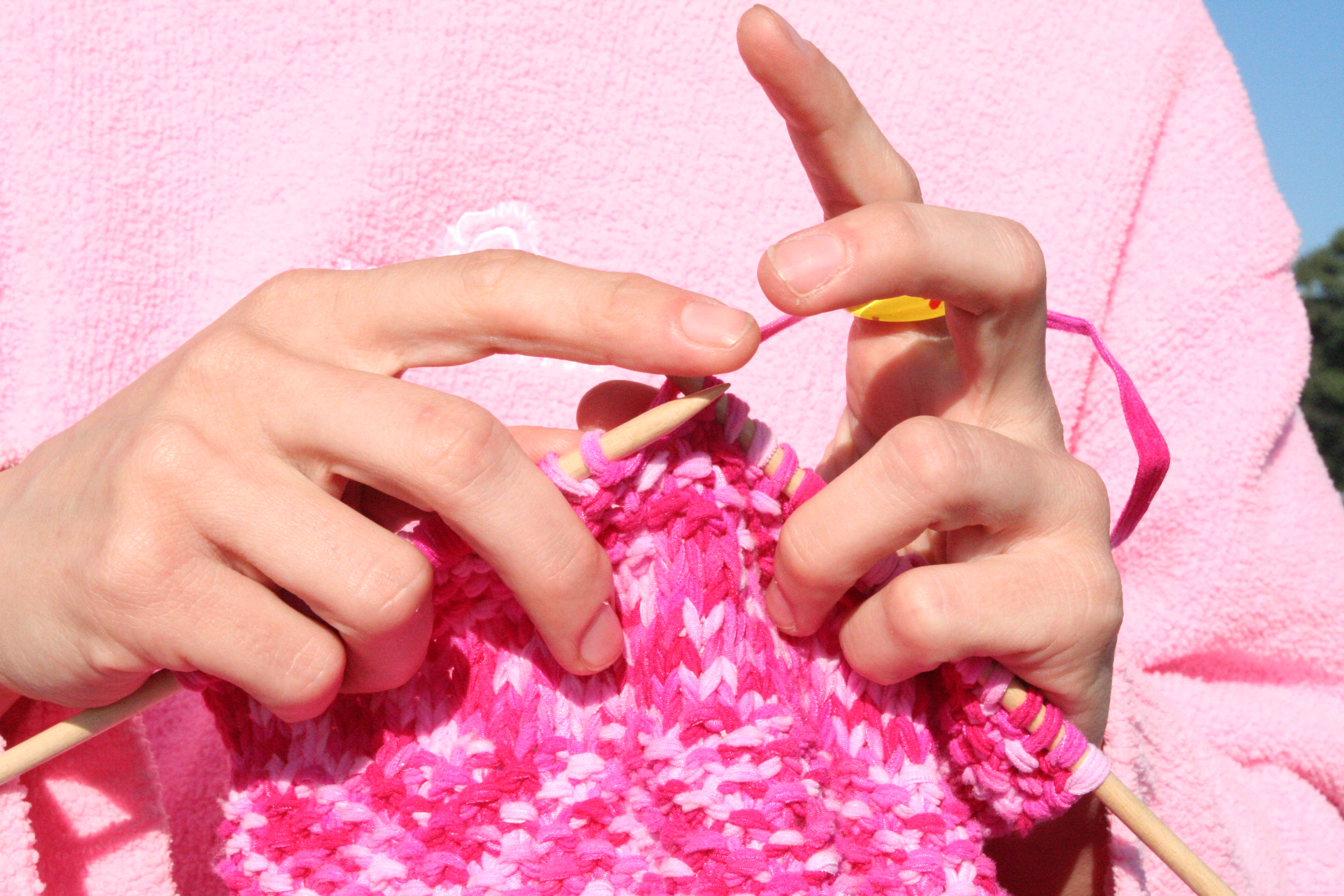
Knitting uses two or more straight needles that carry multiple stitches.

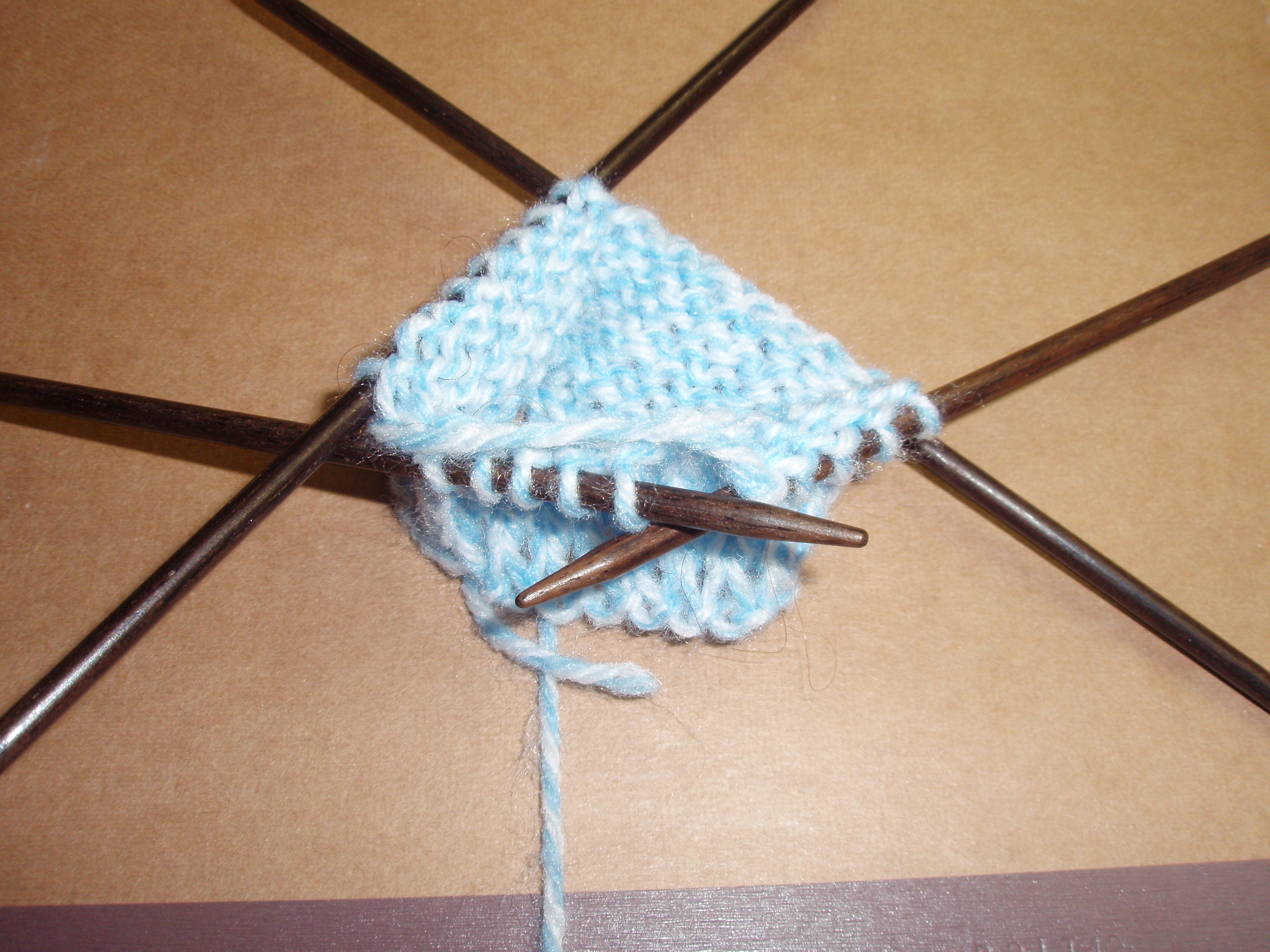
Unlike crochet, knitting requires specialized needles to create circular rounds.

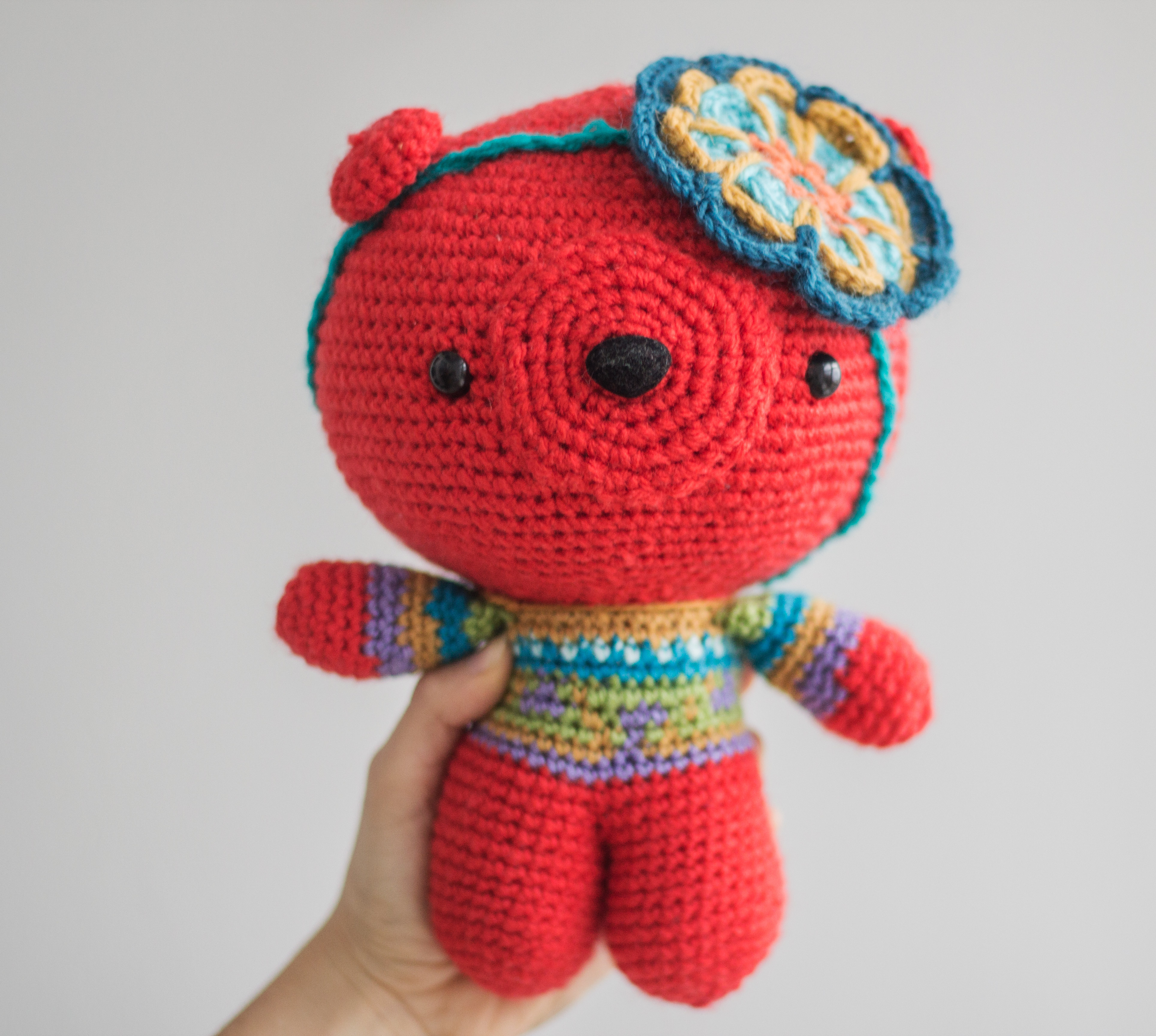
For amigurumi, crocheting creates a knobbier and more structured texture compared with knitting.

== Craftivism ==
It has been very common for people and groups to crochet clothing and other garments and then donate them to soldiers during war. People have also crocheted clothing and then donated it to hospitals, for sick patients and also for newborn babies. Sometimes groups will crochet for a specific charity purpose, such as crocheting for homeless shelters, nursing homes, etc.

It is becoming increasingly popular to crochet hats (commonly referred to as "chemo caps") and donate them to cancer treatment centers, for those undergoing chemotherapy and therefore losing hair. During October pink hats and scarves are made and proceeds are donated to breast cancer funds. Organizations dedicated to using crochet as a way to help others include Knots of Love, Crochet for Cancer, and Soldiers' Angels.

In 2020, people around the world banded together to help save the wildlife affected by the Australian bushfires by crocheting kangaroo pouches, koala mittens, and wildlife nests. This was an international effort to help during the particularly bad bushfire season which devastated local ecological systems.

A group started in 2005 to create crochet versions of coral reefs grew by 2022 to over 20,000 contributors in what became the Crochet Coral Reef Project. To promote awareness of the effects of global warming, their creations have been displayed in galleries and museums, and have been seen by an estimated 2 million people. Many creations apply hyperbolic (curved) geometric shapes—distinguished from Euclidean (flat) geometry—to emulate natural structures. Extending hyperbolic crochet for activism and education with color, a group of South African crafters created The Abundance Crochet Coral Reef, an eco-art installation in Cape Town's Two Oceans Aquarium, to juxtapose hyperbolic shapes crocheted in variations of white on one side of a display with fiber coral shapes crocheted in various colors to illustrate coral bleaching due to oceanic warming and climate change.

Feminist scholar-activists have argued for crochet as an embodied method of inquiry aimed at uncovering entangled, relational, and situated ways being and knowing inclusive of the more-than-human co-creation of worlds. In Staying with the Trouble, Donna Haraway argues for the methodological use of crochet to model ecological and mathematical phenomena as "a kind of lure to an affective cognitive ecology stitched in fiber arts" that works "not by mimicry, but by open-ended, exploratory process."

== Yarn bombing ==
In recent years, a practice called yarn bombing, or the use of knitted or crocheted cloth to modify and beautify one's (usually outdoor) surroundings, emerged in the US and spread worldwide. Yarn bombers sometimes target existing pieces of graffiti for beautification. In 2010, an entity dubbed "the Midnight Knitter" hit West Cape May. Residents awoke to find knit cozies hugging tree branches and sign poles. In September 2015, Grace Brett was named "The World's Oldest Yarn Bomber". She is part of a group of yarn graffiti-artists called the Souter Stormers, who beautify their local town in Scotland. In 2006, protesters in Denmark, the United Kingdom and the United States yarnbombed a World War II combat tank with four thousand pink knitted squares.

== Mathematics and hyperbolic crochet ==
Crochet has been used to illustrate shapes in hyperbolic space that are difficult to reproduce using other media or are difficult to understand when viewed two-dimensionally. Mathematician Daina Taimiņa first used crochet in 1997 to create strong, durable models of hyperbolic space after finding paper models were delicate and hard to create. These models enable one to turn, fold, and otherwise manipulate space to more fully grasp certain ideas, such as how a straight line can appear curved in hyperbolic space. Her work received an exhibition by the Institute For Figuring.

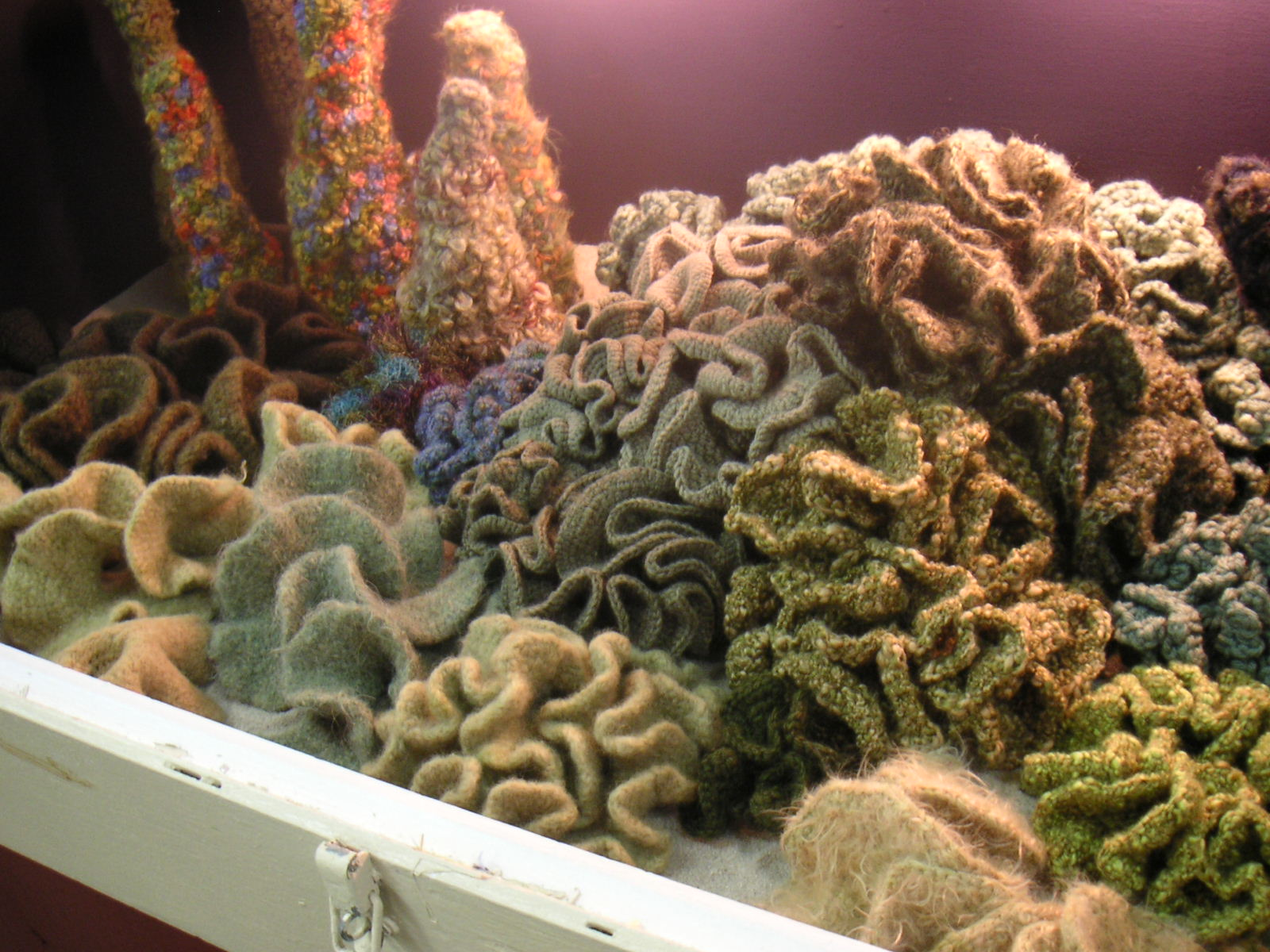
A collection of crocheted hyperbolic planes, in imitation of a coral reef

Examples in nature of organisms that show hyperbolic structures include lettuces, sea slugs, flatworms and coral. Margaret Wertheim and Christine Wertheim of the Institute For Figuring created a traveling art installation of a coral reef using Taimina's method. Local artists are encouraged to create their own "satellite reefs" to be included alongside the original display. As hyperbolic and mathematics-based crochet has become more popular, there have been several events highlighting work from various fiber artists. Two shows were Sant Ocean Hall at the Smithsonian in Washington, D.C., and Sticks, Hooks, and the Mobius: Knit and Crochet Go Cerebral at Lafayette College in Pennsylvania.

== Architecture ==
In Style in the technical arts, Gottfried Semper looks at the textile with great promise and historical precedent. In Section 53, he writes of the "loop stitch, or Noeud Coulant: a knot that, if untied, causes the whole system to unravel." In the same section, Semper confesses his ignorance of the subject of crochet but believes strongly that it is a technique of great value as a textile technique and possibly something more.

There are a small number of architects currently interested in the subject of crochet as it relates to architecture. The following publications, explorations and thesis projects can be used as a resource to see how crochet is being used within the capacity of architecture.

- Emergent Explorations: Analog and Digital Scripting – Alexander Worden
- Research and Design: The Architecture of Variation – Lars Spuybroek
- YurtAlert – Kate Pokorny

== Styles in crochet ==
- Mosaic crochet
- Granny square
- Freeform crochet
- Motifs
- Crocheted lace
- Tunisian crochet
- Tapestry crochet
- Amigurumi
- Filet crochet
- Corner to Corner (C2C) Crochet
- Irish crochet lace
- Bead crochet
- Doily

== See also ==
- List of crochet stitches
- Crochet Guild of America
- The Tempestry Project
- Fiber art
- Macramé
- Tatting
- Knitting
- Sewing
- Embroidery
