= Freeform =

Freeform or free-form may refer to:

- Electron-beam freeform fabrication, an additive manufacturing process that builds near-net-shape parts
- Free-form radio, a radio station programming format in which the disc jockey is given either total or wide control over what music to play
- Freeform (Apple), a digital whiteboarding application developed by Apple
- Freeform (TV channel), an American basic cable channel owned and operated by ABC Family Worldwide
- Freeform crochet and knitting, a seemingly random combination of crochet, knitting and in some cases other fibre arts
- Freeform Five, an English electronic group
- Freeform role-playing game, a type of role-playing game which employ informal or simplified rule sets
- Freeform surface modelling, a technique for engineering freeform surfaces with a CAD or CAID system
- KFFP-LP (also Freeform Portland), a low-power listener supported community radio station in Portland, Oregon

== See also ==
- Free form (disambiguation)
