= Crochet Guild of America =

Crochet advocacy nonprofit organization

- Abbreviation: CGOA
- Formation: 1994; 32 years ago
- Founder: Gwen Blakley Kinsler
- Type: Nonprofit
- Headquarters: Morton Grove, Illinois, United States
- Fields: Crochet advocacy
- Members: 2,674 (2009)
- Website: https://www.crochet.org/

The Crochet Guild of America (CGOA) is an association to encourage crocheting, based in Morton Grove, Illinois, United States. It was founded by Gwen Blakley Kinsler in 1994 and had roughly 2,500 members as of December, 2017 in the United States and abroad.

The guild's purpose is to "educate the public about crochet, provide education and networking opportunities, and set a national standard for the quality, art and skill of crochet through creative endeavors."

As of 2010 there were more than 3,000 members, plus over 80 local chapters and two online chapters affiliated with the Crochet Guild of America. Members interact through the CGOA blog and at annual CGOA conferences - called Chain Link events.

== CGOA's 20th Anniversary ==
CGOA 20th anniversary logo

In 2014, the CGOA celebrated its 20th anniversary. The theme was Proud Past, Brilliant Future

A committee made up of Past Guild Presidents was created to plan the organization's 20th anniversary. The logo was designed by CGOA member Donna Wolfe.
