= Free form =

Free form may refer to:

- A free morpheme as opposed to a bound morpheme or bound form in linguistic morphology
- Free-form composition
- Free form jazz
- Free form fabrication in 3D printing
- Free-form language
- Free form poetry
- Free-form radio, programming format in which the disc jockey is given total control over what music to play
- Free-form (video game gameplay)

== Music ==
- Free Form (Donald Byrd album)
- Free Form (Joe Harriott album)
- "Free Form Guitar", track from Chicago Transit Authority (album)

== See also ==
- Freeform (disambiguation)
