= Freeform crochet and knitting =

Freeform crochet and knitting is a seemingly random combination of crochet, knitting and in some cases other fibre arts to make a piece that is not constrained by patterns, colours, stitches or other limitations.

The roots of this art are thought to be in Irish crochet, whose own identity came to the fore in the 1960s and 1970s. The late 20th and early 21st centuries have seen a revival and progression of this form of textile expression. Well known freeformers include Penny O'Neill, James Walters, Sylvia Cosh, Jenny Dowde, Jan Messent, Margaret Hubert, Myra Wood, Hannah Martin, and Prudence Mapstone.

One feature of this freeform art is that group pieces can be made by people of varying expertise and experience. Leftover and scrap yarn can be made into scrumbles that can later be joined together. The name 'scrumbles' was coined by James Walter and Sylvia Cosh during the 1990s and has remained the term since. However Jenny Dowde in her books Freeform Knitting & Crochet, Freeformations and Surface Work has coined her own terminology for the "scrumbling" as "fragments"; while Prudence Mapstone calls what are known to others as "scrumbles" "patches".

Yarn bombing is the related display of knitted pieces as non-permanent graffiti.
