= Knots of Love =

American nonprofit organization

- Formation: 2007
- Type: Non-profit
- Headquarters: Ashland, Wisconsin
- Website: www.knotsoflove.org

Knots of Love is a 501(c)(3) non-profit organization based in Ashland, Wisconsin, founded by Christine M. Fabiani which donates hand-knit and crocheted beanies for people going through chemo, as well as hand-knit blankets for babies in the neonatal intensive care units. As of 2015, Knots of Love has donated over 600,000 handmade caps and blankets to patients at cancer treatment centers, infusion centers, hospitals and oncology offices across all 50 states.

Each day, envelopes, bags and boxes containing handmade caps arrive on the doorstep of the Knots of Love HQ in Ashland, Wisconsin. The caps come in from volunteers all over the country. The caps are collected, checked, sorted, logged, tagged, bagged, decorated with a red bow (or with a flag for veterans) boxed, and shipped off to the 590+ cancer treatment centers across the USA. Former President Bill Clinton named Knots of Love his charity of choice in 2009. The following year, the organization exceeded a 2,000 percent growth since its inception.

In October 2012, Sears launched a Knots of Love jewelry line. Sevenly, a social good apparel company, designed t-shirts and sweatshirts for Knots of Love in December 2012. A portion of the proceeds were donated to the organization. In August 2013, the organization’s volunteers yarn bombed the LAB Antimall in Costa Mesa, California. The volunteers covered the shopping center’s trees, trunks and flower pots with colorful yarn to promote Knots of Love’s campaign to send 8,000 caps to Veteran Affairs hospitals in the United States. A group of Google employees donated 101 caps to the organization that month. Additionally, Knots of Love held a knit cap drive at the Angel Stadium of Anaheim.

The organization donated its 300,000th handmade cap in June 2016, after having reached its previous milestone of 200,000th caps donated in May 2014. In February 2015, a Newport Beach hair salon donated haircuts to raise $5,000 for Knots of Love.

== Operations ==
Knots of Love is a 100 percent donation-based nonprofit organization. By July 2016, the organization had donated over 538,000 caps to approximately 588 hospitals. Knots of Love donates more than 4,000 caps per month to over 588 cancer treatment centers, infusion centers, hospitals and oncology offices in all 50 states, Mexico, Canada and Ireland.
