= Hairpin lace =

Lace-making technique

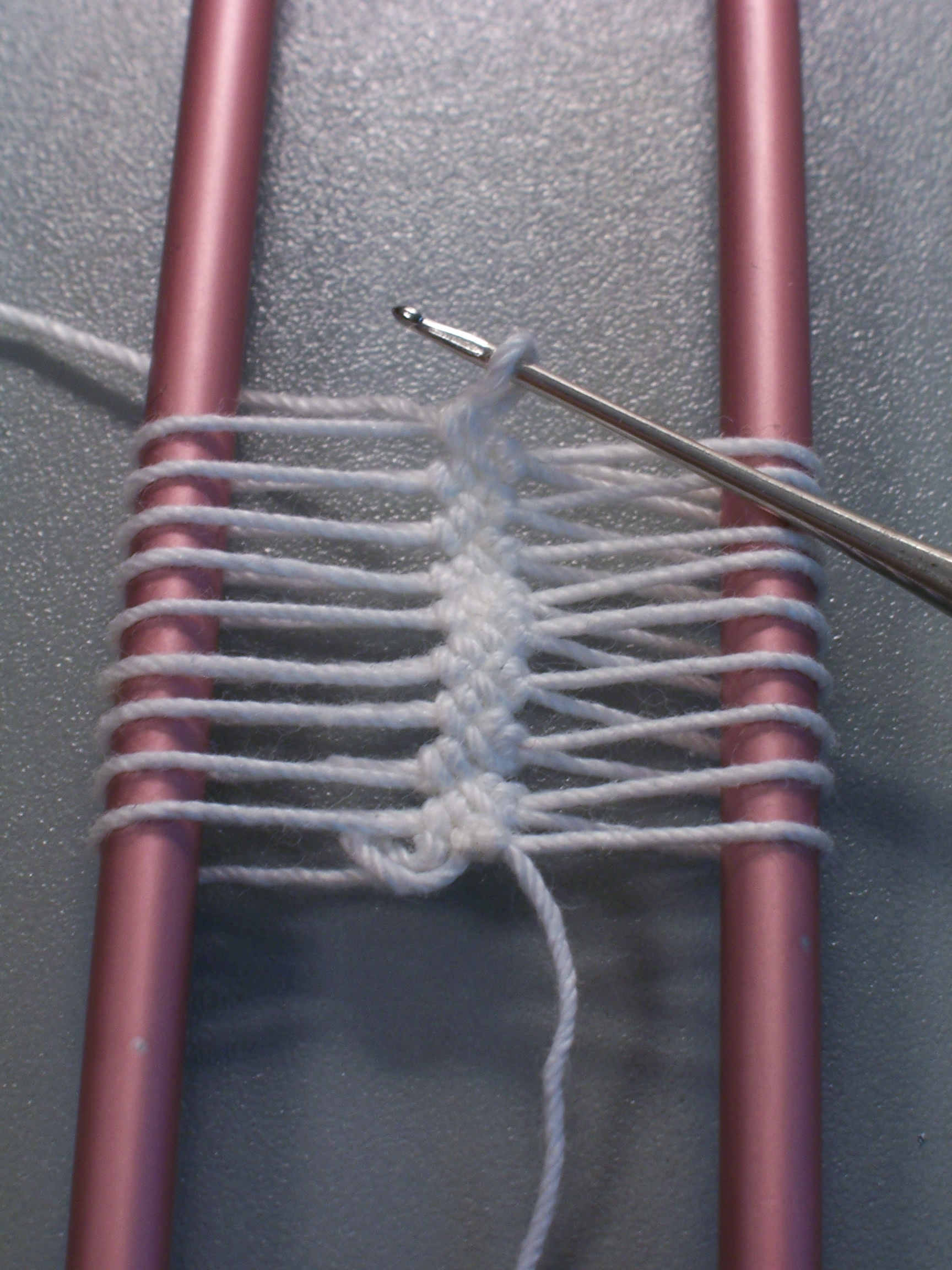
Hairpin lace on frame

Hairpin lace is a lace-making technique that uses a crochet hook and two parallel metal rods held at the top and the bottom by removable bars. Historically, a metal U-shaped eponymous hairpin was used.

Hairpin lace is formed by wrapping yarn around the prongs of the hairpin lace loom to form loops, which are held together by a row of crochet stitches worked in the center, called the spine. The resulting piece of lace can be worked to any length desired by removing the bottom bar of the hairpin and slipping the loops off the end. The strips produced by this process can be joined together to create an airy and lightweight fabric.

Various types of yarns and threads can be used to achieve different color, texture and design effects. Examples of items made with hairpin lace include scarves, shawls, hats, baby blankets, afghans, and clothing. Hairpin lace can also be added to sewn, knitted, and crocheted works as a decorative accent.
