= Crochet hook =

Implement with a hook at one end, used in crocheting

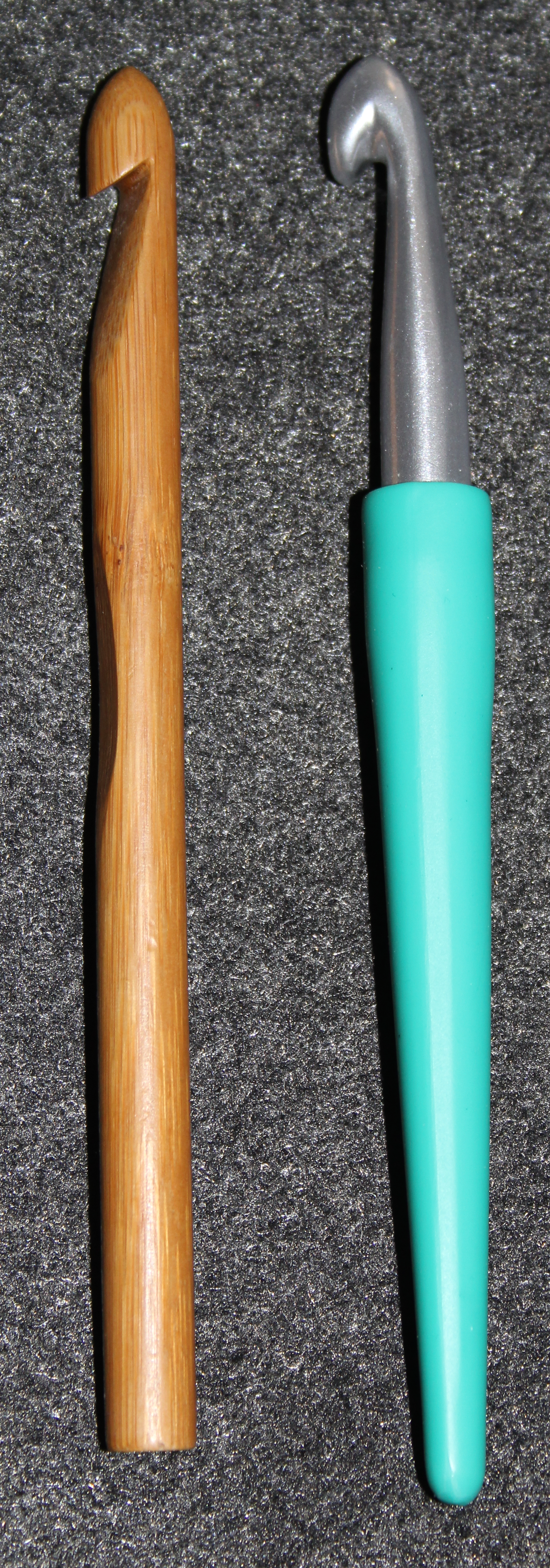
Crochet hooks

A crochet hook is a tool used to create loops in thread or yarn and to interlock them into crochet stitches. It consists of a round shaft with a hooked tip, with a lateral groove behind it. The point eases the insertion of the hook through the material being crocheted and the groove makes it possible to pull a loop back through the material. The shaft includes a working area that determines the hook's nominal diameter and helps maintain consistent loop size, and a handle designed for grip and control.

== Construction ==
Crochet emerged as a distinct textile art during the early 19th century, and many crochet hooks survive from that period. These early tools generally fall into two categories: thin steel hooks inserted into separate handles and single-piece hooks made from materials such as bone, wood, or metal. Although the distinction between steel and non-steel hooks persists, most modern hooks are manufactured as single pieces. A variety of coverings may be applied to the handle for ergonomic reasons. Ornate handles have also been added throughout time, with one method being scrimshaw during 19th century Europe.

Crochet hooks are currently produced in diameters ranging from 0.35 mm to 25 mm. These diameters are indicated both directly in millimeters and by various numerical or literal gauge systems. Hooks under 2.0 mm are made of steel (for its strength) and are alternately termed steel-, lace- or thread hooks. Hooks of 2.00 mm or larger diameter are called yarn hooks or regular hooks. Aluminum is widely used between 2.0 mm and 6.0 mm because of its balance between strength and weight, while larger hooks are often made from bamboo, wood, or plastic. The indicated size boundaries between the types are, however, approximate. With the exception of the thinnest hooks, which are invariably made of steel, other materials may be encountered outside the indicated ranges.

Historical materials for handles and some one-piece hooks include bone, porcupine quill, celluloid, agate, ivory, and fossilized mammoth ivory.

Longer hooks are used in Tunisian crochet to hold multiple live loops simultaneously. A form with hooks at both ends is also used for Tunisian and other types of crochet that cannot be made with the standard hook, such as cro-hooking.

== History ==
While the exact origins of crochet are unknown, there is evident influence from similar crafts from the 18th century. Shepherd's knitting was popular in Europe in the late 1700 - early 1800s and used a flat hook to create what is now known as slip stitches. Tambour embroidery is thought to have originated in China, being later brought to Europe through trade. This practice used a hooked needle and was used to produce chain stitches. With time, hooks resembling what is often used today were created and featured a smoother taper and circular cross section. Prior to the advent of industrialization, crochet hooks were made by hand from locally accessible materials. From the examples that have been preserved from the 19th century, it can be noted that the crochet hooks vary with regard to the form, size (in terms of length and diameter), and the manner in which the handles were made. This can be attributed both to the regional practices that were followed at that time, as well as the absence of proper procedures for making crochet hooks.

== United States standard crochet hook and knitting needle sizes ==
Accurate knitting needle and crochet hook sizing is important for both crafts. There are, however, no uniform procedures for indicating these measurements.

The Craft Yarn Council of America (CYCA), an industry trade association, has collated a table of crochet hook and knitting needle sizes from de facto industrial standards and elicited the cooperation of its member organizations in adopting them to regularize sizing in the United States. The listed gauge systems are also widely used internationally. Their broader applicability is further highlighted by their normalization with the metric system, which the CYCA members have agreed to have appear prominently on their packaging.

A hook gauge is used for measuring both knitting needles and crochet hooks. The size of a crochet hook is determined by the diameter of its shaft. Before the establishment of modern standardization, there was no consistency in the labeling of the sizes of hooks amongst different manufacturers. This made it difficult to replicate the patterns. The work of these organizations during the 20th century ensured the uniformity of the sizes of hooks by matching them with the metric measurement system.

Standard sizes are:

Metric diameter	US Knitting Needle Number	Corresponding Crochet Hook Size
2.25 mm	1	B-1
2.75 mm	2	C-2
3.25 mm	3	D-3
3.5 mm	4	E-4
3.75 mm	5	F-5
4 (or 4.25 mm for crochet, depending on the brand)	6	G-6
4.5 mm	7	7
5 mm	8	H-8
5.5 mm	9	I-9
6 mm	10	J-10
6.5 mm	10.5	K-10.5
8 mm	11	L-11
9 mm	13	M/N-13
10 mm	15	N/P-15
12.75 mm	17	—
15 mm	19	P/Q
16 mm	—	Q
19 mm	35	S
25 mm	50	T/U/X

== Types ==
A Knook is a type of crochet hook whose one end is a crochet hook and the other end has an eye-hole for attaching a cord. The cord allows for multiple stitches to be held like knitting needles while forming knit-style structures with a hook.

== Use ==
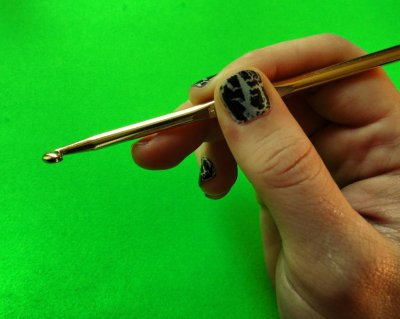
An example of someone holding a crochet hook

The two basic ways of holding a crochet hook are:

- the pencil grip, with the hook going over the crotch of the thumb, resembling a pencil,
- the knife grip, with the hook under the palm of the hand, resembling a knife held when held overhand.

These grips are functionally equivalent and selected as a matter of personal preference, with hybrid forms being commonplace.

== Adaptive crochet hooks ==
Adaptive crochet hooks are specialized crochet hooks intended to assist individuals with physical disabilities. Most adaptive hooks are designed with an ergonomic handle that provide a comfortable grip and reduces strain on the individual's fingers, wrists, and hands. Many include ergonomic handles that reduce strain on the fingers, wrists, and hands, making them helpful for people with arthritis or carpal tunnel syndrome.

In addition to ergonomic handles, adaptive hooks may involve other features including enlarged hooks or longer handles, to provide better control and ease of use for individual with limited mobility or dexterity. The increase of accessibility to different styles of hooks has made it possible to sustain a longevity for an individual's ability to crochet.

There have also been other aid devices that can be bought or made that allow for one-handed crocheting. In many cases, these tools help regulate the tension of the yarn or secure the hook in place. This is particularly beneficial for individuals who are amputees, lack function in one hand, have temporary or long-term injuries, dexterity issues, etc.

== Other applications ==
Crochet hooks are useful beyond fiber arts wherever a small hook is needed to pull material through a small space. For example, many knitters use them to fix dropped knitting stitches, and tailors may use a crochet hook to thread a drawstring through its casing. Their use is not limited to fiber arts; crochet hooks can be used to maintain dreadlocks by pulling stray hairs back into the main dread.

== See also ==
- Buttonhook
- Hook gauge
