= Tunisian crochet =

Type of crochet

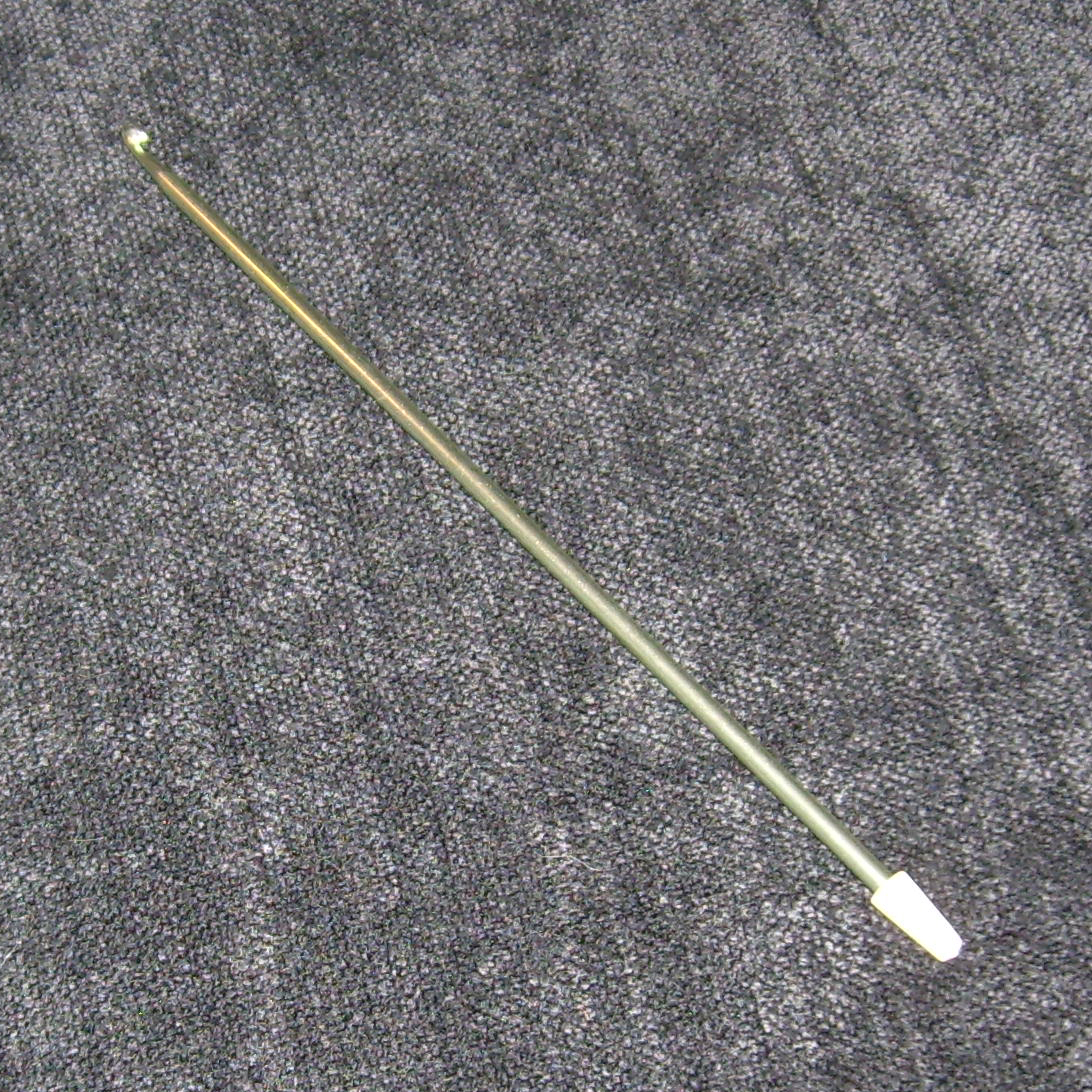
A Tunisian crochet hook

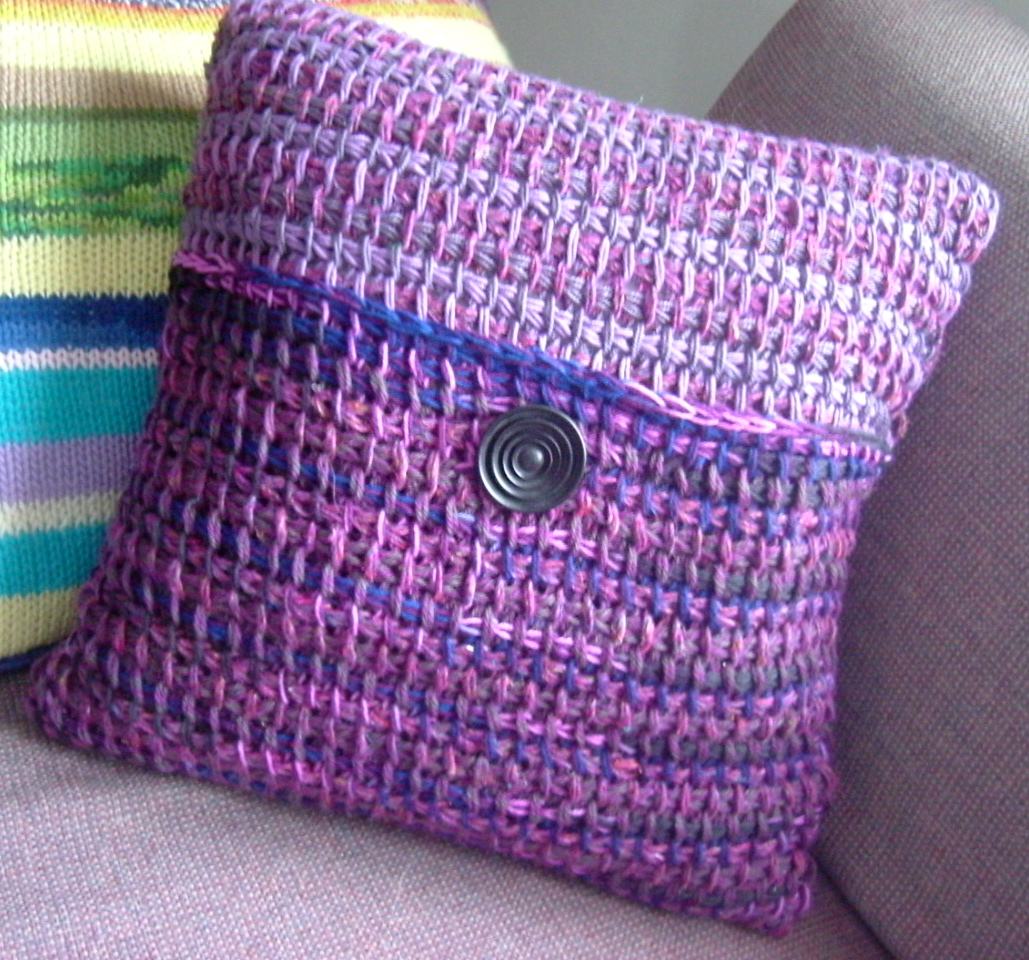
Tunisian crochet pillow

Video of Tunisian simple stitch

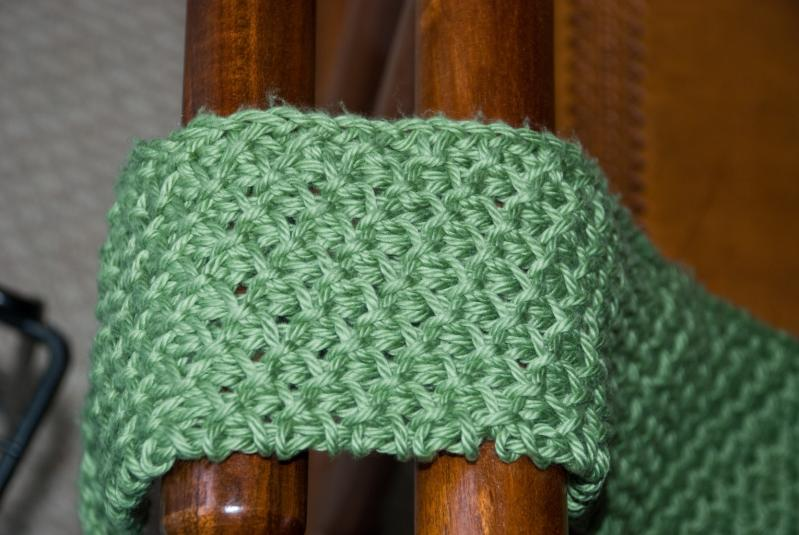
Tunisian crochet smock stitch

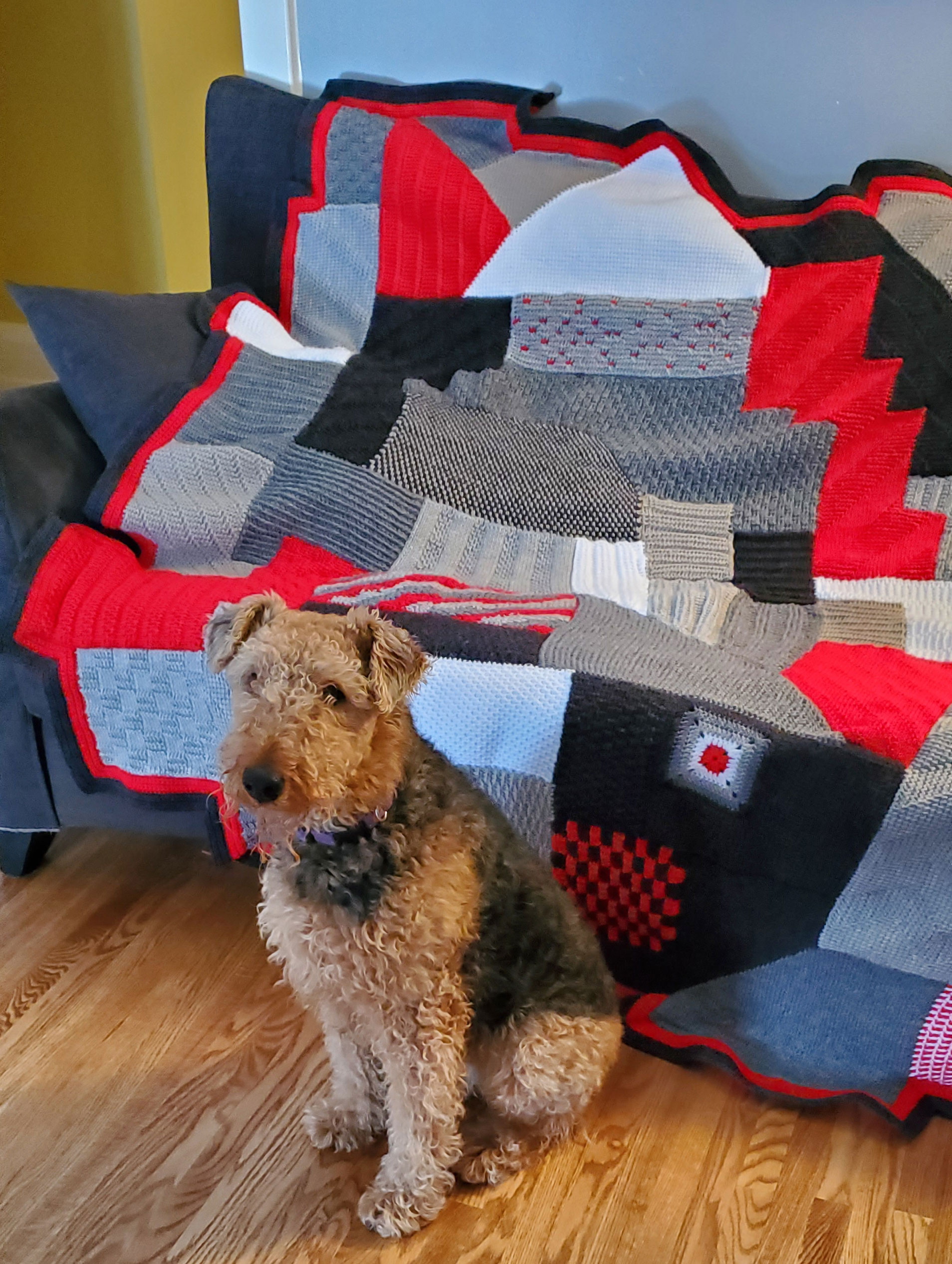
Afghan showcasing Tunisian crochet stitches, stitch combinations and patterns

Tunisian crochet or Afghan crochet is a type of crochet that uses an elongated hook, often with a stopper on the handle end, called an Afghan hook. It is sometimes considered to be a mixture of crocheting and knitting. As such, some techniques used in knitting are also applicable in Tunisian crochet. One example is the intarsia method.

== Description ==
The work is begun with the traditional crochet starting chain, a series of chain stitches. Once the chain is completed, the first row is worked by inserting the hook back into the previous link of the chain, and a loop from the free end of the yarn is grabbed with the hook and pulled back through the link. Unlike traditional crochet, however, this new loop is not then pulled through the initial loop. Both remain on the hook and then the process is repeated, working from right to left if the artisan is right-handed, until each link in the chain has been worked. At the end, there will be as many loops on the hook as there are stitches required. This step is called forward pass, it is similar to casting on in knitting. This is the first of two parts for creating a row.

For the "Tunisian simple stitch" and most basic ones, the work is never turned. Once the correct number of loops is obtained, the process is reversed with each loop being worked off from the hook by pulling a fresh loop of yarn through each stitch, working from left to right, called the reverse or backward pass. It is both parts of the process which form a completed row. The tension of the yarn is much looser than in standard crochet or knitting.

Tunisian crochet can also be worked in the round as when making a seamless cap. To work in the round, a double-ended crochet hook and two balls of yarn are used. The first hook and ball of yarn are used to add loops (casting on). When the process is reversed (as described above), the loops are worked off using the second hook and second ball of yarn. When using a flexible cable to connect the two ends of the double-ended crochet hook, a single ball of yarn is sufficient.

There are a variety of stitches that can be created depending on how and where the hook is inserted and how the working yarn is held. Tunisian stitches include variations on knit, purl, post stitch, and entrelac.

The fabric created by Tunisian crochet is slightly less elastic than normal crochet and substantially thicker, particularly the knit stitch. This makes it most suitable for blankets and winter knits, but unsuitable for finer items like babywear and socks. The fabric also has a tendency to curl, and usually needs to be shaped by wetting or steaming the fabric (known as blocking) upon completion. It is slightly faster to create fabric by Tunisian than normal crochet, and approximately twice the speed of knitting.

== Naming history ==
Tunisian crochet has gone by many names including Afghan crochet, Victorian crochet, tricot stitch, Scotch knitting, Princess Frederick William stitch, Princess Royal Crochet stitch, idiot's crochet, fool's crochet, and shepherd's knitting. The first mention of knitting with Tunisian-style hooked needles appeared in what is now Germany around 1787−1800, then in France in 1817. The first use of Tunisian in relation to this form of crochet was found in 1857 in Sweden (tuniska virkstygn, "Tunisian simple stitch"). The term "Tunisian Crochet" is first found in English in an American publication from 1862.

There is no definite link between Tunisia and the Tunisian crochet; it might have been made because similar crafts are practised in Tunisia, or because Tunisia was situated on the trading route from Egypt to Europe where hooked needles were sold. Another possibility is that the name was given to indicate that this is an "exotic" fiber craft.

== See also ==
- Afghan blanket
