= Lorna Hamilton-Brown =

English artist, researcher, film maker

Lorna Hamilton-Brown MBE
- Education: Royal College of Art
- Known for: textile art
- Website: www.lornahamiltonbrown.com

Lorna Hamilton-Brown MBE is an English artist, researcher, filmmaker and educator who has been called "the Banksy of knitting". Her primary medium is machine knitting. She is an advocate for the recognition of Black people's contributions to the crafts of knitting and crochet and is a member of the BIPOC in Fiber initiative, for which she designed the logo. She is also a member of the Vogue Knitting Diversity Advisory Council.

== Career ==
Hamilton-Brown was taught to knit at the age of five by her mother, who had emigrated to England from Jamaica. She earned a Bachelor of Arts honours degree in digital multimedia at De Montfort University in Leicester in 2002. She was made a Member of the Order of the British Empire in the 2005 New Year Honours "for services to the community in Leicestershire".

Because of her practice of placing her work in non-gallery public places where she hopes to spark responses from viewers she has been called the Banksy of knitting by Lauren O'Farrell, founder of the English graffiti knitting Knit the City collective. An early example was "Out of the Blue", a pair of life-size panels depicting two young people, which she created after the London Riots of 2011, and displayed at the seafront in Hastings.

In 2018 she earned a Master of Arts in Textiles from the Royal College of Art with a thesis entitled Myth: Black People Don't Knit: The Importance of Art and Oral Histories for Documenting the Experiences of Black Knitters. In October 2017 she was Maker in Residence at University College London's Institute of Making.

As part of her MA work at the Royal College of Art Hamilton-Brown made a music video entitled Knitting the Blues about the therapeutic value of knitting for people suffering from anxiety and depression. In it, the protagonist feels better after learning to make "tension birds" based on simple knitted squares. Hamilton-Brown's tension birds were included in Visible Mending, an animated film directed by Samantha Moore for the British Film Institute and featured in The New York Times in 2023.

In 2022 Hamilton-Brown was one of five Black and Asian women artists whose work was featured in We Gather, an exhibition at the Crafts Council Her piece "We Mek", which was commissioned for the exhibition and added to the Crafts Council's collection, is a machine knitted magazine cover. Hamilton-Brown stated that the style of the illustration, which pays homage to Angela Davis, was inspired by the photographs of James Barnor for Drum, a South African magazine.

In October 2022 Hamilton-Brown produced "Playing the Race Card", an exhibition in St Leonards-on-Sea, East Sussex of Black artists' work whose goal was to “replace a culture of victim blaming with a celebration of diversity.”

In 2023 she organized and participated in "We Out Here", an exhibition at the Hastings Contemporary by 6 Black Hastings artists of Caribbean heritage. For the exhibition Hamilton-Brown created a new "We Mek" magazine cover commemorating the 75th anniversary of the arrival in England of people from the Caribbean on board the Empire Windrush.
