= Lauren O'Farrell =

English author and artist, also known as Deadly Knitshade

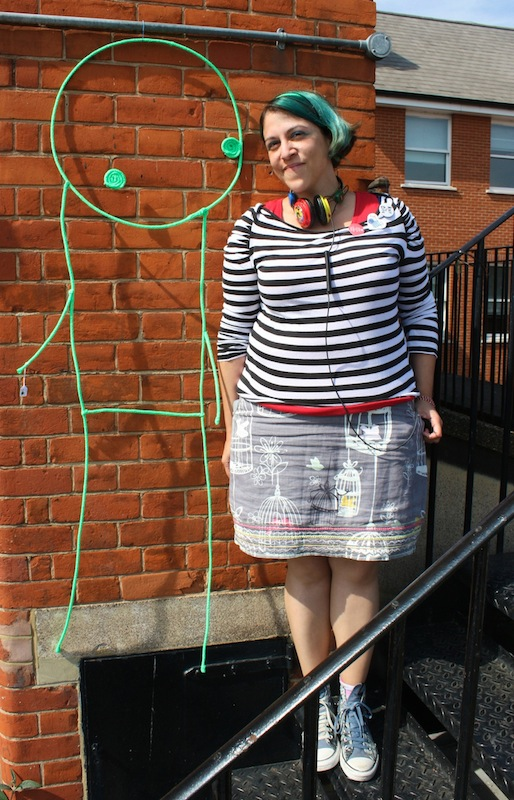
- Lauren O'Farrell
- Born: Cheltenham, Gloucestershire, UK
- Occupations: Author, artist
- Writing career
- Pen name: Deadly Knitshade
- Genres: knitting, craft, street art
- Website: whodunnknit.com

Lauren O'Farrell, (born 1977) also known as Deadly Knitshade, is an English author and artist. She is best known for playing a major part in the beginnings of the UK graffiti knitting street art scene, creating the Stitch London craft community and founding graffiti knitting and craft collective Knit the City.

As a graffiti knitting street artist she is attributed with creating the term 'yarnstorming' as a less violent alternative to the popular yarnbombing in graffiti knitting and the creation of the 'stitched story' style of graffiti knitting using amigurumi and handmade objects to create a themed artwork rather than the traditional cosy.

O'Farrell uses the label Whodunnknit for her work, and lives in London.

== Books ==
- O'Farrell, Lauren (2011) Stitch London: 20 Kooky Ways to Knit the City and More UK: David & Charles
- Knitshade, Deadly (2011) Knit the city: A Whodunnknit Set in London. UK: Summersdale.
- O'Farrell, Lauren (2013) Stitch New York: 20 Kooky Ways to Knit the City and More UK: David & Charles
