= Action art =

Action art may refer to:

- Action painting, a form of abstract expressionism
- Performance art and art intervention
