= Art intervention =

Type of artistic interaction

Art intervention is an interaction with a previously existing artwork, audience, venue/space or situation. It is in the category of conceptual art and is commonly a form of performance art. It is associated with Letterist International, Situationist International, Viennese Actionists, the Dada movement and Neo-Dadaists. More latterly, intervention art has delivered Guerrilla art, street art plus the Stuckists have made extensive use of it to affect perceptions of artworks they oppose and as a protest against existing interventions.

Intervention can also refer to art and actions which enter a situation outside the art world in an attempt to change the existing conditions there. For example, intervention art may attempt to change economic or political situations, or may attempt to make people aware of a condition that they previously had no knowledge of. Since these goals mean that intervention art necessarily addresses and engages with the public, some artists call their work "public interventions".

Although intervention by its nature carries an implication of subversion, it is now accepted as a legitimate form of art, and is often executed with the endorsement of those in positions of authority over the artwork, audience, or venue/space to be intervened in. However, unendorsed (i.e. illicit) interventions are common and lead to debate as to the distinction between art and vandalism. By definition it is a challenge, or at the very least a comment, related to the earlier work or the theme of that work, or to the expectations of a particular audience, and more likely to fulfil that function to its full potential when it is unilateral. Although, in these instances, it is almost certain that it will be viewed by authorities as unwelcome, if not vandalism, and not art.

== Origins ==
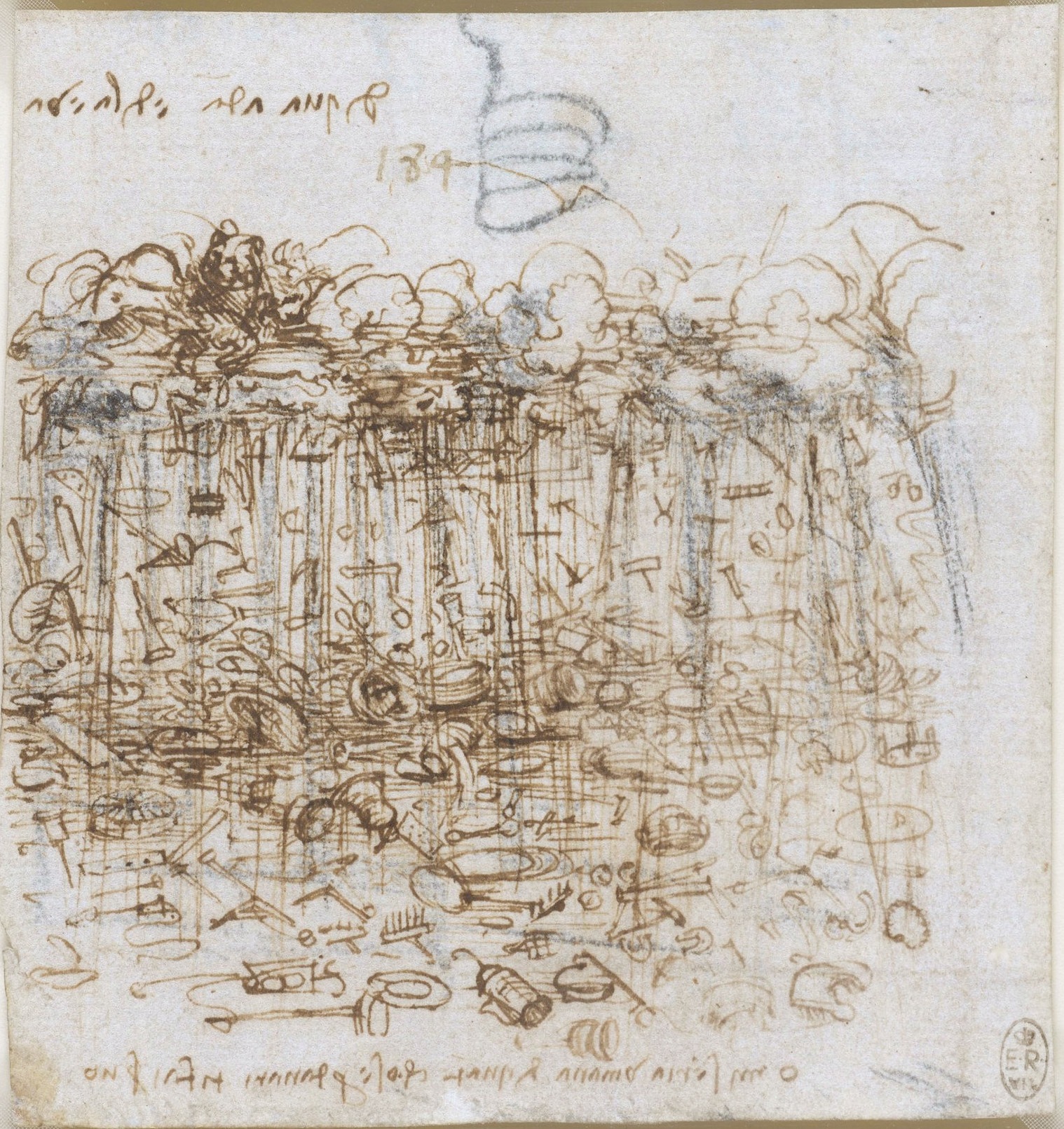
"Cloudburst of material possessions" Leonardo Da Vinci with the inscription – "Oh human misery, how many things you must serve for money" Royal Collection.

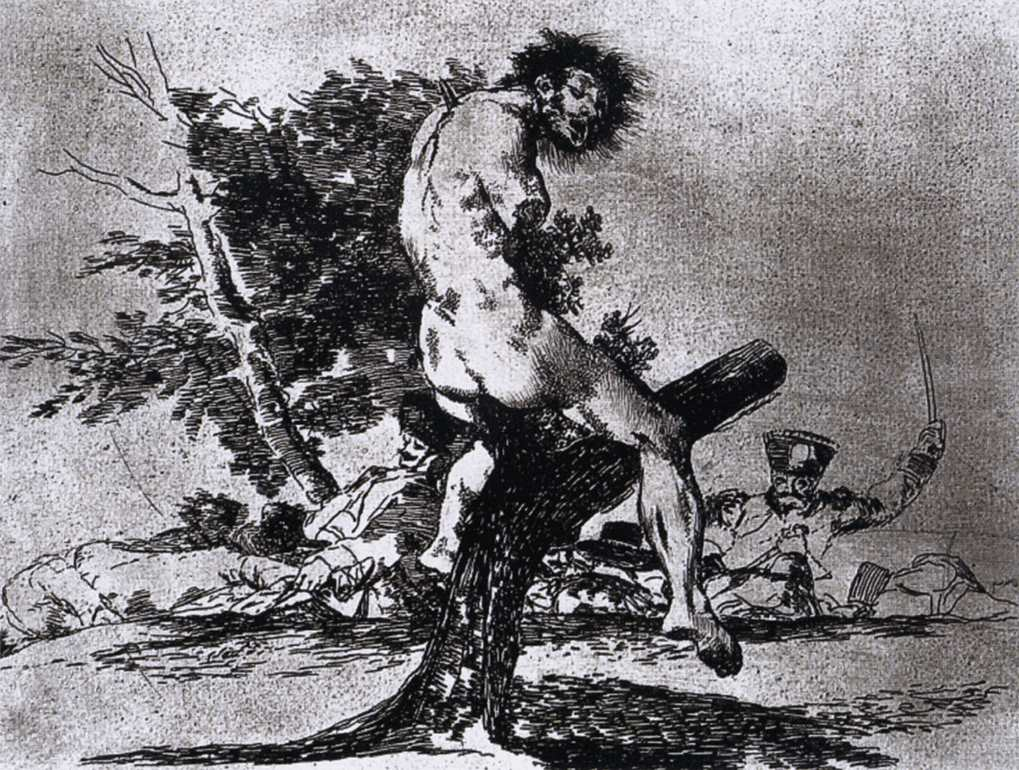
"This is worse" 1812–15 etchings of war published after Goya's death

Intervention art exists where an individual or group has strong enough beliefs to take perceived ethical action around social issues from materialism to war. Its origins within the history of art are evidenced by such work as Leonardo Da Vinci's "A cloudburst of material possessions" which depicts the artist taking a stand against the materialist status quo. Goya's Black etchings 1812–15 depict almost documentary evidence of actual war depravities. Both examples display the art of conscience.

These examples were made by artists who relied for their livelihoods on ruling class patronage so both were only posthumously made public.

=== History ===
Intervention art also contests the boundaries between the art world and the real world. Such interaction surfaced when artists started using found objects which they incorporated into painting. This began with Cubism around 1912 and the use of collage such as Kurt Schwitters' Merz.

For the remainder of the 20th century and into the early 21st century Intervention artists gravitated away from the market driven art back into the real world; "artists must be activists"... framing elephants in rooms."

==== Significant Intervention works of art ====
- 1915 – Dada publications and performances
- 1917 – Marcel Duchamp's "Fountain"
- 1937 – Picasso's Guernica
- 1952 – Letterist international, Situationists international, Vienese Actionists
- 1960s – Land art – Robert Smithson's "Spiral Jetty" and Walter De Maria, Jan Dibbets, Hans Haacke, Michael Heizer, Neil Jenney, Richard Long, David Medalla, Robert Morris, Dennis Oppenheim, Gunther Uecker.
- 1970 – Bonnie Sherk's "Sitting still" (1970), "Public Lunch" (1971), "The Park" (1974)
- 1974 – Christo's "Valley curtain"
- 1975 – Adam Purple's NYC guerrilla garden
- 1978 – Alan Sonfist's Time Landscape
- 1978 – Barry Thomas's "Vacant Lot of Cabbages", (1978) "Street Stringing" (1978, '79, 2017), rADz (1997-2001)
- 1982 – Joseph Beuys' "7000 Oaks"
- 1982 – Agnes Denes' "Wheatfield"
- 1984 - Don Joyce's Culture Jamming
- 1986 – Burning man
- 1989 – Kalle Lasn's Ad busters anti advertising
- 1999 – Stuckists
- 2003 – Bill Wasik's Flashmobs
- 2005 – Magda Sayeg's Yarn bombing
- 2011 – Pussy Riot
- 2015 – Banksy's "Dismaland" and "Walled off" (2017)
- 2023 – Ai Weiwei's "Middle finger"
- 2023 – Boris Eldagsen Wins photography prize using artificial intelligence

== Authorised ==
There are many art interventions which are carried out in contexts where relevant invitation and approval has been given.

=== Detroit MONA goes kaBOOM!, 2002 ===
The extreme to which an authorised intervention can go and yet still meet with institutional approval was shown in 2002, when the Museum of New Art in Detroit staged a show kaBoom!, with the announcement, "Over the course of the exhibition, museum visitors will be invited to smash, drop, throw and slash artworks..." The show was scheduled for two months, but by the end of the first night had been totally destroyed by visitors:

"They even destroyed the pedestals and wall shelves," one museum staffer shrugged in disbelief. Fires were set in isolated galleries and a wrecking ball for one display had been removed from its chain and used instead as a bowling ball, taking out an installation as well as the corner of one wall. "In a twisted way, it was a wild success," MONA's director Jef Bourgeau says the morning after, on a surprisingly bright note as he wades through the carnage and debris. This follows the precedent of the Dadaists. At one of their shows, visitors were invited to smash the exhibits with an axe.

=== Hanging Old Masters backwards, 2004 ===
A more usual authorised art intervention in an institution is done with great care to make sure that no harm comes to the existing collection. In 2004, the Old Town House in Cape Town, South Africa, hung its Michaelis Collection of 17th century Dutch Old Master paintings facing the wall. The curator Andrew Lamprecht said this exhibition, titled Flip, "would force gallery goers to reconsider their preconceptions about the art and its legacy." Knowledge of intent is integral to such a process, as it would be perceived differently if it were announced in a conservation context, rather than as an art piece. However, in this instance there was some ambiguity about the purpose of the exercise as Lamprecht, although stating, "I'm asking questions about the history," also added a more standard "educative" comment, "the reverse of the paintings revealed a wealth of detail not normally on view to the public, ranging from old attempts to preserve the canvas to notes from different collectors over the years," thus lessening the confrontational impact of his actions.

=== Lord Napier in red tape, 2004 ===
An authorised art intervention that required considerable effort to gain the requisite permission was the wrapping in red duct tape of the equestrian statue of Lord Napier of Magdala, situated on Queen's Gate in West London. This was done by Eleonora Aguiari, a Royal College of Art (RCA) student for her final show. When questioned as to whether she had considered a clandestine act, she replied, "No, not my style, I like to challenge the institutions." In order to do this she needed clearance letters from the RCA Rector, a professor, the Victoria and Albert Museum conservation department and the RCA conservation department, bronze tests, a scaffolding license, indemnity insurance, and permission from English Heritage (who own the statue), the City of Westminster, two Boroughs (Chelsea and Kensington, as their boundary bisects the length of the horse) and the present Lord Napier.

Then a layer of cling wrap and almost 80 rolls of red duct tape were applied by 4 people working for 4 days. Aguiari described it as "a Zen action up there in the middle of traffic, but alone with a beautiful statue. Every detail on the statue is perfect and slightly larger than normal," and said that "statuary that symbolizes military past, or imperialism should be covered to make the topics of the past visible." Aguiari then received a phone call: "Saatchi wants to talk to you," but, on keeping the appointment, she found herself talking not to Charles Saatchi but to Michael Moszynski of the advertising firm, Saatchi & Saatchi, who thought her idea would be suitable for "a Tory advertising campaign," and wanted her to wrap an ambulance in red tape. She declined the offer.

Despite her official clearance, the action caused controversy through press coverage, including a Reuters press agency photo reproduced in the Daily Times of Pakistan.

=== Paul Kuniholm at Nordic Heritage Museum, 2013 ===
Paul Kuniholm intervened his steel and textile sculptures worn on the body, with wicker art of his great-grandfather John Emil Kuniholm, posed by The Nordic Heritage Museum in 2013. The action was repeated several more times at locations such as Seattle Art Museum, Taipei, Taiwan, New York City's Central Park, and in Sweden for the Jönköping Municipality.

== Illicit ==
Some artists challenge the orthodoxy by not seeking, or perhaps not being able to obtain, permission, but carry out their intention anyway, contravening regulations—with official reactions of differing degrees of severity.

=== Concomitant, 1983 ===
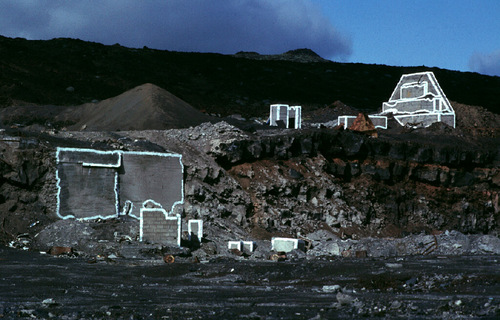
Construction drawing - La Restinga II, El Hierro, 1983

Since 1983 Eberhard Bosslet has performed site-specific outdoor intervention, so-called "Re/formations and side effects", in the Canary Islands.

=== Black Sheep, 1994 ===
In 1994, Damien Hirst curated the show Some Went Mad, Some Ran Away at the Serpentine Gallery in London, including his artwork Away from the Flock a disembowelled sheep in a tank of formaldehyde. In an interview, Hirst said that he did not mind what people thought of his work "so long as they get involved". The next day artist Mark Bridger removed the top of the artwork's tank and poured black ink into it, changed the title to Black Sheep and handed his business card to gallery staff.

Bridger was subsequently prosecuted, at Hirst's wish. The artist's defence was that he thought Hirst would benefit from the publicity and critic Tony Parsons said the artist's action proved that what Damien Hirst does is art. The exhibit was restored at a cost of £1000.

=== Two men jump naked into Tracey's bed, 1999 ===
A notable case of an unauthorised intervention—which did no damage, yet was still liable for prosecution—occurred at 12.58 p.m. on 25 October 1999, when two artists, Yuan Chai and Jian Jun Xi, jumped on Tracey Emin's installation My Bed, in the Turner Prize at Tate Britain, wearing only underwear. They called their performance Two Naked Men Jump Into Tracey's Bed. They were arrested for their action, but no charges were pressed. Chai had written, among other things, the words "ANTI STUCKISM" on his bare back. They said they were "improving" Emin's work, because they thought it had not gone far enough, and opposed the Stuckists, who are anti-performance art.

=== Banksy, c.2000 – 2023 ===
"Banksy" is the operating name of one of the best-known interventionists in the UK. He has carried out many graffiti stencillings, usually with a specific message or comment. He has also infiltrated his own artwork into museums, where they have remained for varying amounts of time before being removed. In May 2005, for example, he hung his own version of a primitive cave painting, showing a human hunting with a shopping trolley, in the British Museum. He is now one of the most sought-after artists. His work now commands millions of dollars in the auction houses of Britain and America.

In 2015 Banksy and 58 other artists created Dismaland using a disused theme park to portray the antithesis of Disneyland. In 2017 Bansky worked with local people in the West bank to establish a working Hotel the Walled Off Hotel that literally looks out onto the Israeli-constructed Israeli West Bank Barrier separating Palestinian and Israeli communities. Bansky "exhibits a strong sense of inclusivity and humanity" "It takes a lot of guts to stand up anonymously in a western democracy for things no one else believes in – like peace, justice and freedom"

=== Lennie Lee, 2005 ===
In February 2005 Jewish artist, Lennie Lee, was censored for exhibiting a piece called "Judensau" (Jew pig) in Treptow Town Hall gallery, Berlin. The intervention was organized by the other artists working in the show who claimed (incorrectly) Lee was one of them. Lee's work was designed to put the institution in a difficult position. If they left it on the wall they would be accused of anti-semitism by their opponents. On the other hand, if they took the work down, they would be censoring the work of a Jewish artist dealing with antisemitic stereotypes.

The authorities were forced to take the piece down. The piece attracted considerable attention from the media. Lee had previously "offered" to remove his "Judensau" on condition that a 14th-century sculpture of a "Judensau" was removed from the side of Martin Luther's church in Wittenberg.

=== Taking a hammer to a urinal, 2006 ===
On 4 January 2006, while on display in the Dada show in the Pompidou Centre in Paris, Marcel Duchamp's Fountain was attacked with a hammer by Pierre Pinoncelli, a 77-year-old French performance artist, causing a slight chip. Pinoncelli, who was arrested, said the attack was a work of performance art that Marcel Duchamp himself would have appreciated. This may be true, as on one occasion visitors to a Dada show were invited to smash up the exhibits with an axe. Previously in 1993, Pinoncelli urinated into the piece while it was on display in Nîmes, in southern France. Both of Pinoncelli's performances derive from neo-Dadaists' and Viennese Actionists' intervention or manoeuvre.

The Fountain attacked by Pinoncelli was actually number 5 of 8 recreated by Duchamp at a much later date, after the original one was lost. Another is on display in the Indiana University Art Museum, and there is one also in Tate Modern, where in 2000 it too was the target of a urination performance (unsuccessful according to the gallery) by Yuan Chai and Jian Jun Xi.

=== Pencils removed from Damien Hirst's Pharmacy, 2009 ===
Artist Cartrain removed a packet of Faber Castell 1990 Mongol 482 series pencils from Damien Hirst's installation at his restaurant Pharmacy. This followed Hirst's action against Cartrain for using copies of Hirst's work. Cartrain stated:

For the safe return of Damien Hirsts pencils I would like my artworks back that Dacs and Hirst took off me in November. Its not a large demand he can have his pencils back when I get my artwork back. Dacs are now not taking any notice of my emails and I have asked nicely more than five times to try and resolve this matter. Hirst has until the end of this month to resolve this or on 31 July the pencils will be sharpened. He has been warned.

== Illicit confronts the approved ==
Although the legal technicalities are straightforward, when an unauthorised intervention intervenes in an officially sanctioned one, the moral issues may be far less straightforward, especially when the legal act meets with widespread public disapproval (even to the point of considering it vandalism), while the illicit reaction to it satisfies a public sense of justice.

=== String up the perpetrator, 2003 ===
In spring 2003, artist Cornelia Parker intervened in Auguste Rodin's sculpture The Kiss (1886) in Tate Britain by wrapping it in a mile of string. This was a historical reference to Marcel Duchamp's use of the same length of string to create a web inside a gallery. Although the intervention had been endorsed by the gallery, many people felt it offensive to the original artwork and an act of vandalism rather than art. This reaction then prompted a further, unauthorised, intervention, in which Parker's string was cut by Stuckist Piers Butler, while couples stood around engaging in live kissing.

=== Sticking it to Goya, 2003 ===
In 2003, Jake and Dinos Chapman montaged clown and other "funny" faces onto a set of etchings of Goya's The Disasters of War (which they had purchased), thereby intervening in the original work. Aside from complaints on the grounds of bad taste, this act was described by some as "defacement", although the set was a late 1930s printing. Ostensibly as a protest against this piece, Aaron Barschak (who later became famous for gate-crashing Prince William's 21st birthday party dressed as Osama bin Laden in a frock) threw a pot of red paint over Jake Chapman during a talk he was giving in May 2003.

The Chapmans then added monster heads to Goya's Los Caprichos etchings and exhibited them at the White Cube in 2005 under the title Like a dog returns to its vomit. Like other interventionists they asserted this was an improvement on the original: "You can't vandalise something by making it more expensive." However, Dinos pointed out one problem: "sometimes it is difficult to make the original Goya etchings any nastier; in one I found a witch sexually molesting a baby.".

=== Throwing something at boxes, 2006 ===
Another example at the Tate was an intervention in Rachel Whiteread's Embankment installation in the Turbine Hall of Tate Modern on 25 February 2006. Whiteread's site-specific installation consisted of large piles of white plastic cubes, made by using a mould from cardboard boxes. Jonathan Meese, a German performance artist had staged a scheduled event in this environment, erecting props, and giving a wild monologue. During this, an object was thrown, or fell, from the walkway over the hall, landing with a bang. This was seen as intentional and considered by some people an art intervention, while others thought it was simply vandalism. A month later, the Tate pronounced on this incident, "works get interfered with all the time and people often are unsure of the boundaries or social etiquette of Art and react accordingly, sometimes going beyond the pale."

=== Art addressing social and environmental issues via self funded and local media ===
==== String works ====
In 1978 Barry Thomas strung up a suburban street in Wellington, New Zealand and with friends delivered the Claremont Grove street directory so the neighbours could get to know each other. It was the first of many string works, the latest being in Dunedin in 2017 where he tied up 13 kilometres of flood prone lower Dunedin with the safe, wealthier areas – ending in a circle tied in a knot at the opening of the Art and Revolution symposium.

==== Relational guerrilla gardening ====
In 1978 the Vacant lot of Cabbages was an illegally planted guerrilla garden in Wellington New Zealand. It attracted widespread public support and involvement via substantial media coverage and proved a significant moment in art and social history leading to many other urban initiatives like Tactical Urbanism and was an early Anthropocene art activism.

=== Fearless Girl and Charging Bull, 2017 ===
A rare inversion of this was the placement of Fearless Girl, part of a marketing campaign for State Street Global Advisors, in opposition to Charging Bull in New York City. Charging Bull was originally placed illicitly by sculptor Arturo Di Modica on Broad Street, opposite the New York Stock Exchange, in 1989. The city moved the statue to the Bowling Green, where it has remained on an expired temporary permit. While the placement of Fearless Girl was endorsed by New York City, it was opposed by Di Modica. In 2018, New York City mayor Bill de Blasio announced that both statues would be moved to face the New York Stock Exchange, no longer in opposition.

== Contesting the rules redefines art ==
A non-authorised and yet not illicit ploy is sometimes adopted, by carrying out purportedly "normal" behaviour, while finding loopholes in the regulations, pushing them to the limit, using them against the regulators and in 1917 heralding the future of art itself.

=== Duchamp, 1917 and influences ===
A seminal example of this approach took place in 1917 when Marcel Duchamp submitted a urinal (laid on its back, signed by him "R.Mutt 1917", and titled Fountain) to the Society of Independent Artists exhibition. The Society had proclaimed their open-mindedness by stating they would accept all work submitted, only anticipating that conventional media (paintings) would be. Duchamp was a member of the Society's board, and interpreted the regulations at face-value. His entry was immediately rejected as "not being art", and he resigned from the board shortly after. The original Fountain was lost. Fifty years later, Duchamp commissioned reproductions, which were then highly sought by museums.

In 1961, fellow Dadaist, Hans Richter, wrote to Duchamp:

You threw a bottle rack and urinal in their faces as a challenge and now they admire them for their aesthetic beauty.

Duchamp wrote "Ok, ça va très bien" ("that's fine") in the margin beside it, and the quote is often erroneously attributed to him.

=== Legacy ===
Duchamp's collective name for this and his other "readymades" tested the boundaries between the real and the art worlds.

Joseph Kosuth said "... With the unassisted Readymade, art changed its focus from the form of the language to what was being said…This change – one from 'appearance' to 'conception' – was the beginning of 'modern' art and the beginning of conceptual art. All art (after Duchamp) is conceptual (in nature) because art only exists conceptually."

His key advance here was to rail against what he termed "retinal thinking" especially around the visual aspects of art making versus what he called the "gray matter"

"Fountain" was named in 2004 as the world's most influential work of art that opened the door to modern art.

Duchamp also foresaw several trends in art and society with revolutionary concepts such as "I have forced myself to contradict myself in order to avoid conforming to my own taste" and that he "preferred breathing rather than working" He chose indifference to good or bad taste selection criteria for his readymades.

As the head of the hanging committee Duchamp displayed an egalitarian propensity in his alphabetical hanging criteria at the 1917 Society of Independents exhibition. Because his deliberate testing of the segregation between artist created objects and the readymade object with his "Fountain" the board voted to reject it so Duchamp and his patron Walter Arensberg resigned their board seats.

Along with these concepts and his notion that the artist does not act in isolation, and it takes the viewer to complete the work of art, he foresaw the art movements such as Conceptual Art, Happenings, Land Art, Relational Aesthetics, Intervention art and more.

The 1960s heralded many such boundary shattering social movements such as the Sexual revolution, The environmental movement, followed by the Occupy and the MeToo movement along with an "aesthetic revolution".

Duchamp developed an almost allergic reaction to polemic thinking preferring the third way of "indifference" to "even" out "good" and "bad" taste. His chess book was called "Opposition and sister squares reconciled". In 1966 summarizing his own legacy (and perhaps pointing to the direction of art returning to the real world, not unlike his "reciprocal readymade") Duchamp said his life's work amounted to "Using painting, using art, to create a modus vivendi, a way of understanding life; that is, for the time being, of trying to make my life into a work of art itself, instead of spending my life creating works of art in the form of paintings or sculptures."

In 2023 Boris Eldagsen won the Sony World Photography Awards admitting he used Artificial Intelligence to create his image.

In his book "The Cubist Painters" Guillaume Apollinaire prophesized that Marcel Duchamp, being as detached from aesthetic preoccupations, may in future reconcile art and the people.

=== Stuckist clowns at the Tate, 2000–05 ===
The Stuckists have followed Duchamp's lead in exploiting regulations to their own advantage in yearly demonstrations outside the Turner Prize (2000–05) at Tate Britain. Prior to their first demonstration (dressed as clowns), they obtained written permission from the gallery that this form of dress was acceptable, and then walked round the Turner Prize wearing it.

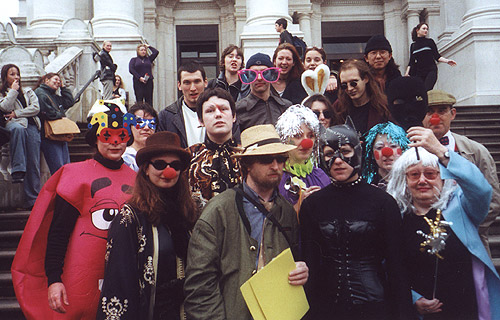
Stuckist artists dressed as clowns intervene at the Turner Prize, Tate Britain, in 2000

In 2002, when Martin Creed won with lights going on and off in an empty room, they flicked flashlights on and off outside, and in 2003 displayed a blow-up sex doll to parody Jake and Dinos Chapman's bronze (painted) sculpture modelled on one, by claiming they had the original. Although barred from the prize ceremony, they have succeeded in infiltrating it psychologically to the extent that twice they have been mentioned by the guest of honour on live TV, just before the announcement of the winner. They have also handed out manifestos to arriving guests at the Tate (and the Saatchi Gallery), thus getting their message carried into the events from which they were excluded.

As the Stuckists condemn performance art as not real art, it raises the question as to whether their activities—which are carried out by artists and would therefore normally be classified as "art"—are still classified as "art", if they do not classify it that way themselves. On one occasion they were given an award for conceptual art by the proto-MU group nevertheless.

== Art or vandalism? ==
It is claimed that the legitimacy and artistic value of an art intervention may vary, depending on the perception and standpoint of the viewer. The following statement, entitled Stuckism Handy Guide to the Artworld, first appeared on the Stuckist website with specific reference to the Meese incident at Tate Modern, and was then posted by Jennifer Maddock on the Artforum board with the comment, "I found a pretty cynical attempt to differentiate between vandalism and intervention while I was reading about the event in Tate Modern, for example the Stuckists' cynical definition":

An act by an individual which interferes with an existing artwork is termed an "intervention" and the individual termed an "artist" if they are endorsed by a Tate curator or are dead. The same, or similar, act by an individual interfering with the same artwork (or even interfering with the interference to the artwork), if they are alive and are not endorsed by a Tate curator, is termed "vandalism", and the individual termed a "criminal."

Sometimes art vandalism is used to make a political protest. Whether this is or isn't regarded as a legitimate political act, it is not normally seen as art, nor until recently would the question have even arisen. However, with the increasing dissolution of boundaries between art and life, and the broadening of art's scope, there has been an increasing tendency to view unusual or spectacular actions as art, even though the actions were never intended as art.

=== Damien Hirst and 9/11, 2002 ===
Public outrage followed one attempt to reclassify an event in art terms on 10 September 2002, the eve of the first anniversary of the 9/11 World Trade Center attacks, when Damien Hirst said in an interview with BBC News Online:

The thing about 9/11 is that it's kind of like an artwork in its own right ... David Hockney said that it was the 'most wicked piece of artwork'—a lot of people have compared it to a work of art. Of course, it's visually stunning and you've got to hand it to them on some level because they've achieved something which nobody would have ever have thought possible—especially to a country as big as America. So on one level they kind of need congratulating, which a lot of people shy away from, which is a very dangerous thing.

The following week, he issued a statement through his company, Science Ltd:

I apologise unreservedly for any upset I have caused, particularly to the families of the victims of the events on that terrible day.

== Other meanings ==
=== Corporate art intervention ===
The book Privatising Culture: Corporate Art Intervention Since the 1980s by Chin-Tao Wu was published in 2001 in New York. One aim of the book is to counter the effect of skinflint policies instituted by Margaret Thatcher and Ronald Reagan that slashed government funding of art, to encourage increased private funding of the arts, and how, for example, the consequent change in membership of trustee boards from academics to corporate executives has inevitably lead to potential conflicts of interest.

=== Art therapy ===
The National Institute for Trauma and Loss in Children uses the term "art intervention" in the sense of art therapy., as does the University of Hong Kong, which states:

Therapeutic art intervention for older adult.
The use of artistic intervention to improve the quality of life of the elderly persons has gained attention from health care professionals quite recently. The course will introduce the theoretical perspectives and applications of art orientations in service delivery. Advanced skills of using different artistic and non-verbal communication means to enhance expression of those with dementia and neurological impairment will be taught by progressive and experiential methods.

=== Art installation ===
There is also a widespread use of the term "art intervention" to refer not to a particular intended or achieved act, but generically to any presence of art or artists in an environment, where this may not have previously been the case. The extensive use of this is shown in instances from the London Borough of Bexley ("This Strategy aims to put 'culture at the heart of regeneration', and will build on the success of the first major Public Art intervention in the borough—The Erith Arts Project"), to Neal Civic Center in Florida ("Plans include video documentation of this project so it can be used as a prototype for rural art intervention programs nationwide"), and Mayor Howard W. Peak, City of San Antonio, Texas (with the wish to "disseminate 'best practices' models of national art intervention programs").

Another example is Wochenklausur, where the issue of homelessness was dealt with by intervening artists.

=== Tactical urbanism and beyond ===
Intervention by artists and especially western, democratic citizens has become widespread including yarn bombing, flash mobs, guerrilla art, street art, graffiti, performance art, Adbusters, ephemeral art, environmental art to the occupy movement, guerrilla cycling, guerrilla gardening, urban agriculture, Extinction Rebellion and anthropocene activism, climate change activism, and even de-growth advocates. Governments along with regional and local councils have adopted tactical urbanism processes and boundary setting to keep a lid on and embrace these widespread interventionist movements. A growing number of people want to have their say in shaping their local and global environments. The UK town of Todmorden developed guerrilla gardening as its tourist brand, even growing corn at the police station. This has benefitted the local economy. "Culture jamming" is an intervention and was popularized by Naomi Klein in her No Logo book but was a much earlier invention by Don Joyce. In 2023 Ai Weiwei's Middle finger app 'The bird' allows users to disapprove of any place on earth using a picture of Ai's middle finger superimposed on images from Google Maps.

== See also ==
- Contemporary art
- Environmental art
- Ephemeral art
- Appropriation (art)
- Art and dementia
- Classificatory disputes about art
- Conceptual art
- Guerrilla art
- Guerrilla gardening
- Yarn bombing
- Graffiti
- Street Art
- Found object
- Installation art
- Performance art
- Stuckist demonstrations
- Urban interventionism
- Yuan Chai and Jian Jun Xi
