= Yarnbombing Los Angeles =

Guerrilla knitting group

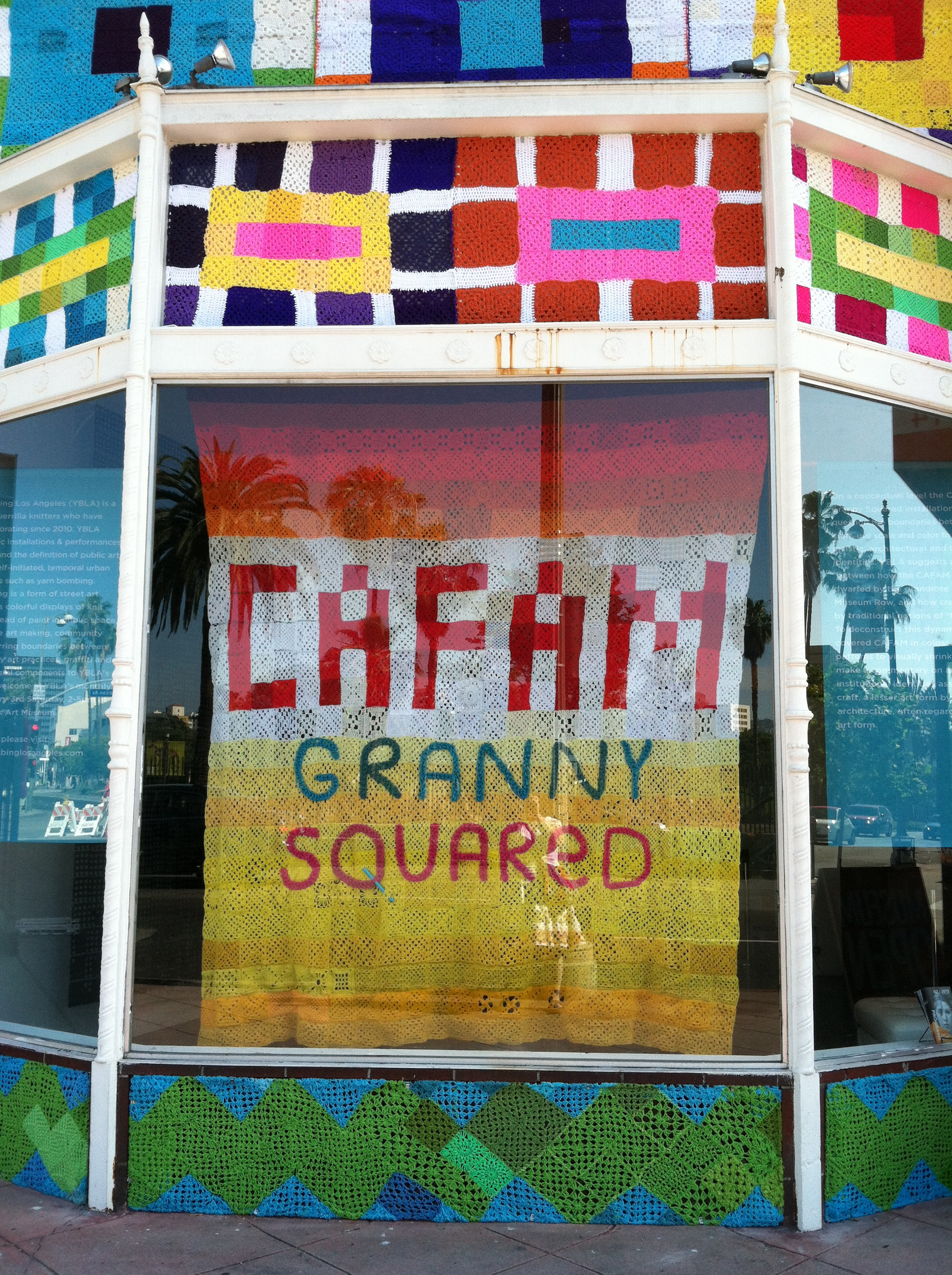
Yarnbombing Los Angeles

Yarnbombing Los Angeles (YBLA) is a group of guerrilla knitters that have been collaborating since 2010. They are based at the 18th Street Arts Center in Santa Monica, California. YBLA stages public installation art and performances to help expand the definition of public art to embrace street art, Urban Interventionism and ephemera. Collaborative art making, community building, public outreach, blurring boundaries between contemporary art practices, graffiti and craft are integral components to YBLA's practice.

== History ==
YBLA organically grew out of a series of participatory yarn bombing events in Los Angeles, California. Inspired by the book Yarn Bombing: The Art of Crochet and Knit Graffiti by Mandy Moore and Leanne Prain, Heather Hoggan of Arroyo Arts Collective and Amy Inouye of Future Studio decided to organize Fig Knit On in October 2010. The event took place on Figueroa Street in Highland Park, Los Angeles and had 19 local participants.

The group stayed together when Fig Knit On participant Arzu Arda Kosar invited Hoggan to another yarn bombing at the 18th Street Arts Center on June 18, 2011 and 12 of the Fig Knit On participants signed on. What followed was a six month process of putting together Yarn Bombing 18th Street where local participants met monthly at Kosar’s 18th Street studio and some even developed additional projects such as the Empathy Circle.

Yarnbombing 18th Street formed a Facebook page and was soon joined by 50 local and international cohorts who signed up to create their own original site-specific installations. Due to the diversity of the participants, Yarn Bombing 18th Street ended up becoming an international survey of the yarn bombing movement showcasing a wide variety of installations that ranged from the highly political to whimsical to conceptual pieces. The event deliberately coincided with the 18th Street Arts Center's Debating Through the Arts event by Inez S. Bush & Jerri Allyn, who was a member of the Woman's Building, and so Yarnbombing 18th Street was therefore presented in relation to a movement that questioned established art practices on material, technical, and conceptual levels.

The group then yarn bombed their own cars outside the Museum of Contemporary Art, Los Angeles’s Art in the Streets show in August 2011 to bring yarn bombing to the attention of street art lovers. By then the group adopted the collective name Yarnbombing Los Angeles (YBLA). The core members, participants and level of involvement among collaborators have been fluid based on project.

== Art ==
YBLA activities range from knit graffiti workshops for Los Angeles Unified School District teachers, students, and their parents, to installing hugging trees around town, ongoing participatory projects such as the Urban Letters and Forest for the Trees and interactive installations such as the Wishing Tree and “Wish I Were Here” pillows.

YBLA’s largest endeavor to date is CAFAM Granny Squared, a self-produced grassroots project that brought together an international community of over 500 artists and crafters to cover the façade of the Craft and Folk Art Museum with granny squares to make a statement about artistic and institutional identities. CAFAM Granny Squared was installed in May 2013 and dismantled in September 2013. Leftover contributions were assembled into blankets as part of a collaboration with the Downtown Women's Center. Christopher Knight, art critic at the Los Angeles Times, referred to the installation as "wonderfully weird," "jarringly playful," and "disconcertingly fuzzy," while placing it into a context with Minimalist repetition and Bauhaus textile arts.

YBLA has monthly meetings every 3rd Saturday from 2-5pm at the Craft and Folk Art Museum that are open to the public.

== Literature ==
Yarn Bombing Los Angeles released a self-published catalog of an exhibit held at 18th Street Arts Complex, Santa Monica, CA in June 2011 titled Yarn Bombing 18th Street by Arzu Arda Kosar. Another book, CAFAM Granny Squared: Yarnbombing Los Angeles was published in 2013, to document the event of that name.
