= Stephen Duneier =

American economist

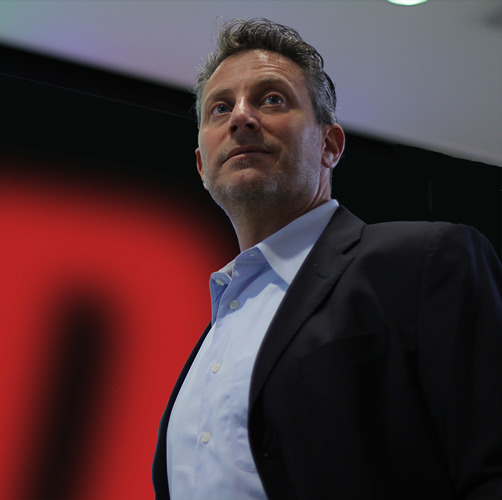
- Born: July 1967 (age 59); Brooklyn, New York
- Education: MBA in finance and economics
- Alma mater: New York University, Stern School of Business
- Occupations: Founder and CEO of Bija Advisors LLC, Lecturer at University of California, Artist, Author
- Known for: Incorporating Cognitive Science with Investment Management, Yarnbombing in the Wilderness, Extreme Goal Achievement
- Spouse: Barbara
- Website: yarnbomber.com

Stephen Duneier is an American professional investment manager, strategy consultant, speaker, lecturer, author, artist and Guinness World Record holder.

== Education ==
Duneier attended the University of Florida from 1985 to 1987 before leaving to pursue a career in financial management with Drexel Burnham Lambert and then Prudential-Bache. He finished his undergraduate education at Florida Atlantic University with a BBA in finance and economics and received an MBA in finance and economics from New York University's Stern School of Business.

== Career in finance ==
While still attending graduate school at NYU, Duneier worked as a foreign exchange option trader specializing in exotic derivatives at Credit Suisse in New York City. He was later hired by Bank of America to expand their foreign exchange business into European crosses and Emerging Markets and eventually promoted to Global Head of Currency Option Trading. Soon after Bank of America merged with Nations Bank, Duneier moved to AIG International where he was eventually named managing director in charge of Emerging Markets trading and based out of London, England. In 2002, Duneier launched a proprietary trading portfolio known as "TIP" for AIG International. Shortly after the firm merged with Banque AIG, Duneier became a global macro portfolio manager at London Diversified Fund Management in London and later at Peloton Partners in Santa Barbara, California. In 2008, he was one of the founding partners at Grant Capital Partners which grew to $1.25 billion in assets under management. He left in 2012 to launch Bija Capital Management and eventually Bija Advisors LLC, a consulting firm which advises experienced hedge fund managers, CIO's and asset allocators. Through Bija Advisors, he speaks on and publishes a subscription based newsletter covering topics on economics, cognitive science, and investment management. Duneier's book, AlphaBrain was released in March 2019 (Wiley & Sons).

== Career as a cognitive science practitioner ==
In 2001, Duneier began to apply his approach to decision making, which he calls "Bija", to his personal life, leading to a long string of eccentric goals and resolutions being set and achieved. In 2012, it reached fever pitch when he embarked upon 12 for 2012, a New Year's resolution which included 12 Learning Resolutions and 12 Giving Resolutions. As part of his resolutions, he has performed at comedy clubs; learned to fly a helicopter; climbed iced waterfalls; raced cars; had root canal without anesthetic; learned to speak German; read 50 books in 52 weeks; participated in the Pier to Peak half marathon; learned to unicycle; used jumping stilts to hike; fostered a pit bull; built homes for families in Arizona; learned ballroom dancing, how to drum, slackline, parkour, skydive; and flown planes aerobatically.

He set the Guinness World Record for the largest crocheted granny square. It is 1,311 square feet, incorporates more than 30 miles of yarn and weighs over 60 pounds. It took 2 years, 7 months and 17 days to create, and required more than 500,000 double crochet stitches.

Duneier now speaks and writes about his experience and how others can take insights from research conducted in the field of cognitive science in order to make better decisions and achieve bigger goals.

== Career as a lecturer ==
Duneier teaches undergraduate and graduate level courses on decision analysis in the UC Santa Barbara College of Engineering.

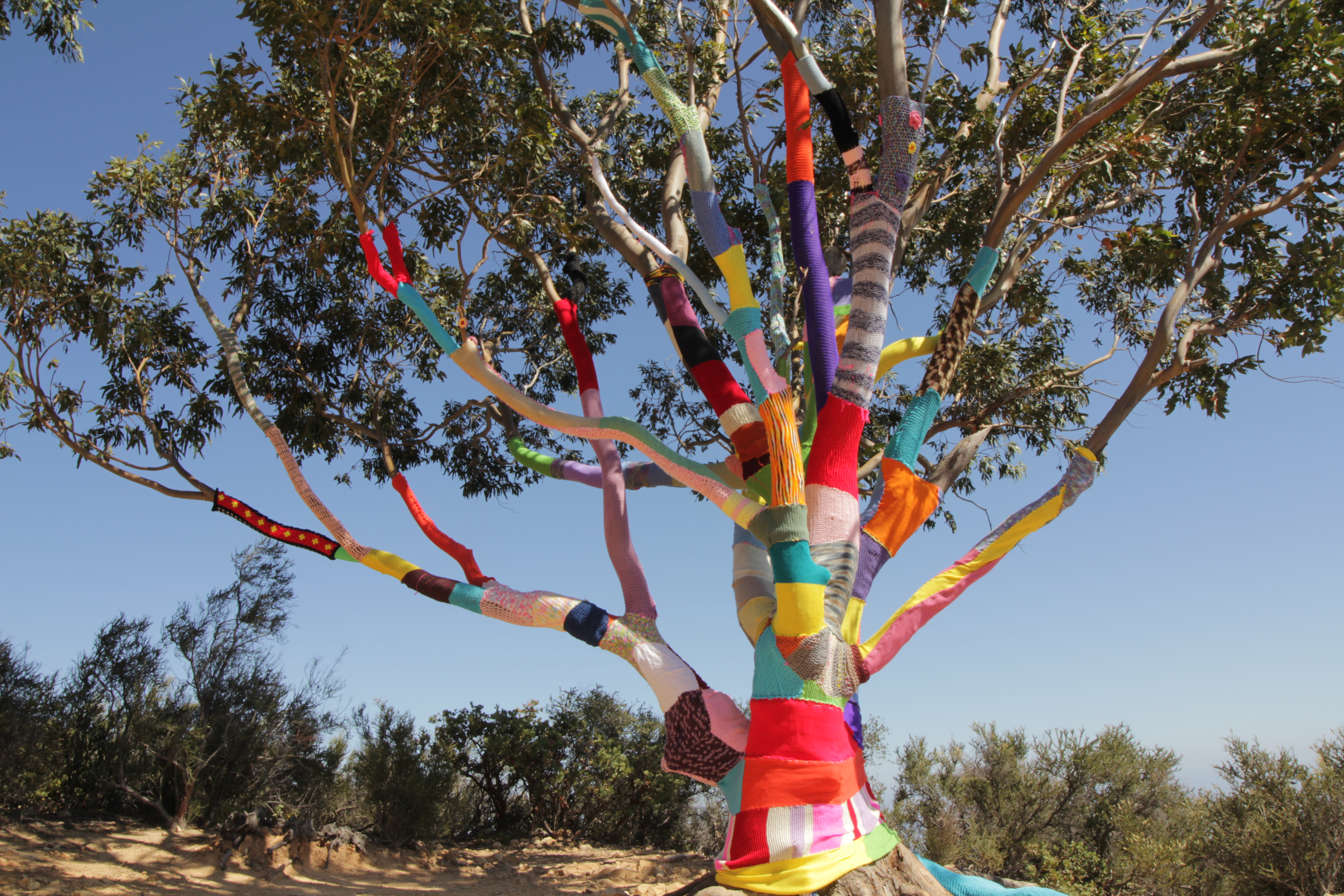
40 ft tall eucalyptus tree 2.6 miles up the Cold Spring Trail wrapped with yarn.

== Career as an artist ==
Duneier is an installation artist, part of the fiber-art movement known as Yarnbombing. His installations exist for just 9 days typically in Los Padres National Forest.

As part of his 2012 resolution to learn 12 new skills, Duneier learned how to knit. His first project was the covering of a 40-foot tall eucalyptus tree, 2.6 miles up the Cold Spring Trail in Santa Barbara, California. It required 450 square feet of knitted material. The installation remained for just 9 days and all material used was donated to Warm Up America, a charity in North Carolina.

The following year he wrapped a massive boulder atop the Saddlerock hiking trail above Montecito, California.

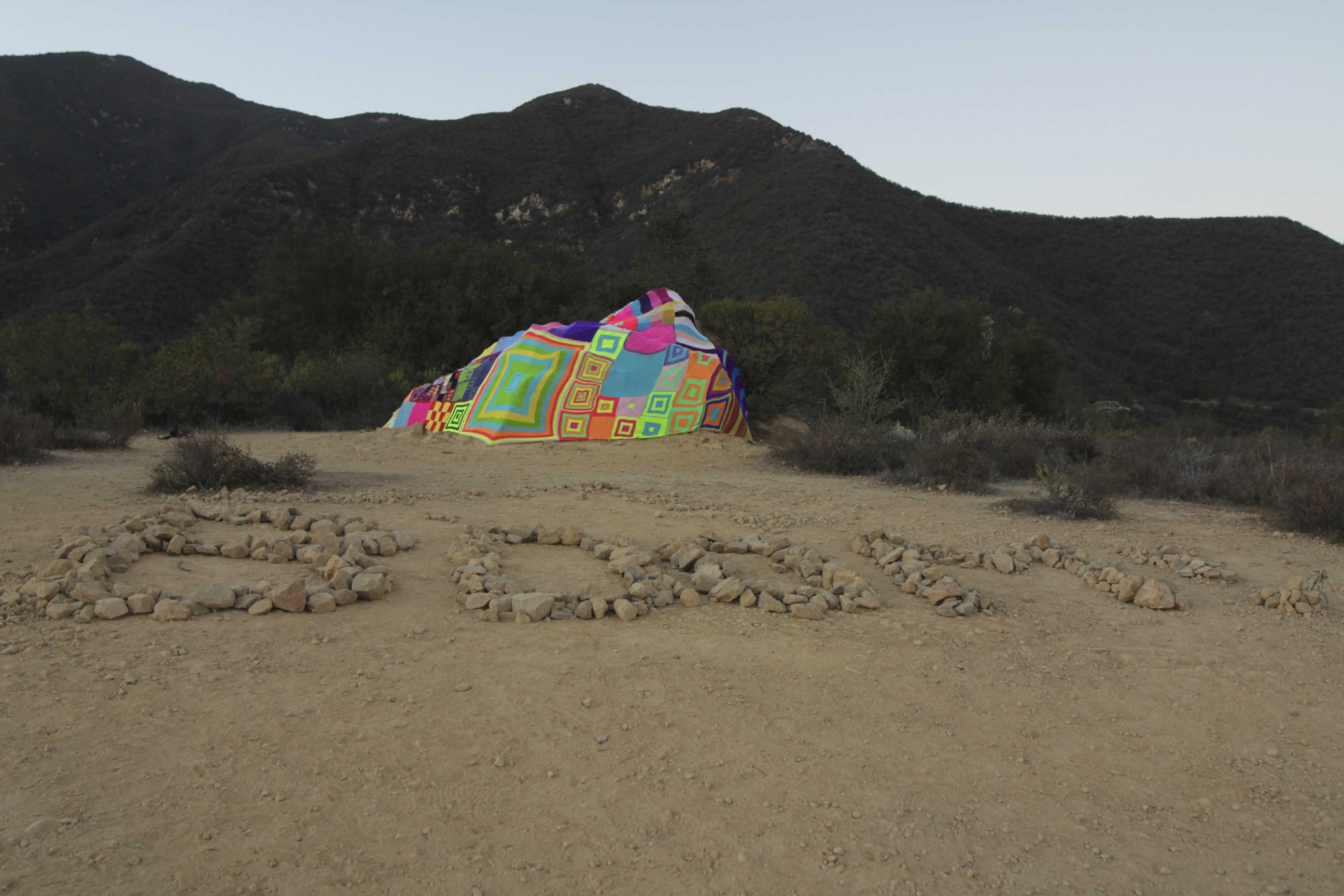
Photo of the 2013 yarnbomb installation by Stephen Duneier atop Saddlerock in the mountains above Montecito California.

His third installation was a large spiderweb made out of yarn which covered Sasquatch Cave in The Playgrounds at Lizard's Mouth.

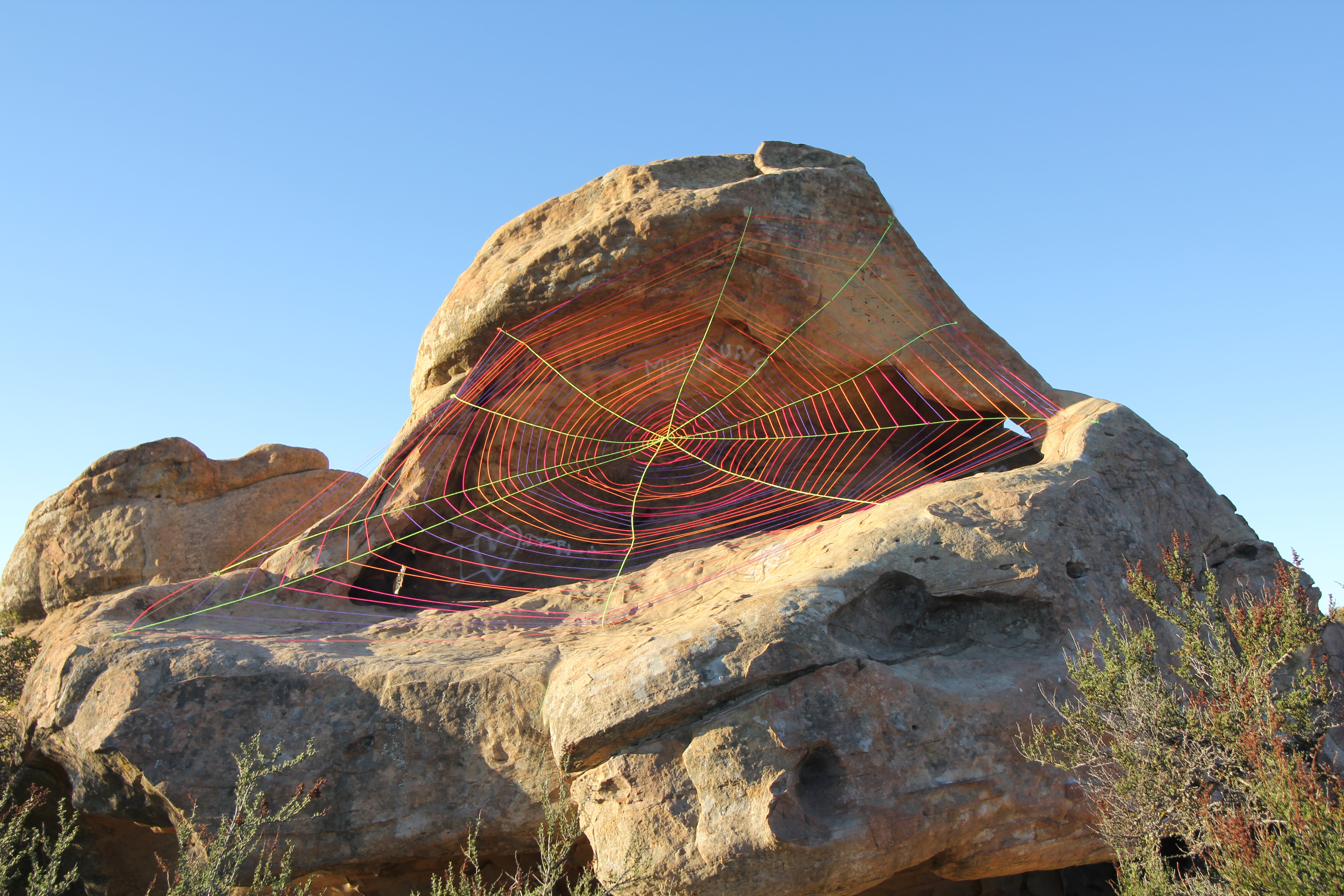
Sasquatch Cave at Lizards Mouth in Santa Barbara California

For his fourth installation, Duneier created a giant starfish made with reflective yarn from Red Heart Yarns and hung it 40 feet above the Seven Falls Trail.

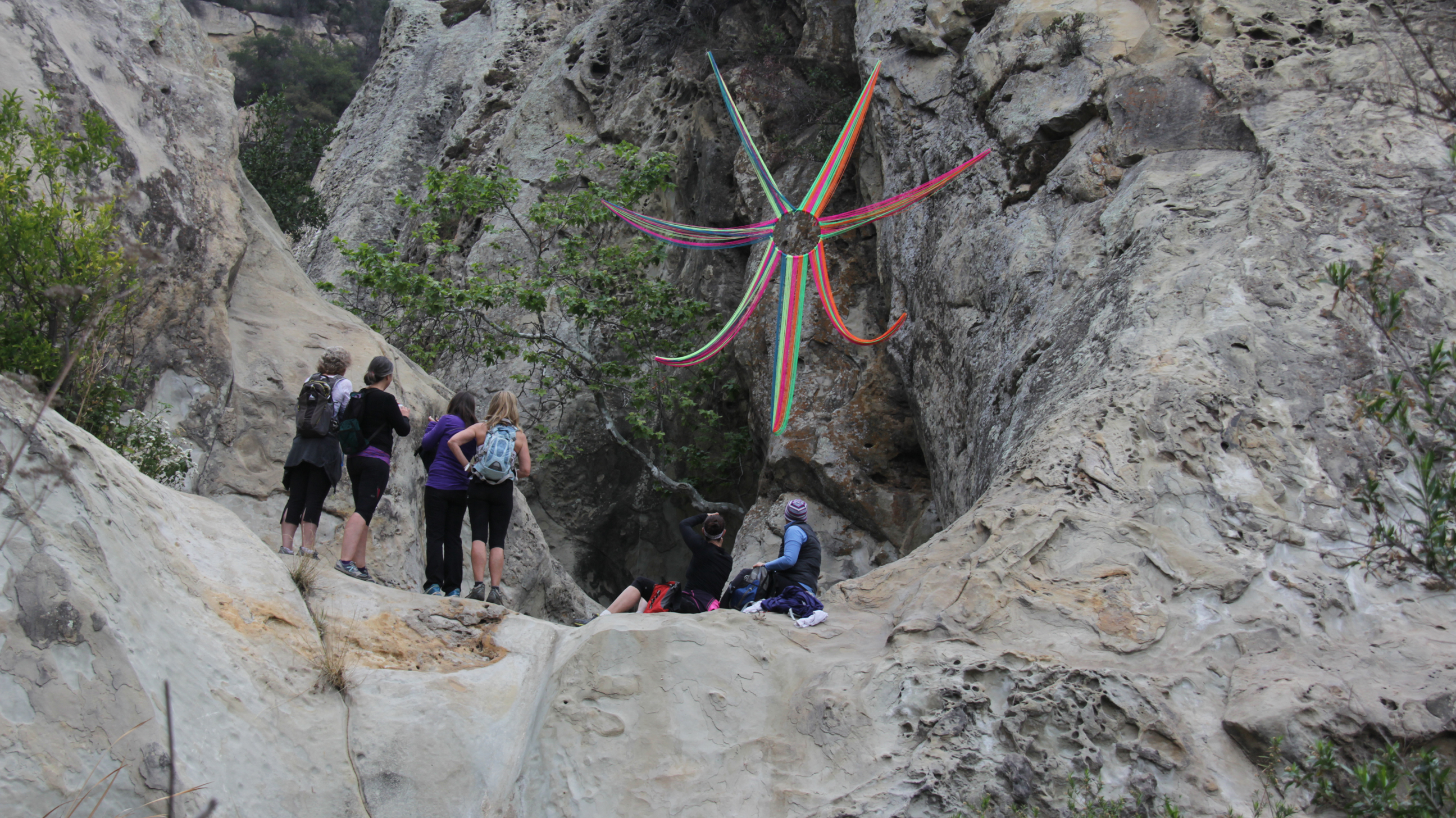
Seven Falls Trail in the mountains of Santa Barbara California

His fifth installation occurred at Santa Barbara City College where he laid out nearly 2,500 square feet of knitted and crocheted pieces on their lawn.

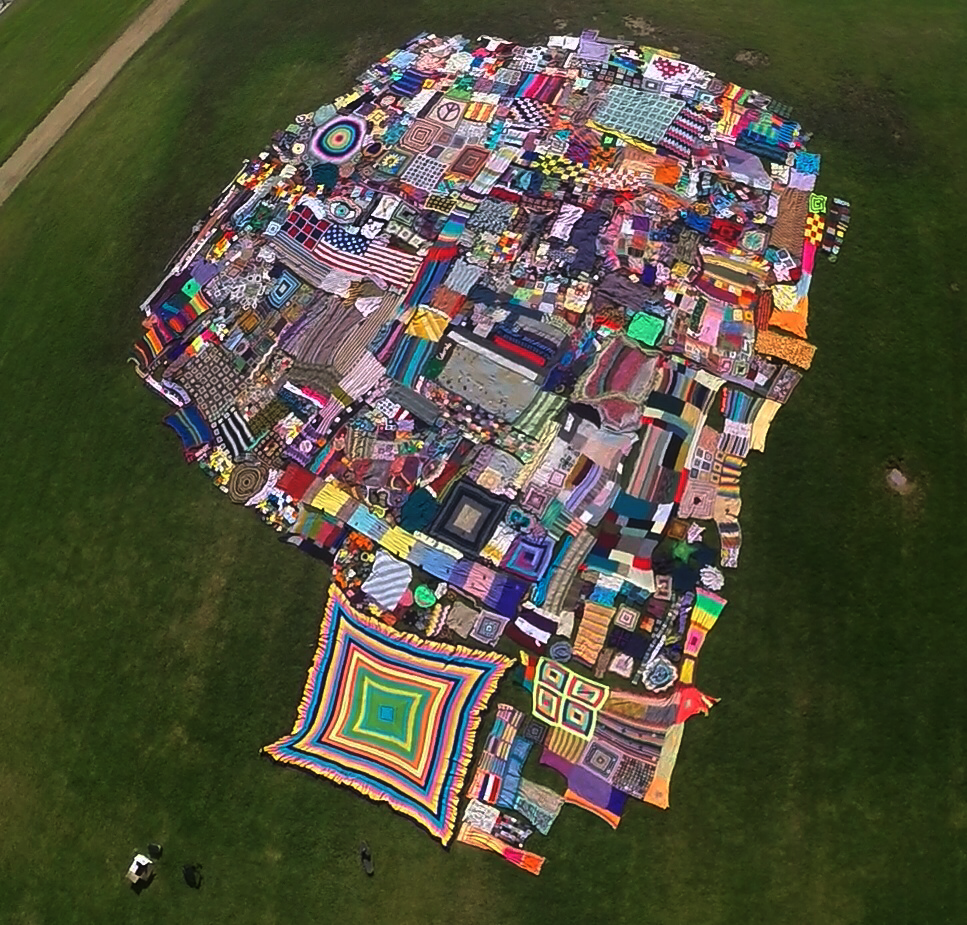
2,500 square feet of knitted and crocheted material laid out at SBCC in Santa Barbara.

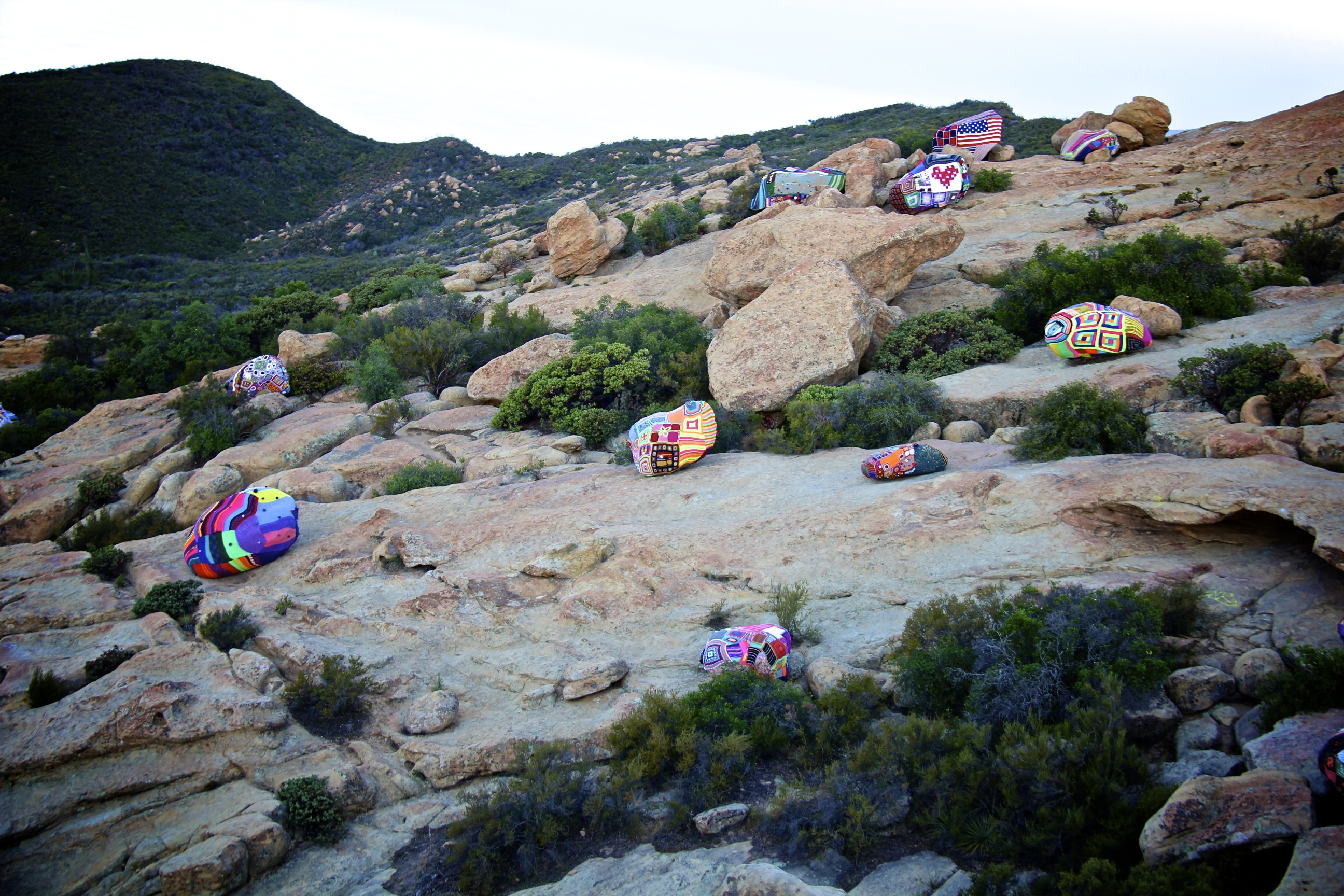
18 massive boulders wrapped with yarn at Lizard's Mouth in Los Padres National Forest above Santa Barbara, CA.

For his sixth installation, he invited fiber artists from around the world to collaborate with him by sending crocheted and knitted pieces of any size, shape, color and style to participate. He received contributions from 388 artists in 36 countries and all 50 US States. Combined with his own work, he wrapped 18 giant boulders at Lizards Mouth in the Los Padres National Forest above Santa Barbara in California.

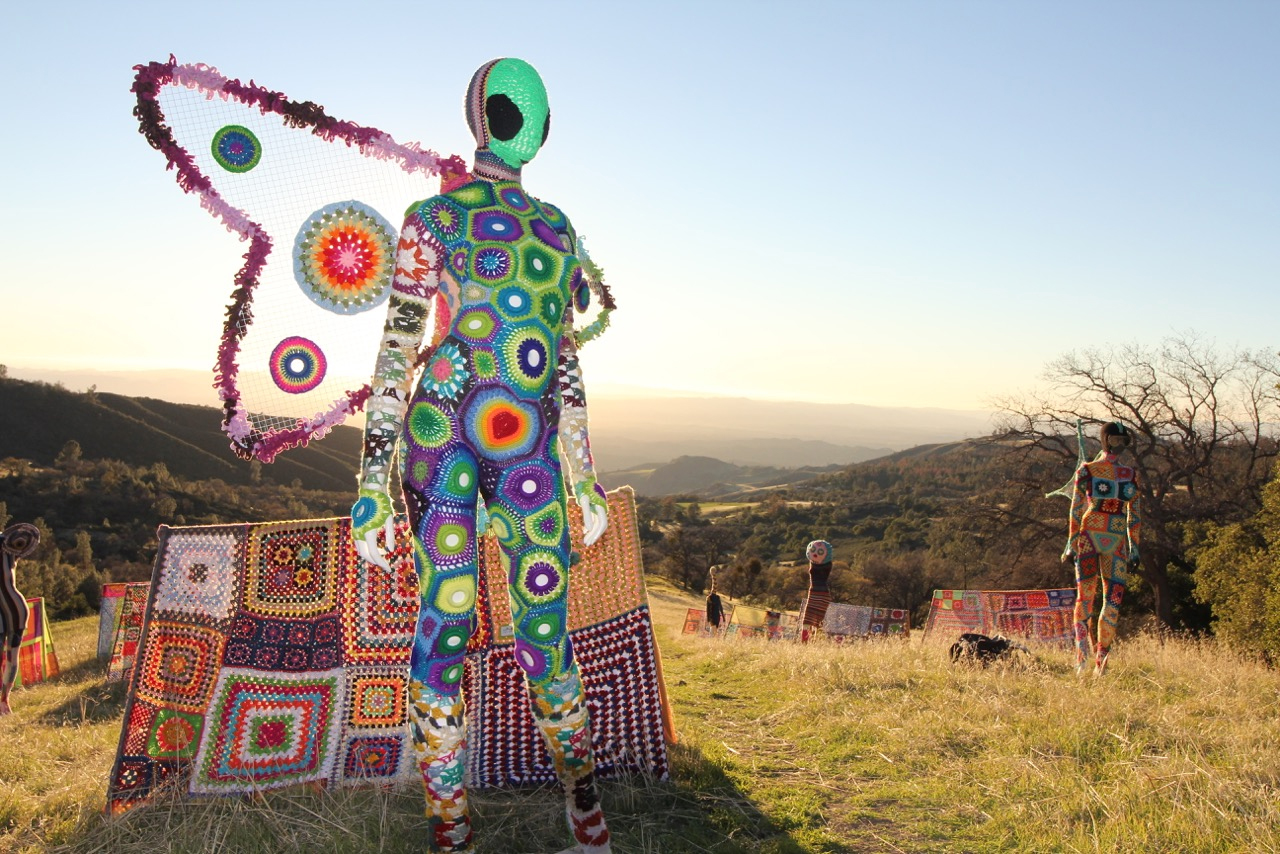
10 aliens and 24 tents covered with yarn line the canyon at Davey Brown Trailhead above Santa Ynez in California.

His most recent project was called the Alien Campsite where he incorporated additional materials including fiberglass, wood, and metal in addition to yarn. He created 10 aliens and 24 tents for the installation which lasted just 36 hours before being ripped apart by high winds in the canyon. The installation was permitted by the US Forest Service for the area just below the Davey Brown Trailhead. It incorporated Duneier's own work plus contributions from 656 fiber artists from 41 countries and all 50 states. Duneier's work is represented by the Sullivan Goss Gallery.

As part of his stated mission to build a global community of kind and creative people, Duneier hosts the Yarnbomber podcast in which he features interviews with famous yarnbombers from around the world including Carol Hummel, London Kaye and Jessie Hemmons.

== See also ==
- Cognitive bias
- Land art
- Site-Specific Art
- Environmental art
- Decision Analysis
- Bija
- Yarnbombing
- Fiber art
