= Knit the City =

London knitting group

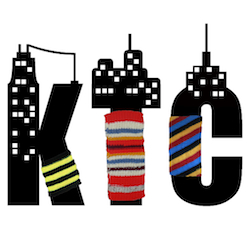
Knit the City logo.

Knit the City is a group of "graffiti knitting and crochet" street artists founded in London, England in 2009. The collective is credited with being the first to go beyond the simple 'cosies' of early graffiti knitting to tell 'stitched stories', using knitted and crochet amigurumi creatures and objects in their public installations. This practice has been taken up by groups internationally.

The title Knit the City: A Whodunnknit Set in London by Deadly Knitshade was published in German by [Hoffmann Und Campe] in February 2011, and in the UK by Summersdale in September 2011. The book covers the group's history and showcases examples of their street art.

The street art has been called "knit graffiti" and yarn bombing or "yarnstorming". The group's aim is "to guerilla knit the city of London, and beyond that the world, and bring the art of the sneaky stitch to a world without wool".

Knit the City was founded by Lauren O'Farrell (under the pseudonym Deadly Knitshade) in February 2009 with six members. The 'Yarn Corps' grew to seven members with the addition of The Fastener in late 2009. In October 2010 two members left the group and one became inactive, leaving the group with four active members. The group continued to graffiti knit as a foursome of Deadly Knitshade, The Fastener, Shorn-a the Dead and Lady Loop.

== History ==
Knit the City maintains a sense of humour about their group's beginnings and tells a different story each time they are interviewed. The genuine story is that the collective was founded by Deadly Knitshade, later revealed to be author and Stitch London founder Lauren O'Farrell, who anonymously invited five hand-picked members to join forces in February 2009 on a mission to "turn the city knitwise".

The collective was partly inspired by O'Farrell's 2007 London Lion Scarf charity event, when her Stitch London craft community created giant scarves for London's Trafalgar Square Lions to raise money for Cancer Research UK, and partly by a 2009 event in which Magda Sayeg of Knitta Please, Stitch London, and Guardian journalist Perri Lewis collaborated in graffiti knitting London's South Bank.

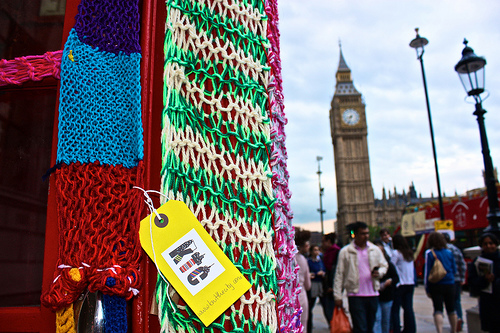
Knit the City Phonebox Cosy, London, Parliament Square

The members of the group use superhero-style names to hide their real identities. Initial Yarn Corps members were Deadly Knitshade, Knitting Ninja, Lady Loop, Shorn-a the Dead, Bluestocking Stitching and The Purple Purl, with the addition of The Fastener in October 2009.

In creating the group's identity, Knitshade also coined the term 'yarnstorming' as a less violent alternative to the US term yarnbombing. The term has now been adopted by many groups, and was first used in the media on BBC News in June 2009.

Deadly Knitshade is widely credited with innovating the concept of telling 'stitched stories' in graffiti knitting and crochet, using amigurumi knitted and crocheted characters, creatures and objects. The earliest recorded example of this is Knit the City's "Web of Woe" installation in August 2009, which was installed in London's Leake Street. The concept has since been adopted by groups worldwide and made national news.

In late August 2009 the group became the first graffiti knitting collective to publicise a 'live yarnstorm' on the Twitter social network, involving the six churches of the Oranges and Lemons nursery rhyme and publishing images of their six-hour "Oranges and Lemons Odyssey" installation in real time.

In late 2010 three members (Bluestocking, Ninja and Purler) left the group and Knit the City continued as a foursome. Their work was highlighted by 'The Graffiti Knitting Epidemic' interview with Knitshade, published in The Guardian newspaper, and an appearance ITV's This Morning.

In April 2011 Knit the City yarnstormed in Berlin to launch the German edition of their book, Knit the City: Maschenhaft Seltsames by Deadly Knitshade (published by Hoffmann und Campe).

The UK version of the book Knit the City: A Whodunnknit Set in London by Deadly Knitshade was released in the UK in September 2011 (published by Summersdale).

== Art ==
Installing their fibre art in broad daylight in busy public areas, Knit the City add a paper or fabric tag onto each work, bearing the logo and website address and the phrase "Confess your theft". They encourage members of the public to take their items.

They began their work with a simple 'cosy', a wooden barrier in London's Covent Garden before going on to make their most well-known piece, the Phonebox Cosy, a handknitted cosy made to fit a telephone box in London's Parliament Square while leaving the phonebox usable.

From here pieces developed into 'stitched stories' beginning with the "Web of Woe", a 13-foot spider web, complete with spider and victims, in London's Leake Street, Twitter's first live yarnstorm involving the six churches of the Oranges and Lemons nursery rhyme, a Wall of Wonderland outside the South Bank's IMAX to celebrate Tim Burton's Alice in Wonderland remake, a ballerina statue at the Royal Opera House covered in characters from the Nutcracker Suite, and a string of knitted hearts which they hung from the statue's bow in Piccadilly Circus seven metres high.

The artists have also shown work at Tate Britain and have taken part in art projects outside the UK. They have also been commissioned to produce installations by knitwear design company John Smedley at their flagship store and computer-games giant Nintendo.
