= Paul Kuniholm Pauper =

Paul Kuniholm
- Born: 22 December 1960 (age 65); Seattle, Washington, US
- Education: Vashon High School (diploma and training in Ironworking); University of Washington (BA); University of Washington (PBD Fiber Arts)
- Known for: Visual communication Mural; Sculpture; Word art Ambient music
- Partner: Stella
- Awards: People's Choice Award Newport Beach; Seattle Department of Transportation 2018 Parking Day Pavement Upcycle Award; Storefronts Seattle; Artist Trust Grant

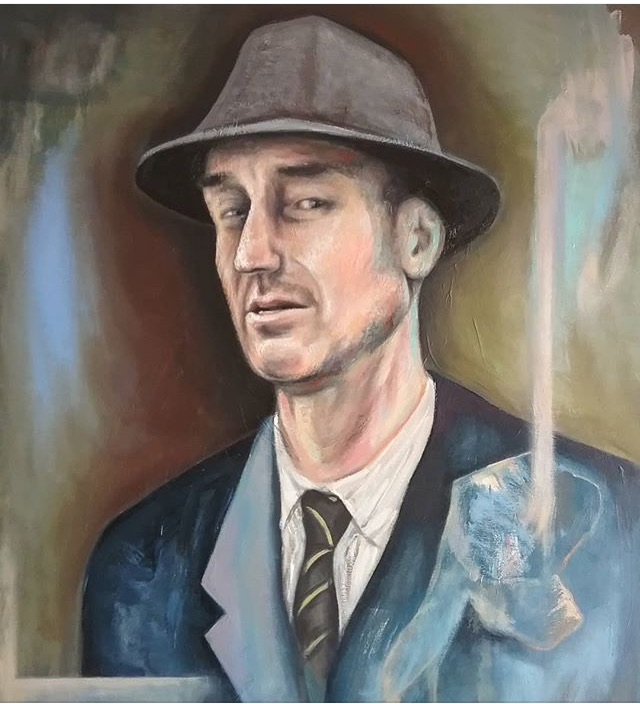
Paul Kuniholm, b.1960, portrait by Shannon McConnell, 2014

Ames-Trapezoid-Illusion-Sculpture-by-Paul-Kuniholm

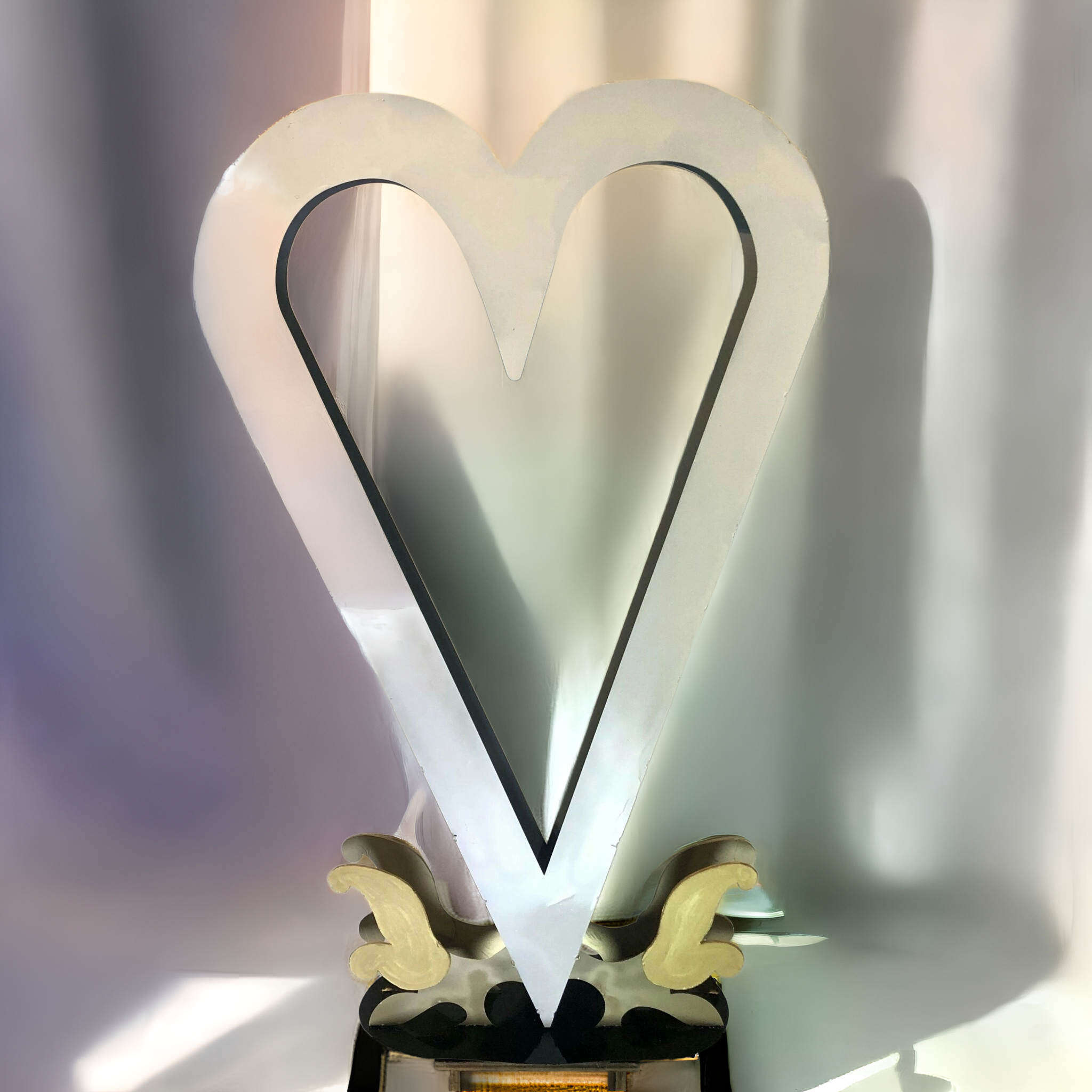
KUNIHOLMsculpture

Paul Kuniholm is a heritage-narrative public artist who creates art embodying sculptural objects, sculpture both fugitive and durable, art using digital material, wearable art intervention, video, mural art, and various time-based artwork that is exhibited in the public right-of-way, museums and other cultural venues internationally.
