= Yarn bombing =

Type of graffiti or street art

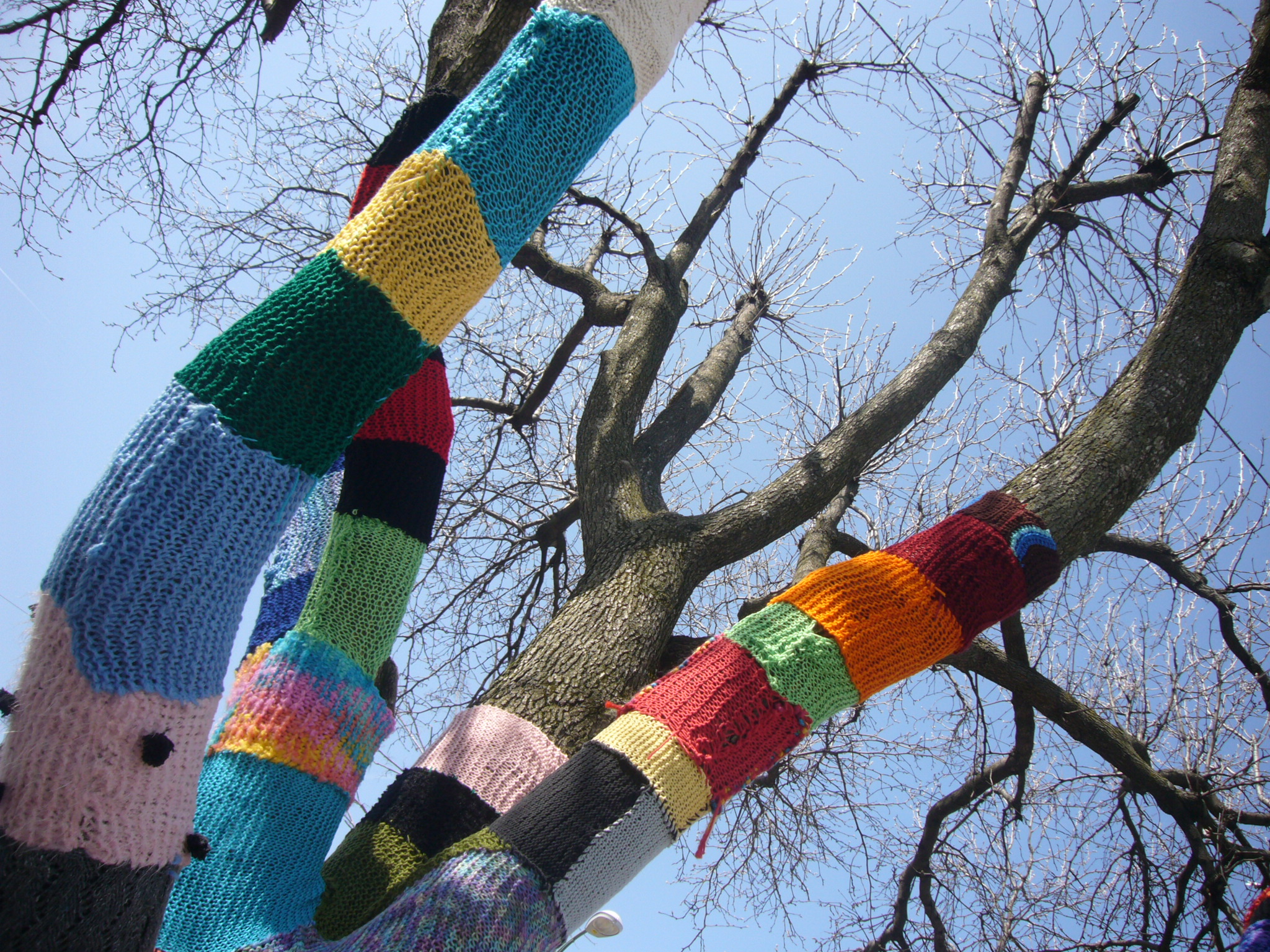
The Knit Knot Tree in Yellow Springs, Ohio

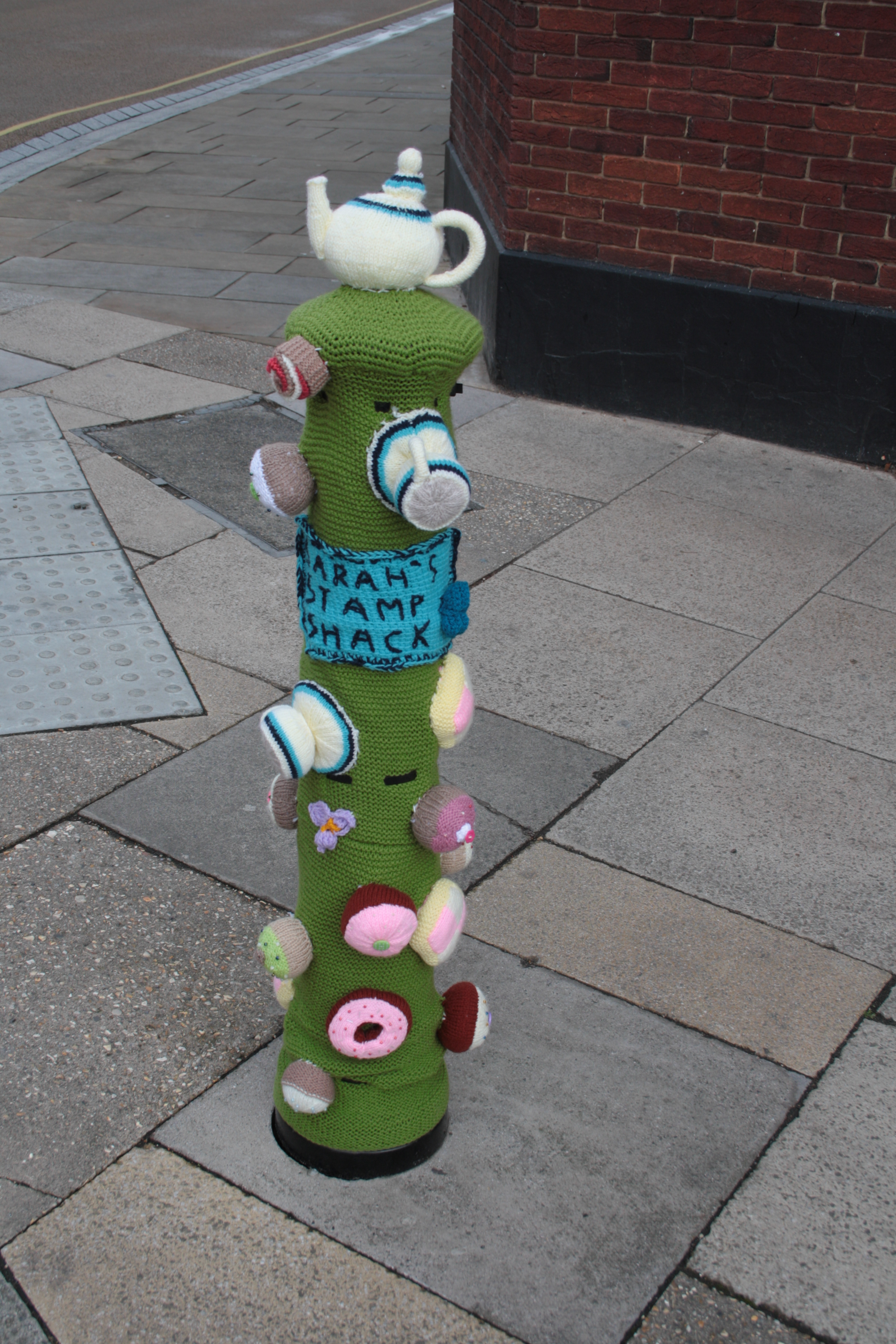
Yarn bombing for a town festival in Romsey, Hampshire, England

Yarn bombing (or yarnbombing) is a type of graffiti or street art that employs colorful displays of knitted or crocheted yarn or fibre rather than paint or chalk. It is also called wool bombing, yarn storming, guerrilla knitting, kniffiti, urban knitting, or graffiti knitting.

== Motivation ==
While other forms of graffiti may be expressive, decorative, territorial, socio-political commentary, advertising or vandalism, yarn bombing was initially almost exclusively about reclaiming and personalizing sterile or cold public places. It has since developed with groups graffiti knitting and crocheting worldwide, each with their own agendas and public graffiti knitting projects being run.

According to Manuela Farinosi and Leopoldina Fortunati, yarn bombing has become synonymous with the current feminist movement due in part to the reclamation of the traditionally feminine arts of knitting and crocheting to partake in the traditionally masculine and male-dominated graffiti scene. The women and girls who make up the yarn bombing subculture are diverse in race, age, sexuality, class, etc., and create space for themselves and their art everywhere from college campuses to public parks. This creation and preservation of space is what motivates some of the participants, some of whom have never been able to access a political art space before. In her article about yarn bombing, Joanna Mann explains the balance between the art and politics, "Yarn bombing, I argue, does more than feminise the city, for the whimsy with which it is imbued has the capacity to increase our attentiveness to habitual worlds in a series of micro-political gestures." McGovern finds that yarn bombing may also be used to contradict the idea of women as homemaker by bringing such traditionally feminine art into public space.

== History ==
The practice is believed to have originated in the U.S. with Texas knitters trying to find a creative way to use their leftover and unfinished knitting projects, but it has since spread worldwide.

The start of this movement has been attributed to Magda Sayeg, from Houston, who says she first got the idea in 2005 when she covered the door handle of her boutique with a custom-made cozy.

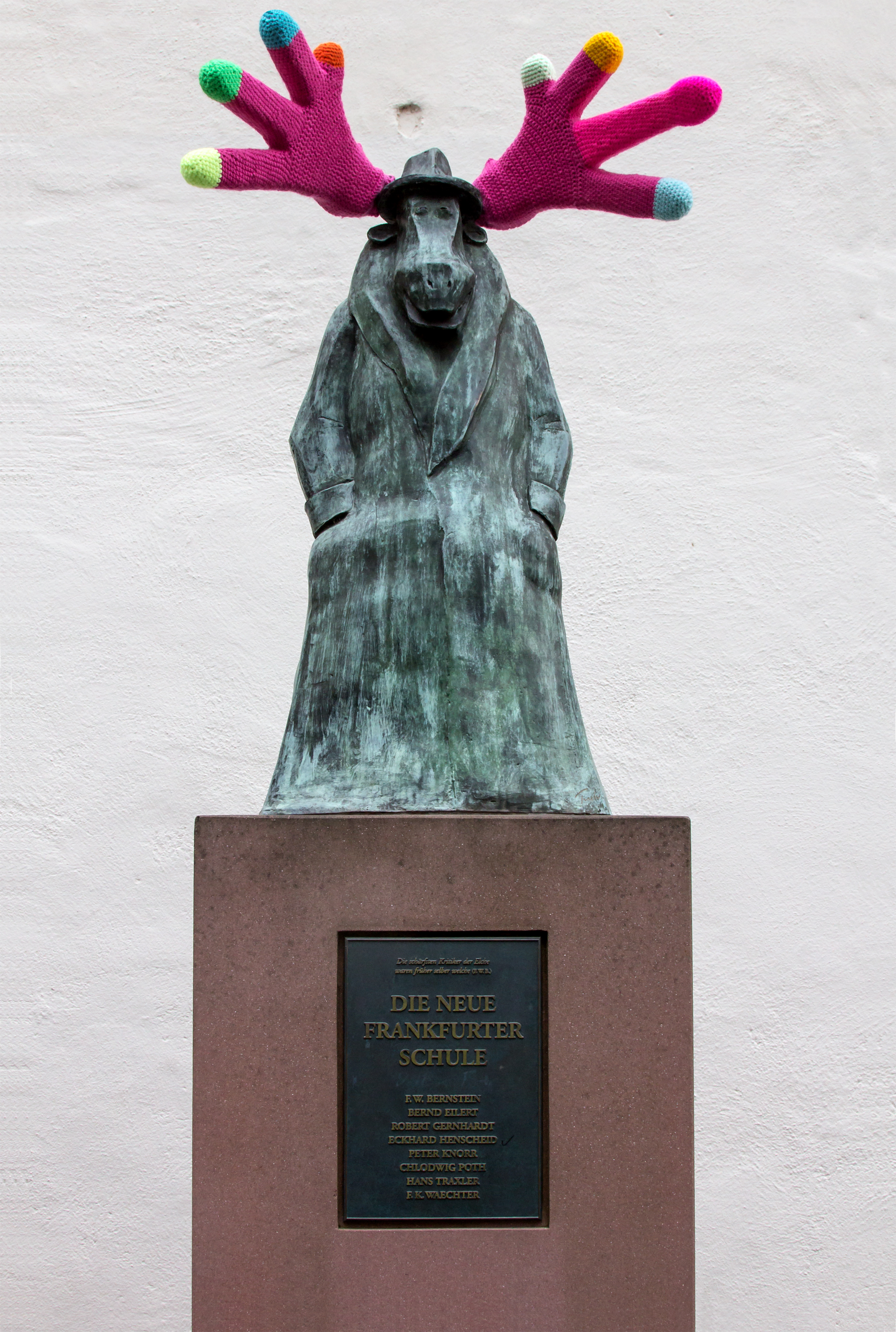
Moose, Museum of comic art, Frankfurt

Houston artist Bill Davenport was creating and exhibiting crochet-covered objects in Houston in the 1990s, and the Houston Press stated that "Bill Davenport could be called the grand old man of Houston crocheted sculpture." Artist Shanon Schollian was knitting stump cozies in 2002 for clear cuts in Oregon. The Knit Knot Tree by the Jafagirls in Yellow Springs, Ohio, gained international attention in 2008.

The movement moved on from simple 'cozies' with the innovation of the 'stitched story'. The concept has been attributed to Lauren O'Farrell (who creates her street art under the graffiti knitting name Deadly Knitshade), from London, UK, who founded the city's first graffiti knitting collective Knit the City. The 'stitched story concept' uses handmade amigurumi creatures, characters, and items to tell a narrative or show a theme. This was first recorded with the Knit the City collective's "Web of Woe" installation in August 2009.

The Knit the City collective were also the first to use O'Farrell's term yarnstorming to describe their graffiti knitting, as an alternative to the more popular term yarnbombing.

Yarn bombing's popularity has spread throughout the world. In Oklahoma City the Collected Thread store yarn bombed the Plaza District of the city on 9 September 2011 to celebrate their three-year anniversary as a functioning shop. and in Australia a group called the Twilight Taggers refer to themselves as 'fibre artists'. Joann Matvichuk of Lethbridge, Alberta founded International Yarnbombing Day, which was first observed on 11 June 2011.

Although yarnbomb installations are typically found in urban areas, Stephen Duneier, aka Yarnbomber, was the first to introduce it into the wilderness with numerous permitted projects in Los Padres National Forest beginning in 2012.

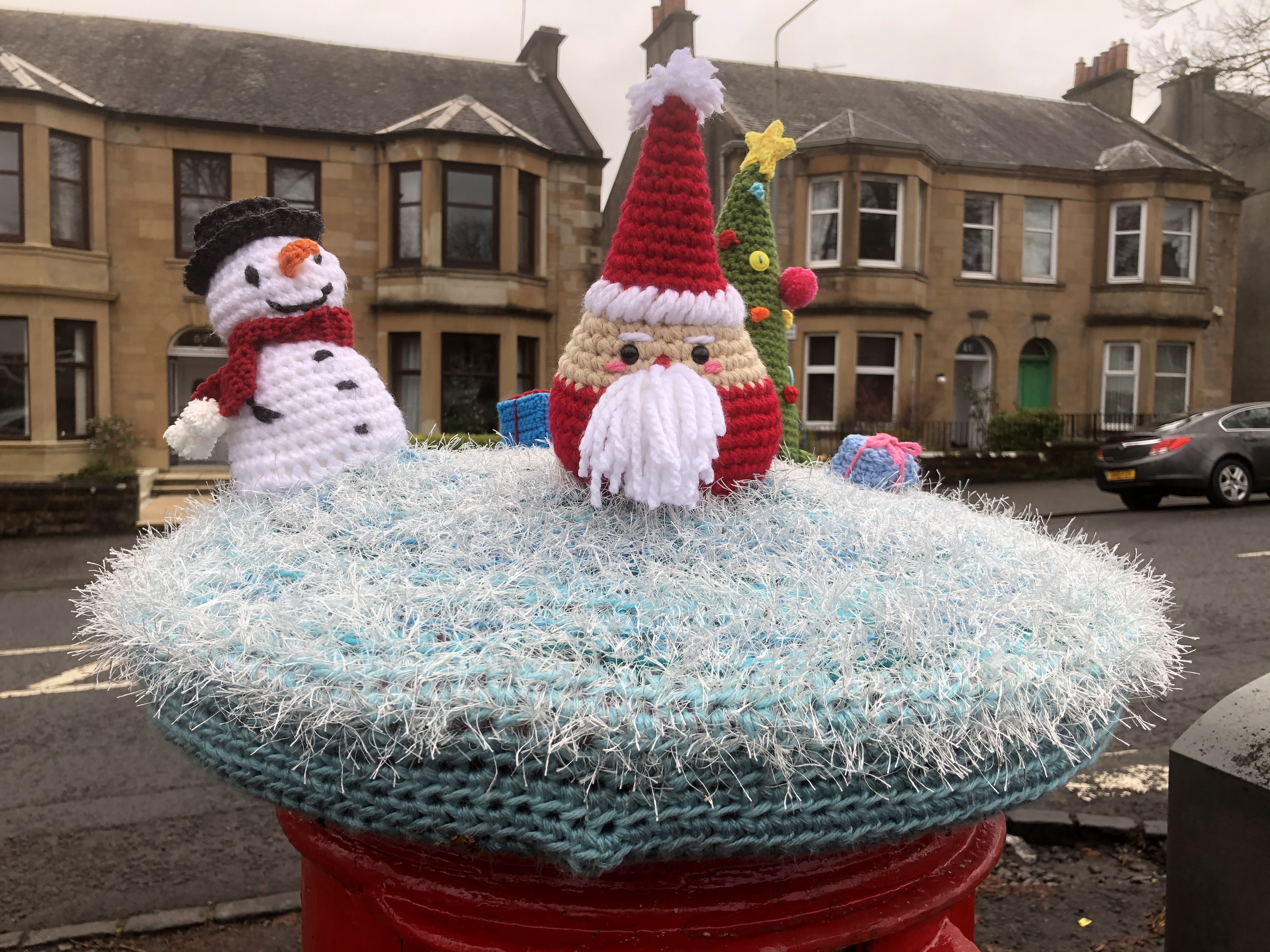
Festive postbox yarnbomb

The Craft Club Yarnbombers (Emma Curley, Helen Thomas, Gabby Atkins, Claire Whitehead and Rebecca Burton) in Essex became Guinness World Record holders in 2014 for the largest display of crochet sculptures, when they yarnbombed a children's hospice with 13,388 crocheted items. (The record has since been broken, in 2018 by a feminist crochet group based in India.) That December, they brought yarnbombing to their community with their postbox yarnbombs.

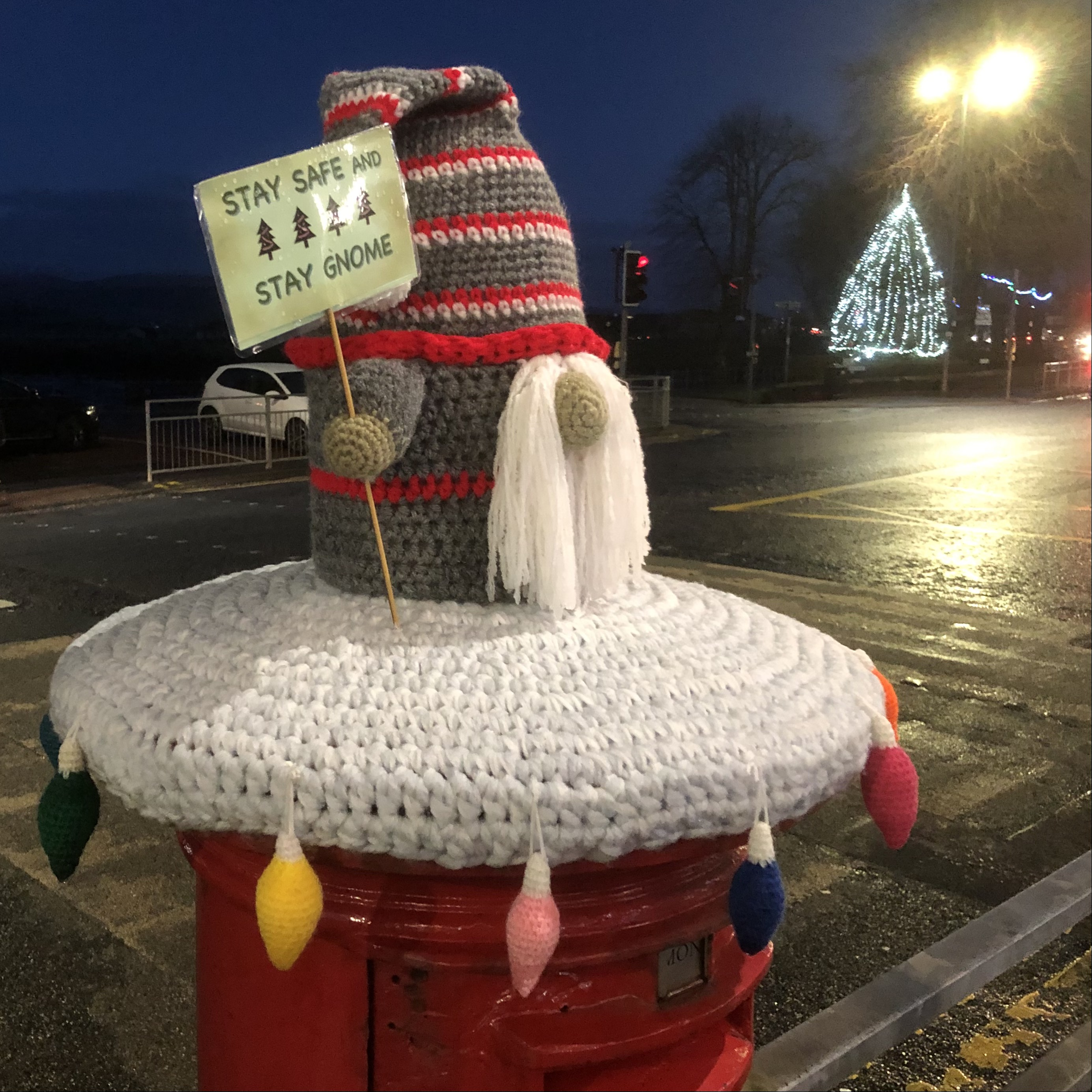
Inverclyde pillarbox yarnbombing

Yarn Bombing Los Angeles (YBLA) is a yarn bombing collective located in Los Angeles, California. The collective describe themselves as a group of guerrilla knitters who have been collaborating since 2010. They hold monthly meetings to develop plans for events, share techniques, develop their collective community, etc.

In Inverclyde, "The Wee Crafty Yarnbombers" bollard covers in 2019 were followed by pillarbox yarnbombing by FiddlieDee Crafts in the 2020 festive season.

In February 2024, activists in Montrose, Texas protested city plans to remove mature oak trees lining Montrose Boulevard by wrapping the trees in knitted and crocheted yarn graffiti.

== Legality ==
While yarn installations – called yarn bombs or yarnstorms – may last for years, they are considered non-permanent, and, unlike other forms of graffiti, can be easily removed if necessary. Nonetheless, the practice is still technically illegal in some jurisdictions, though it is not often prosecuted vigorously. Alyce McGovern highlights that a possible reason for this is that yarn bombing is often done by white middle-class women and it is seen as harmless fun; it is deemed more as street art and less as graffiti (which is enforced much more strictly).

== Criticisms ==
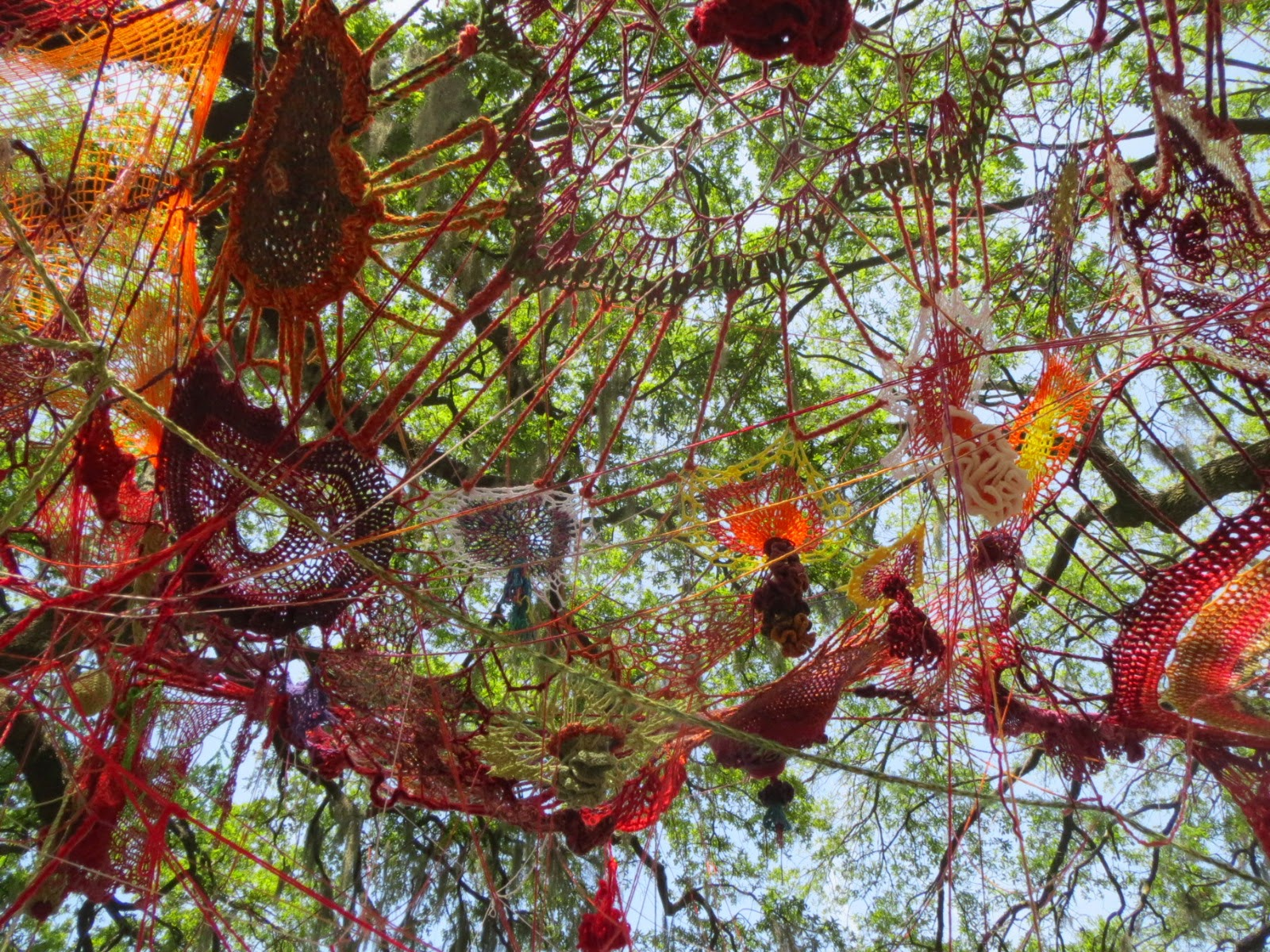
Yarn bombing in and between tree branches

Yarn bombing has been under some scrutiny for the potential negative environmental impact that the yarn can have when placed on plant life. Yarn can restrict sap production on trees and constrict growth. The knitted material requires removal and cleaning up; if left behind, installations become soggy and any synthetic fibers litter the environment.

The street artist Olek (Agata Oleksiak) has yarn bombed New York City icons such as the Wall Street bull and the Astor Place Cube. They faced legal trouble after their unauthorized installation in an underwater museum allegedly damaged marine life, the very cause they were attempting to raise awareness for. Olek also makes public statements with their work, such as blanketing a women's homeless shelter in Delhi in 2015 or installing an underwater cozy at the Cancun Underwater Museum.

By demonstrating on yarnbombed tricycles, the Knit Your Revolt Tricycle Gang in Queensland protests "anti-bikie" laws that outlaw motorcycle gangs.

Advertising campaigns have capitalized on the yarnbombing trend: Knit the City was commissioned by Toyota to create a 2013 installation in London. London Kaye creates yarnbomb graffiti and, in addition to her art installations, creates advertisement yarnbombs for brands like Valentino and Miller Lite. Kaye has received backlash for her installations when they are hung in public unauthorized, and one installation in Bushwick called "Moonshine Kingdom" was met with arguments that spray graffiti is prosecuted as illicit, while white trendy yarn graffiti is not criminalized. Public outcry concerning the installation labeled this type of graffiti a symbol of gentrification, although an article by The New York Times claims a double standard in criticism of yarnbombing, and that women's work is seen as "cutesy" and inherently less valuable.

== See also ==
- Craftivism
- Feminist art movement
- Fiber art
- Glossary of graffiti
- Knitta Please
- Lock On (street art)
- Rock balancing
- Urban interventionism
