= Knitta Please =

American textile art group

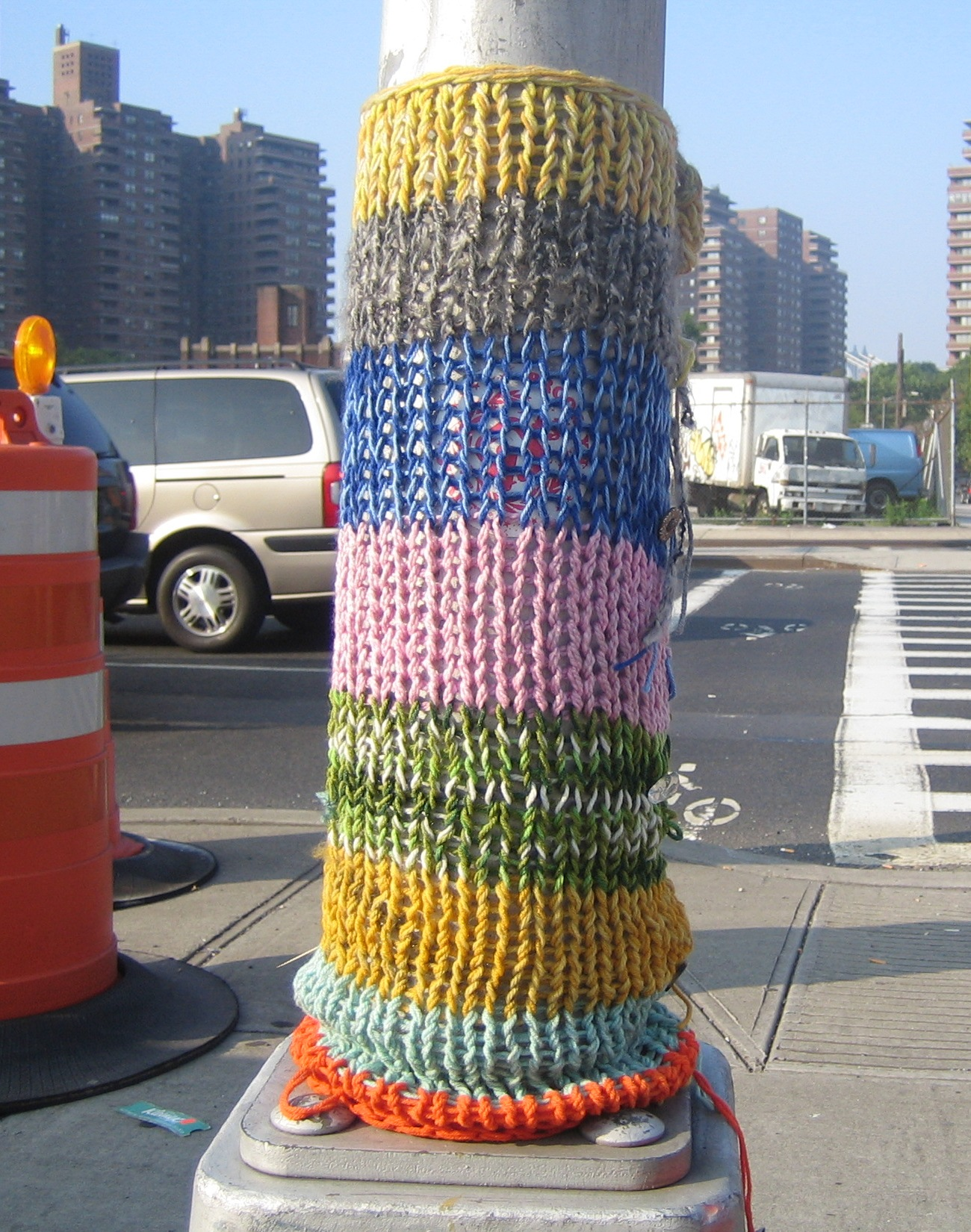
Utility pole warmer on New York City street corner.

Knitta, also known as Knitta Please, was a group of artists based in Houston, Texas often attributed with the creation of the yarn bombing movement, a type of graffiti where participants wrap public architecture—e.g. lampposts, parking meters, telephone poles, and signage—with knitted or crocheted material. Founded in 2005 by Magda Sayeg and Akrylik, the group held yarn bombings in several cities and continents, and were invited to stage installations

Knitta grew to eleven members by the end of 2007, and over the next several years held installations in several countries and on multiple continents. However, by the 2010s, membership had dwindled to just Sayeg.

== History ==
The group was founded in October 2005 by Magda Sayeg, also known as PolyCotN, alongside her anonymous friend AKrylik. Sayeg knit the first piece, a blue and pink acrylic square around the handle of her Houston boutique, It was received positively by a passerby, so Sayeg and AKrylik decided to turn their unfinished projects and stash into art that they saw as a response to the "dehumanizing qualities of the urban environment". They and eight other knitters formed the first knit graffiti crew and began tagging various parts of the Houston cityscape, including trees, stop signs, and especially car antennas with knitting and crocheting. This process would become known as yarn bombing and its creation is often attributed to Sayeg and Knitta.

The group named themselves Knitta, in reference to the phrase nigga please (converted to "Knitta, Please" as their tagline), as used in the songs by Ol' Dirty Bastard and Jay-Z. Members remained anonymous, giving themselves knitting-themed nicknames reminiscent of hip-hop and gangsta rap, such as Knotorious N.I.T., SonOfaStitch and P-Knitty. Images of their work spread online, leading to increased attention. Though received positively, some newspapers articles de-emphasized the political or artistic nature of their knitting. Some articles instead chose to focus on the member's appearances and families. Conversely, the group's name itself was debated by knitters, especially knitters of colour, some of whom felt that the group's name represented racism and was exclusionary of non-white knitters.

At one point, the group had as many as twelve official members, with copycats in several regions of the world. However, during the 2010s, membership in Knitta had shrunk back to just Sayeg. Sayeg, at this point, had become a full time knitter and artist who ran a blog under the name Knitta Please.

== Art ==
Usually tagging on Friday nights and Sunday mornings, Knitta taggers would leave a paper tag on each work, bearing the slogan "knitta please" or "whaddup knitta?". They tagged trees, lamp posts, railings, fire hydrants, monuments and other urban targets. The crew would mark holidays by doing themed work, using, for example, pink yarn for Valentine's Day pieces and sparkly yarn for New Years. When Knitta was not working with a theme, they would work on projects, tagging specific targets or specific areas. The group and their followers considered their graffiti to be a statement against the unfeeling cityscape. The illegal nature of graffiti in some US jurisdictions prompted police curiosity. Sayeg initially feared that the group would receive pushback from those whose work it tagged, though in 2011 noted that "the very people [she] feared[she] would get in trouble with" had begun inviting her to set up yarn bombing installations on their property.

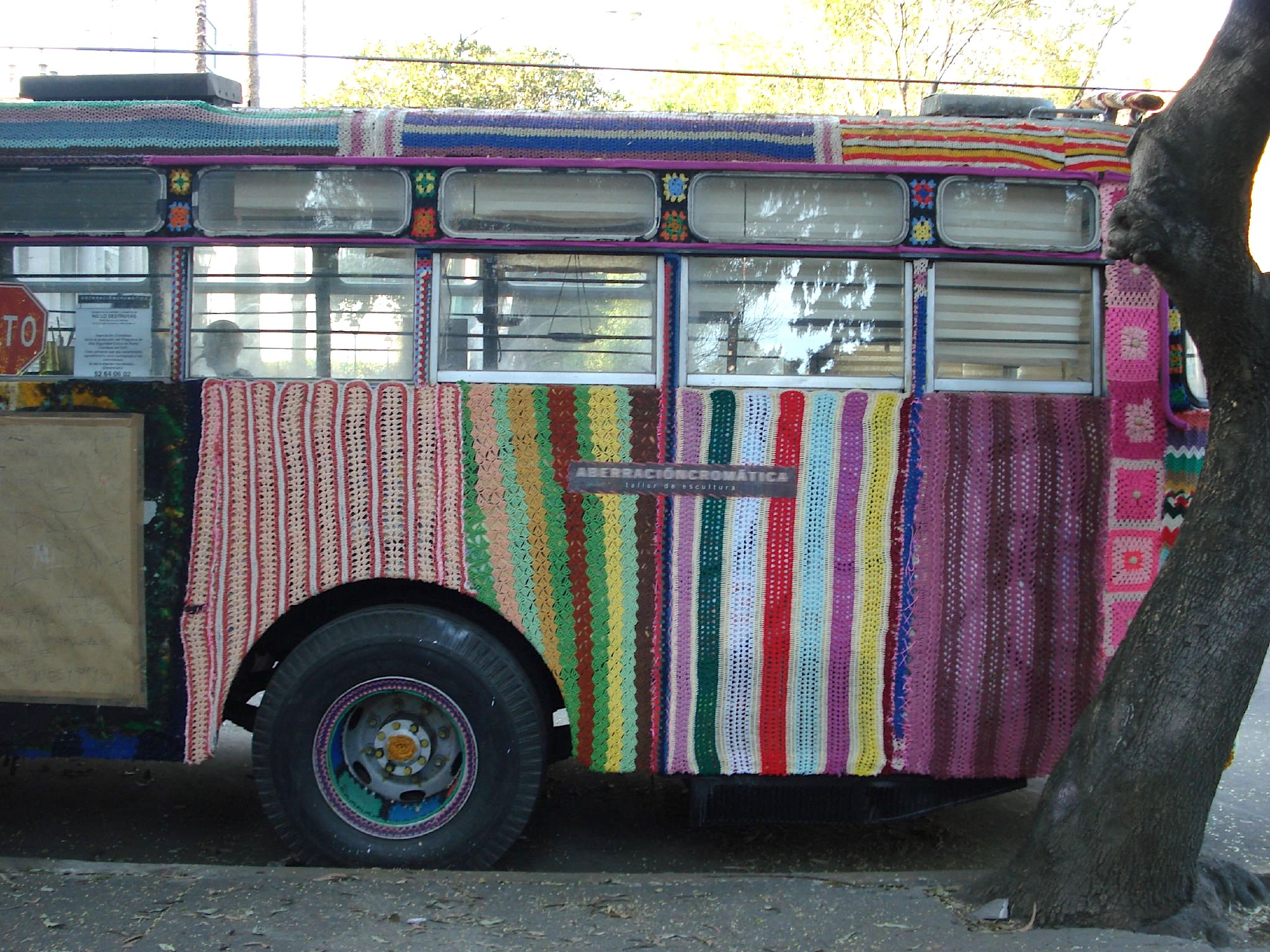
Portion of an old trolleybus in Mexico City covered in crocheting by a Knitta Please crew, 2008

In 2006, the group decided to visit Seattle, where they did their first large scale piece. Using more than 50 feet (15 m) of knitted material donated by volunteers of the crew's mailing list, they wrapped the top half of a Seattle monorail column. For another large project, the group tagged all 25 trees in the median of Allen Parkway in Houston for the annual Art Car parade in May 2006, wrapping them in blankets measuring two feet tall by two and a half feet long. In 2011, they were invited to stage another installation in Texas, this time outside the Blanton Museum of Art near the capitol building. Again in the United States, the group and Saveg was paid by Etsy to yarnbom their officers in New York City.

The Knitta collective also worked internationally. To celebrate the 60th anniversary of Bergère de France, the first manufacturer of French yarn, the company invited Knitta to Paris in 2007. While there, they tagged the Notre Dame de Paris. They held installations in several other European countries, as well as in Australia, El Salvador, Canada, and, in Asia, on the Great Wall of China.
