= Amigurumi =

Japanese craft of knitting or crocheting small, stuffed yarn creatures

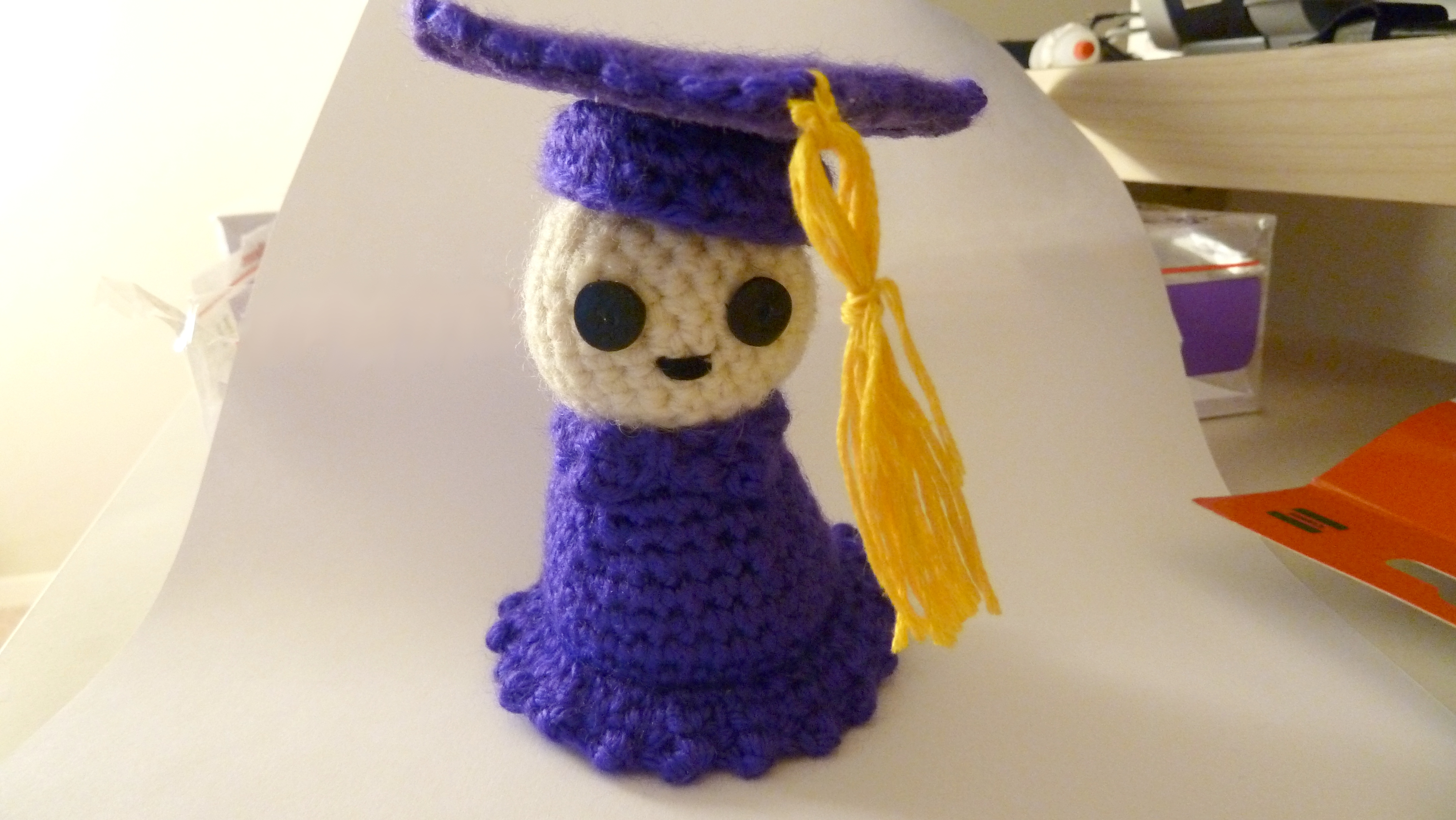
Amigurumi graduate in cap and gown

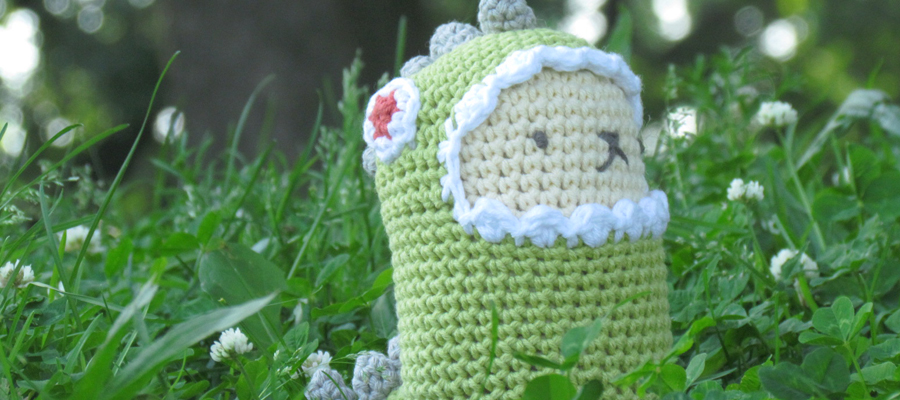
Amigurumi llama wearing a dinosaur costume in a field

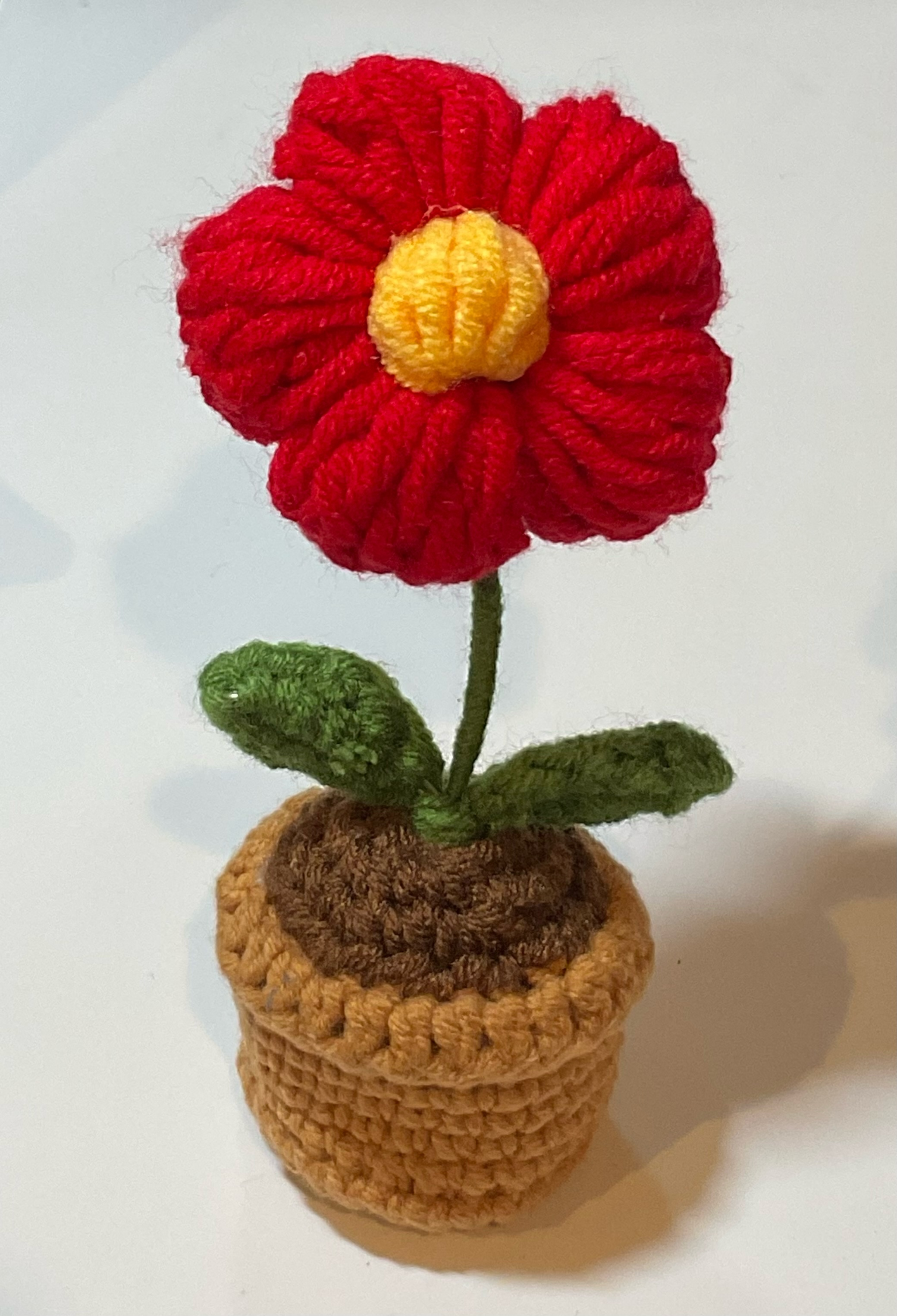
A red amigurumi flower inside a brown amigurumi pot

Amigurumi (Japanese: 編みぐるみ; lit. "crocheted or knitted stuffed toy") is the Japanese art of knitting or crocheting stuffed yarn creatures. The word is a compound of the Japanese words 編み ami, meaning "crocheted or knitted", and 包み kurumi, literally "wrapping", as in 縫い包み nuigurumi "(sewn) stuffed doll". Amigurumi vary in size and there are no restrictions about size or look. While the art of amigurumi has been known in Japan for several decades, it first gained widespread popularity in other countries, especially in the West, in 2003. By 2006, amigurumi were reported to be among the most popular items on Etsy, an online craft marketplace, where they typically sold between $10 and $100.

== Origins ==
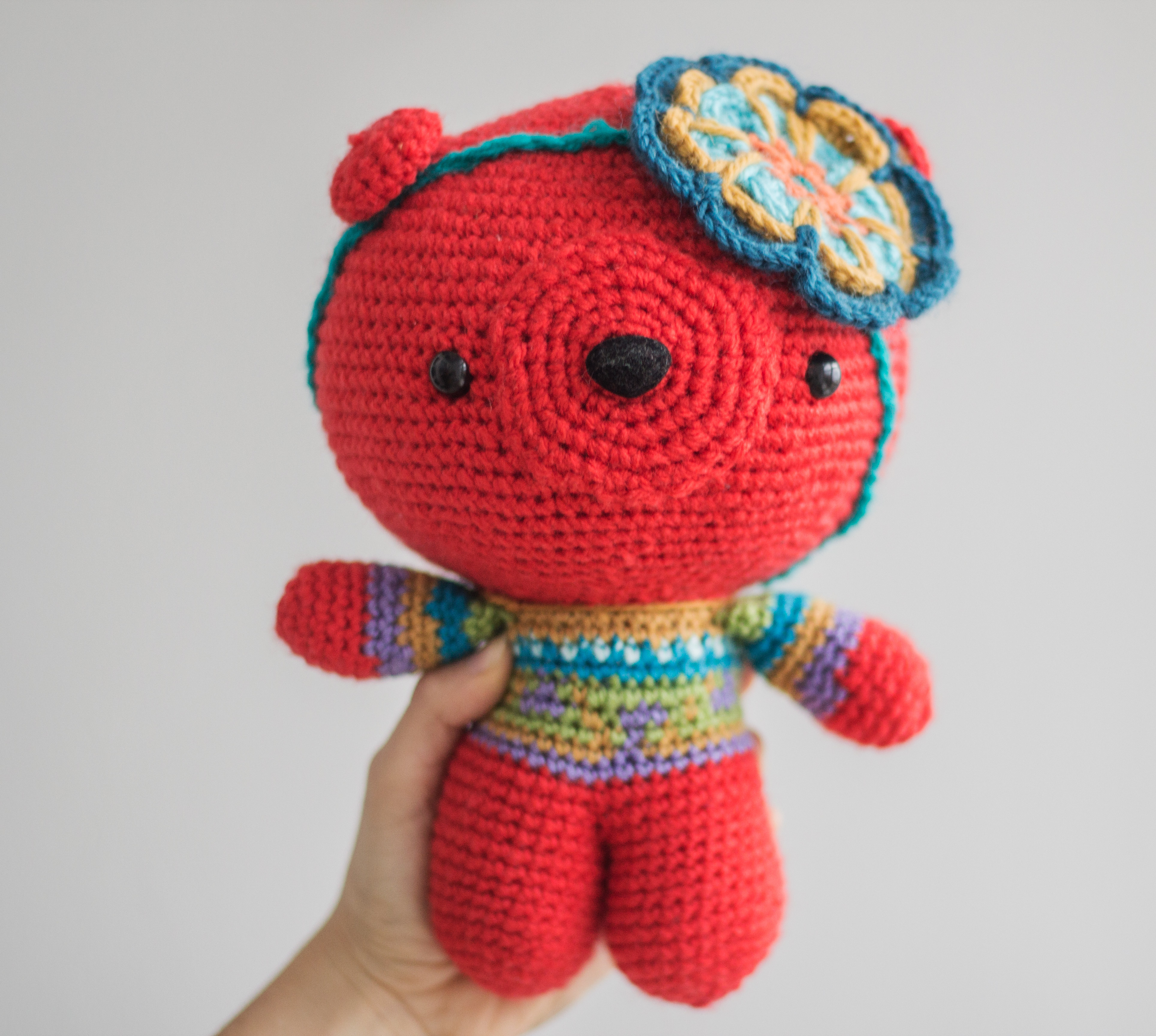
A large amigurumi bear

According to the Crochet Guild of America (CGOA), there are earlier records of crocheted or knitted dolls made in China; early examples include three-dimensional dolls worked in crochet.

According to Yoshihiro Matushita, there are records (dating from 1185) of analogous techniques in Japan, such as needle binding, a fabric creation technique predating knitting and crocheting. During the Edo period (1603–1867), Japan traded with the Dutch and, as a result, it is believed that knitting was introduced as a technique. Knitting evolved with the samurai, who were experts in creating garments and decorations for their katana and winter wear.

During the Meiji era (1868–1912), Japan transitioned from being a feudal society into a more modern model. It was also during that period that industrialization started in the country. The educational model was changed and thousands of students were sent abroad to learn practices from the West. More than 3,000 Westerners were hired to teach modern science, mathematics, technology, and foreign languages in Japan.

According to Dai Watanabe, "Women were invited to teach western needleworks during that time." She also identifies the first stuffed crocheted motif, Seiyo-keito-amimono-kyouju (西洋毛糸編物教授), a twigged loquat with a leaf and more fruit motifs, which started appearing in 1920.

== Aesthetic ==
Cute amigurumi are the most aesthetically popular (see kawaii and chibi for more relevant cultural details). Amigurumi may be used as children's toys but are generally purchased or made solely for aesthetic purposes. Although amigurumi originated in Japan, the craft has become popular around the world.

== Technique ==
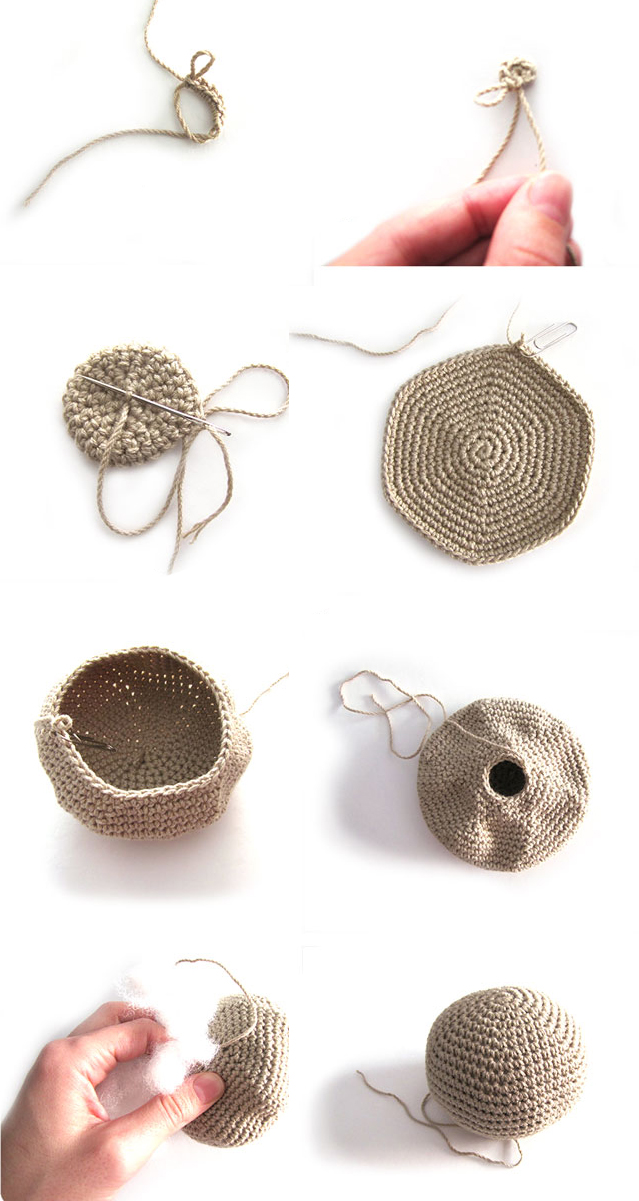
Step-by-step production of a basic amigurumi using the spiral crochet method

Amigurumi can be knitted, though they are usually crocheted out of yarn or thread, using the basic techniques of crochet (such as single crochet stitch, double crochet, and invisible decrease). Amigurumi can be worked as one piece or, more usually, in sections which are sewed or crocheted together. In crochet, amigurumi are typically worked in spiral rounds to prevent "striping", a typical feature of joining crochet rounds in a project.

Small gauge crochet hooks or knitting needles are typically used to achieve a tight gauge that does not allow the stuffing to show through the fabric. Stuffing can be standard polyester, wool, or cotton craft stuffing, but may be improvised from other materials. Wires, such as pipe cleaners or floral wire, may be used to make the doll posable. Plastic pellets, glass pebbles, and even stones may be inserted beneath the stuffing to distribute weight at the bottom of the figure.

== Sources ==
- Ramirez Saldarriaga, Jennifer (2016). Amigurumi (Thesis). Helsinki, Finland: Aalto University.
