= Yarn weight =

Measurement of yarn thickness

Yarn weight refers to the thickness of yarn used by craft knitters, weavers, crocheters and other fiber artists.

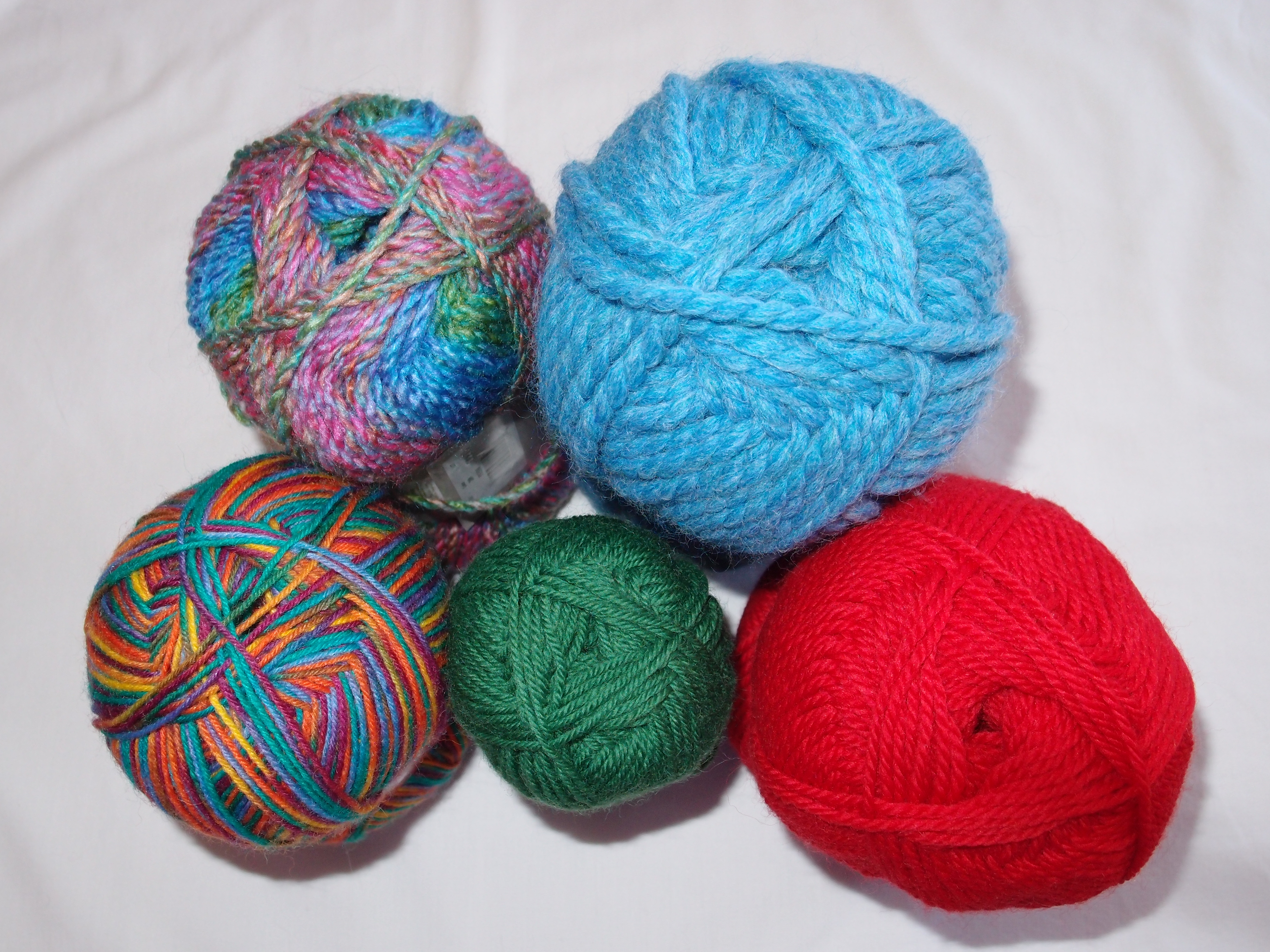
Different yarn weights. From left to right: Top row - Chunky, super bulky. Bottom row - Fingering, sport, worsted.

== Importance ==
Changing yarn weight or needle size can have a significant impact on the finished project, so standardized systems have been spread about, as well as conversion systems for regional standards (especially needle sizes).

Yarn weight is important in achieving the correct gauge or tension for a particular project and can help with yarn substitution. The Craft Yarn Council of America has developed a system that seeks to standardize the labeled weights of yarn. Most yarns state their weight on the ball band but some may not, only giving the composition. Some brands use a standardized numbering system that uses seven ranges of relative thickness of yarn. However there are methods for individuals to gauge weight for themselves.

== Wrap, method ==
A way of determining the weight of an unknown yarn is to use the wrapping method. This method is also used to calculate the amount of yarn needed for a project. By this method it is possible to check an unknown weight of yarn with a regular pencil and ruler without unwinding the yarn. Simply slip the pencil under approximately an inch of the strands and count the number of strands.

Wrap the yarn around a large needle or a ruler. Make sure the yarn lies flat. Push the yarn together so there are no gaps between wraps. Smooth it out so it is neither too loose nor too tight. Measure the number of wraps per inch (2.5 cm). For better accuracy, measure the wraps at the center of your yarn sample.

The number of wraps will act as a gauge to assess the thickness of unmarked yarn; for example 12 wraps per inch is 12 WPI, and is used to calculate how much yarn is required for various articles, so that 12 is equivalent to 8 ply (worsted weight, medium weight) yarn.

== Swatch methods ==
A more hands-on method, there is the test swatch and the gauge swatch. Knitting a test swatch requires knitting the yarn into a small, roughly 4 in (10 cm) square textile of even stitches. Comparing this with recommended needle sizes, yarn, and the knitter's own signature tension, allows for adjustments to all of these things. For example, changing needle size is one way to bring the test swatch nearer to an accurate measurement in yarn weight.

The gauge swatch goes further. Not only is it a tool for checking whether yarn conforms to a desired dimension, but it is usually produced with some of the complexities of the intended project (i.e. multiple colors, varied stitches, edgings) making it a much larger test piece. This larger sample is then "dressed" meaning washed, ironed, and subjected to other processes expected of the finished item. It is especially used for items that require a lot of work and time, to avoid dimensional mistakes in the long run.

== International standard weights ==
Below is a table comparing yarn weights in a range of places:

International standard yarn weight system
USA	UK	Australia	Germany	m/100g	Wraps per Inch	Recommended knitting needle size, mm	Recommended crochet hook size, mm	Other names used
0 or Lace	1 ply			More than 800	40+ wpi	1.5 - 2.5	1.5 - 2.5	Single, Cobweb, Thread, Zephyr
0 or Lace	2 ply		2 fädig (ply)	600-800	30-40 wpi	1.5 - 2.5	1.5 - 2.5	
1 or Super Fine	3 ply	3 ply	3 fädig	500-600	20-30 wpi	2 - 3	2.25 - 3.5	Light Fingering, Sock, Baby
1 or Super Fine	4 ply	4 ply	4 fädig	350-450	14-24 wpi	2 - 3	2.25 - 3.5	Fingering, Sock, Baby
2 or Fine		5 ply	6 fädig	250-350	12-18 wpi	3 - 4	3.5 - 4.5	Sport, Baby, 3-ply (obsolete American)
3 or Light	DK (Double Knit) or 8 ply	8 ply		200-250	11-15 wpi	4 - 4.5	4.5 - 5.5	Light Worsted, DK
4 or Medium	Worsted, Aran, Triple Knit (rare)	10 or 12 ply		120-200	9-12 wpi	4.5 - 5.5	5.5 - 6.5	Worsted, Afghan, Fisherman, 4-ply (obsolete American)
5 or Bulky	Chunky, Double Double Knit (rare)	12 or 16 ply		100-130	6-8 wpi	5.5 - 8	6.5 - 9	Craft, Rug
6 or Super Bulky	Super Chunky			Less than 100	5-6 wpi	>8	>9	Roving
7 or Jumbo				Less than 100	n/a	12.75 mm and larger	15 mm and larger	Roving

== Standardized yarn weight system ==
Standardized yarn weight system
Category name	Description	Crochet gauge (stitches per inch in single crochet)	Metric hook size	US hook size	Knitting gauge (number of stitches per four inches in stockinette)	Metric knitting needle size	US knitting needle size
Lace	fingering, crochet 10-count thread	33–40 sts	1.5–2.25 mm	B‑1	33–40 sts	1.5–2.25 mm	000–1
Super fine	sock, fingering, baby	21–32 sts	2.25–3.5 mm	B‑1 – E‑4	27–32 sts	2.25–3.25 mm	1–3
Fine	sport, baby	16–20 sts	3.5–4.5 mm	E‑4 – 7	23–26 sts	3.25–3.75 mm	3–5
Light	DK, light worsted	12–17 sts	4.5–5.5 mm	7 – I‑9	21–24 sts	3.75–4.5 mm	5–7
Medium	worsted, Afghan, Aran	11–14 sts	5.5–6.5 mm	I‑9 – K‑10 1/2	16–20 sts	4.5–5.5 mm	7–9
Bulky	chunky, craft, rug	8–11 sts	6.5–9 mm	K‑10 1/3 – M‑13	12–15 sts	5.5–8 mm	9–11
Super bulky	bulky, roving	5–9 sts	9–15 mm	M‑13 – Q	7–11 sts	8–12.75 mm	11–17
Jumbo	jumbo, roving	6 sts and fewer	15 mm and higher	Q and larger	6 sts and fewer	12.75 mm and higher	17+

== Fabric ==
Equations may be used to determine the weight of warp and weft required for a particular fabric:

- Weight of warp = (0.65 x qty. of fabric (metres) x no. of warp ends) / count

If there are two colors in the warp, use the following equations:

- Weight of color A (kg) = (0.65 x qty. of fabric (metres) x no. of warp ends of color A) / count of color A
- Weight of color B (kg) = (0.65 x Qty. of fabric (metres) x no. of warp ends of color B) / count of color B

If the counts of two warps are the same:

- Weight of color A (kg) = (total weight of warp reqd. x no. of ends of color A) / total no. of warp ends
- Weight of color B (kg) = (total weight of warp reqd. x no. of ends of color B) / total no. of warp ends

or

- Weight of color (B) = total weight of warp reqd. - weight of color A
- Weight of weft = (0.6 x qty. of fabric (metres) x PPI x reed space) / count

If there are two colors in the weft:

- Weight of color A (kg) = (0.6 x qty. of fabric (metres) x PPI of color A x reed space) / count of color A
- Weight of color B (kg) = (0.6 x qty. of fabric (metres) x PPI of color B x reed space) / count of color B

or

- Weight of color (B) = total weight of weft reqd. - weight of color A
- Another formula
1. Reed x width / 7000 = Ans

== See also ==
- List of yarns for crochet and knitting
