= Extreme cold weather clothing =

Clothing for arctic or high altitude conditions

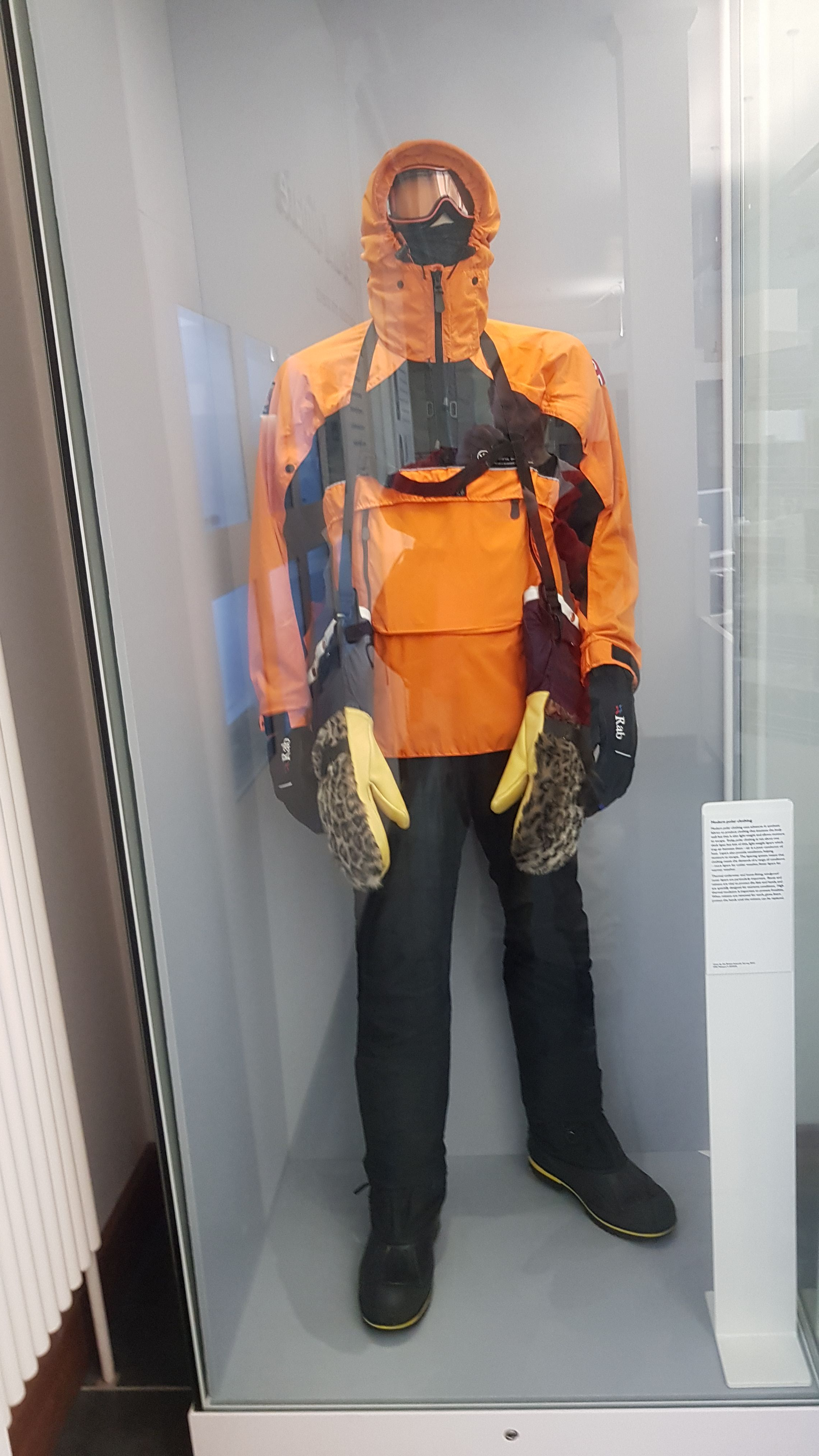
Antarctic clothing [ECW] used by the British Antarctic Survey in Antarctica

In arctic or mountainous areas, the primary function of extreme cold weather clothing is to trap air as an insulator to prevent heat loss from the wearer's body. Secondary and necessary is to conduct water vapor away from the body to keep the insulating layers dry. A shell keeps the wind from disturbing the still air in the insulating layers. In warmer conditions, the shell protects from water intrusion.

The U.S. National Weather Service defines extreme cold as −35 °F (−37 °C) with winds less than 5 miles per hour (2.2 m/s). In these conditions, the unprotected skin of a healthy adult will develop frostbite in ten to twenty minutes. The Canadian standard includes even lower temperatures.

== Principles ==
A vacuum is the best insulator, but its use in clothing is impractical. Dry air is a practical insulator. Extreme cold weather clothing uses still dry air to insulate the body, trapping air via layers of material. The inner layers should conduct moisture away from the body. Outer layers should be windproof as well as suitable to the harsh terrain.

== Materials ==
The original cold weather clothing was made of furs. The fibers of the fur trapped insulating air, lanolin on the fur repelled water. Knitted wool is an effective insulator when dry, but ineffective when wet. Goose down is the lightest insulator, and still used today. Its quality, called loft is a measure of its low density. It is ineffective when wet.

Artificial fibers have good loft, and do not lose it when wet. One effective fiber is Hollofil a hollow fiber of polyolefin. Outer garments are often made of nylon, which is strong and abrasion resistant. The nylon is often bonded to a layer of polytetrafluoroethylene (trade name Teflon) in a form that has holes small enough for moisture to escape, but not allow liquid water to intrude. This material is trade named Gore-Tex.

== Best practices ==
The U.S. Army describes cold weather best practices by the mnemonic acronym COLD.

- Clean
- Avoid Overheating
- Loose
- Dry

The protocol is aimed at keeping the insulation dry, so that it may be most effective.

== Layering ==
Best practice indicates that for extreme conditions, clothing should be layered and loose. Near the core of the body, a soft, wicking layer is best. Wool or silk underwear is preferred. Then, by preference, a knitted layer of wool or synthetic fleece. A massive insulating layer and a windproof layer complete the ensemble.

== Parts of clothing ==
=== Inner layer ===
Underwear, inner socks, and glove liners are typically thin, soft knits of silk, wool, or synthetic.

=== First insulating layer ===
Typically knit wool or synthetic fleece. A common material is polar fleece.

=== Massive insulating layer ===
Down or synthetic fiber sewn into bats of a (typically nylon) coat or pants.

=== Wind layer ===
The usual clothing for Arctic or mountain regions is a parka. A tightly woven fabric prevents wind from disturbing the still air in the insulating layers.

=== Footwear ===
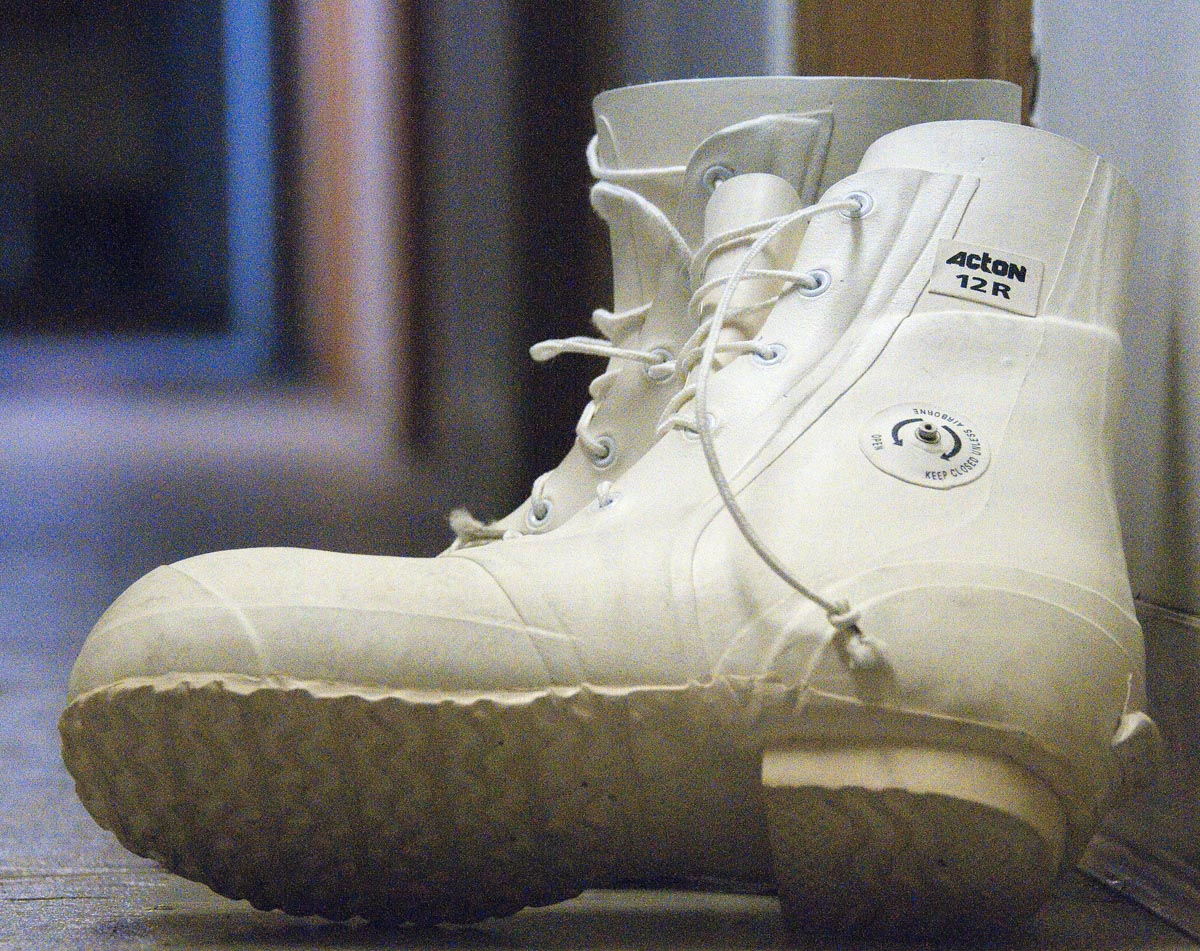
Example of Bunny boots.

Footwear is chosen according to purpose. In alpine conditions, insulated mountaineering boots are used. In other work conditions, pacs, or bunny boots, with rubber soles and thick, removable wool felt liners are used. In camp, lightweight moon boots of foam and nylon are common. In the tent, down booties are comfortable.

=== Gloves ===
In severe conditions, mittens with long gauntlets are preferred.

=== Headwear ===
A knitted or fleece cap is worn underneath the hood of the parka. The face is protected by a mask or balaclava. The water transmission properties of anything touching the face are of the highest concern.

Another option is to use heated clothing, which contains battery-powered electrical heating elements or gel packs.

== See also ==
- Sportswear, also known as activewear – Equipment and attire for physical activity
- Extended Cold Weather Clothing System – Protective clothing used by US Army
- Environmental suit – Clothing worn to protect a person in a hostile environment
