= Extended Cold Weather Clothing System =

Protective clothing used by US Army

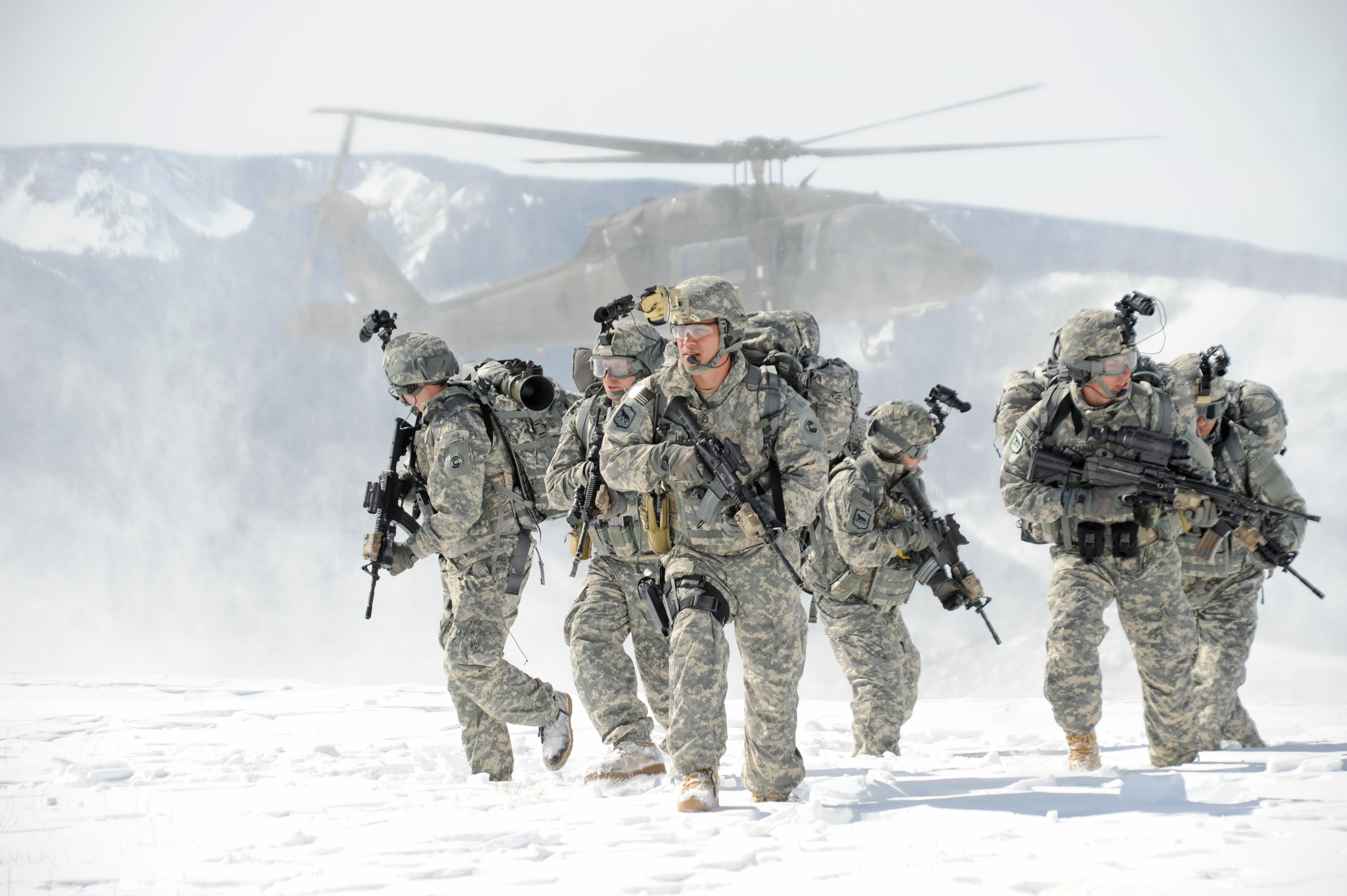
Generation III Extended Cold Weather Clothing System

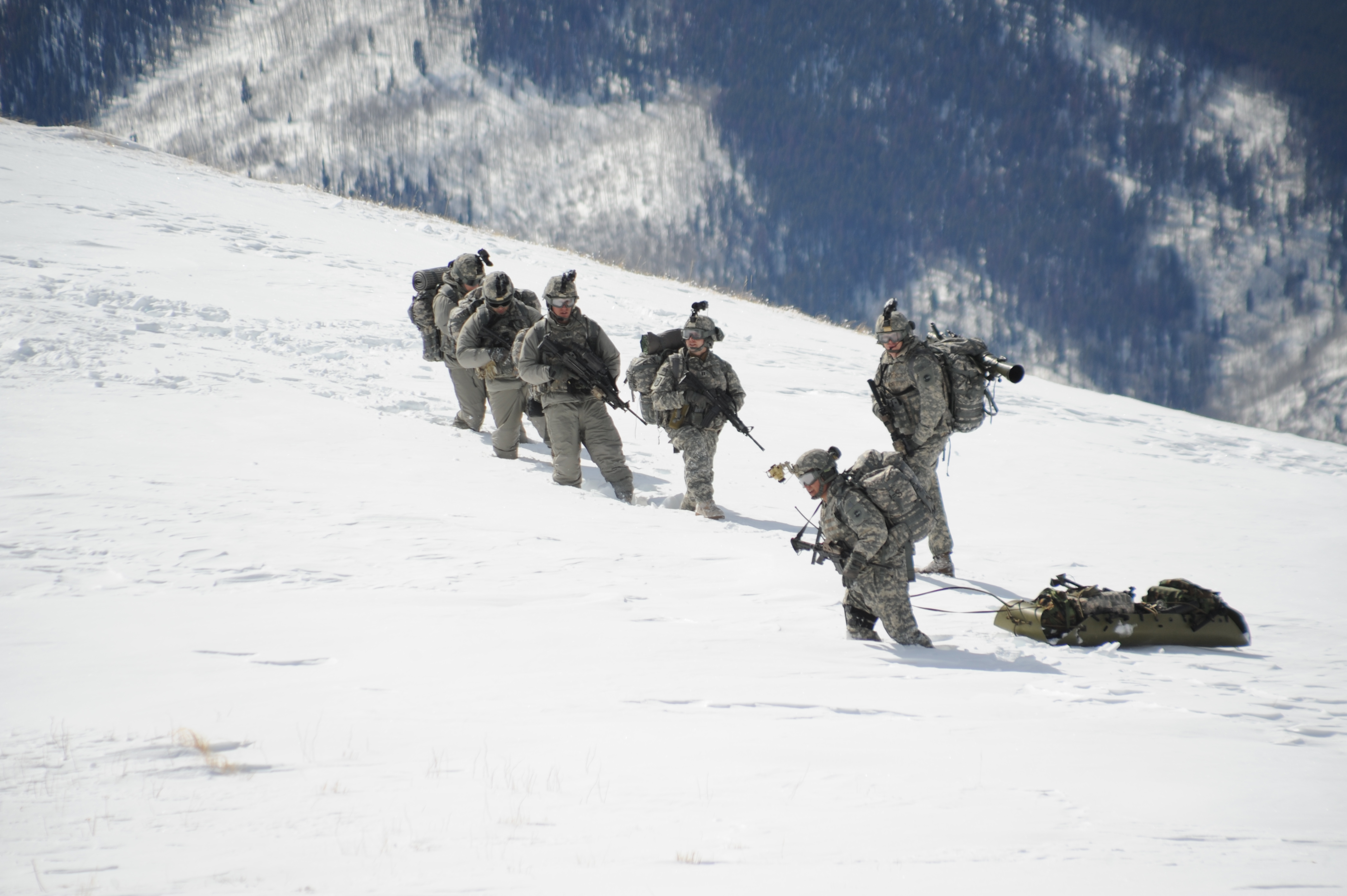
ECWCS levels 7 (left) and 5 (right)

The Extended Cold Weather Clothing System (ECWCS /ˈɛkwæks/) is a protective clothing system developed in the 1980s by the United States Army Natick Soldier Research, Development and Engineering Center, Natick, Massachusetts. The first generation ECWCS consisted of parka and trousers plus 20 other individual clothing, handwear, headwear and footwear items which are used in various combinations to meet the cold weather environmental requirements of the US military (and others). The Extended Climate Warfighter Clothing System, or Gen III ECWCS, is designed to maintain adequate environmental protection in temperatures ranging between −60 and +40 °F (−51 and 4 °C).

== History ==
In 1983, The U.S Department of Defense funded a three year development program. This was the start of ECWCS (Extended Cold-Weather Clothing System). In 1984, select units of the Marines, Navy Seals, and US Army were testing sample products in California, New York, and Italy.

The next year, a thousand marines were deployed on exercise to Europe and not a single one succumbed to a cold weather casualty.

With these kinds of results, and the rave reviews from British forces during the recent Falklands War, 10,000 yards was ordered and development of the ECWCS Parka began. The military garment contractor selected was Tennessee Apparel.

== 1st Generation ==
The entire ECWCS ensemble (1st generation) consists of:

1. undershirt, cold weather, polypropylene
2. [drawers], cold weather, polypropylene
3. shirt, cold weather, polyester fiberpile
4. overall, bib, cold weather, fiberpile
5. liner, cold weather trousers, field
6. liner, cold weather, coat, men's
7. trousers, cold weather, field, nylon and cotton
8. parka, extended cold weather, camouflage
9. trousers, extended cold weather, camouflage
10. parka/trousers, snow camouflage, white
11. glove inserts, cold weather
12. gloves, men's and women's, light duty
13. mitten inserts, cold weather, (trigger finger)
14. mitten shells, cold weather, (trigger finger)
15. mitten set, extreme cold weather
16. mitten shells, snow camouflage, cotton, white, two finger
17. cap, camouflage pattern
18. hood, balaclava
19. socks, men's, nylon, cushion sole, stretch type
20. boots, cold weather (Type I-black)
21. boots, extreme cold weather (Type II-white)
22. suspenders, trousers, M-1950

The system is to be used in an insulated, triple-layering fashion, with the polypropylene undergarments as Layer 1, the polyester shirt/bib, liners and cotton/nylon trousers as Layer 2, and Gore-Tex outer garments as Layer 3.

The parka and trousers (which have been adapted to the civilian outdoor clothing market) are themselves constructed in a three-layer fashion consisting of an outer layer of abrasion-resistant taslan nylon, an intermediate layer of durably waterproof, windproof, and Gore-Tex membrane (protected with a layer of nylon tricot and originally in a four-color camouflage print), and a hung inner layer of unlaminated nylon. The whole is seam-sealed.

=== The ECWCS parka ===
The parka – which is a particularly popular component – is characterized by a cobra hood (which fits over a combat helmet) with woven nylon drawstring adjustable pulls and an attachment piece that allows fastening of a fur ruff (early models of the parka lacked this attachment piece). There is a two-way, full-front slide fastener to provide full-face protection, leaving only the eyes uncovered. The parka has raglan shoulders/sleeves, a non-freezing, double-pull zipper with storm flap and seven snap closure, a flap-covered pocket on the left sleeve with hook and loop (Velcro) closure, adjustable hook and loop wrist cuffs, armpit ventilation zippers and double reinforced elbows. A badge/insignia tab with snap is located on the storm flap. There is an interior back ventilation opening, two slash (handwarmer) cargo pockets on the lower front (with extra large flaps and double hook and loop single snap closure on each) and an inside draft skirt (windskirt) with elastic drawcords and barrel-locks at the waist (without pulls). There are also two concealed map pockets at the front zipper with hook and loop closures that can be opened without unzipping the parka.

== 2nd Generation ==
In the early mid-1990s, The second generation (2G) ECWCS included a new ECWCS parka with flaps over and under the zipper, along with other areas that let in moisture. The helm and cuffs were treated with an anti-wicking material, to keep moisture from climbing up and into the parka. The ECWCS II Parka has a stow-able hood, but it lacks the liner that the Gen 1 had. The bare Gore-Tex material can be uncomfortable to some.

In addition, it featured two different layers made with Polartec fabrics: the Polartec Classic 300 shirt and the Polartec Classic 200 overalls. When used in combination with other layers in the ECWCS system, the system provides protection between −40 and +40 °F (−40 and 4 °C). The parka was improved by vents to help deal with the condensation problems resulting from the use of "waterproof-breathable" fabric.

A lightweight underwear set was also introduced to combine with or substitute the polypro undergarments.

== 3rd Generation ==
The third generation 3G or GEN III Extended Climate Warfighter Clothing System features a re-design of the system. It adds seven new layers of insulation, including three Polartec fabrics: two layers of Polartec Power Dry and a layer of Polartec Thermal Pro High Loft. It has also featured PrimaLoft Silver Insulation USA in the extreme cold weather parka and trousers. The entire system weighing 12.82 lb (5.82 kg), the 12 components of the GEN III ECWCS include:

	Clothing Item	Layer	Weight LBS (KG)
1.	Light-weight Cold Weather Undershirt	Base	0.35 (0.16)
2.	Light-weight Cold Weather Drawers	Base	0.3 (0.14)
3.	Mid-weight Cold Weather Shirt	Base or Insulation	0.7 (0.32)
4.	Mid-weight Cold Weather Drawers	Base or Insulation	0.6 (0.27)
5.	Fleece Jacket	Insulation or Outer	1.05 (0.48)
6.	Wind Cold Weather Jacket	Outer	0.75 (0.34)
7.	Soft Shell Jacket	Outer	1.5 (0.68)
8.	Soft Shell Trousers (w/suspenders)	Outer	1.6 (0.73)
9.	Extreme Cold/Wet Weather Jacket	Outer	0.75 (0.34)
10.	Extreme Cold/Wet Weather Trousers	Outer	0.85 (0.39)
11.	Extreme Cold Weather Parka	Outer	2.3 (1.05)
12.	Extreme Cold Weather Trousers	Outer	2.1 (0.95)

Initial fielding of the system began in August 2007 to the 73rd Cavalry Regiment in Afghanistan.

Levels of Protection

- Level I: Sandy-colored Light-Weight polypropylene Polartec Power Dry Silkweight Undershirt & Drawers
- Level II: Sandy polyester Polartec Power Dry grid fleece Mid-Weight Shirt & Drawers
- Level III: Sandy Polartec Thermal Pro polyester High-Loft Fleece Jacket
- Level IV: Nylon Wind Jacket
- Level V: Water-repellent stretchable nylon soft shell Cold Weather Jacket & Trousers
- Level VI: Extreme Wet/Cold Weather Gore-Tex Jacket & Trousers
- Level VII: Extreme Cold Weather soft shell with PrimaLoft Silver Insulation USA Parka & Trousers

== See also ==
- VKBO Layer system the Russian equivalent

== Sources ==
TM 10-8415-236-10: Operator's Manual for Extended Cold Weather Clothing System Generation III, November 1, 2014.

- United States Army Natick Soldier Research, Development and Engineering Center, Natick, MA, Use and Care of the Extended Cold Weather Clothing System (ECWCS), January 1986.
- "ADS Operational Equipment"
