= Crochet thread =

Specially formulated thread

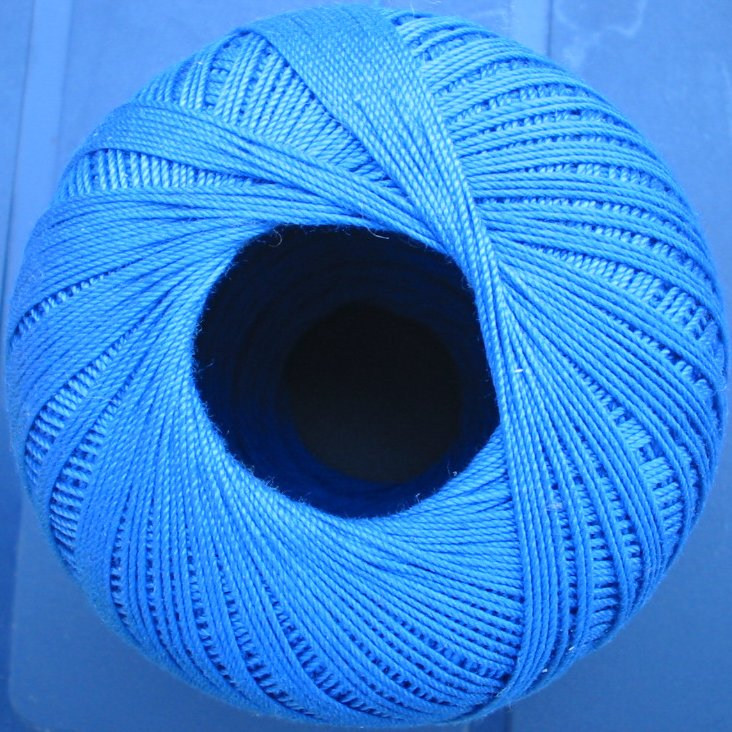
Crochet thread

Crochet thread is specially formulated thread usually made from mercerized cotton for crafting decorative crochet items such as doilies or filet crochet. Crochet thread produces fabric of fine gauge that may be stiffened with starch.

== Differences between yarn and sewing thread ==
Crochet thread is almost always produced from cotton and has a denser pile and smaller diameter than ordinary yarn. Most crochet threads are thicker in diameter than sewing thread. Crochet thread can withstand considerable stresses from pulls with sharp hooks.

Crochet manufacturing conventions treat thread and yarn quite differently: manufacturers designate different sizing scales for thread and yarn. Thread is generally packaged on spools instead of skeins or hanks and is offered for sale in a separate section from ordinary yarns or threads. Crochet hooks for use with thread are also sized according to a different scale from yarn hooks. Thread hooks are also manufactured differently from yarn hooks: modern yarn hooks are usually aluminum or plastic, while thread hooks are made of steel and have smaller hook heads and shorter shanks.

The division between yarn and thread is somewhat arbitrary: crochet thread at its thickest is similar in diameter and behavior to fine cotton yarn. The largest sizes of thread crochet hooks overlap with the smallest sizes of yarn crochet hooks.

== Sizing ==
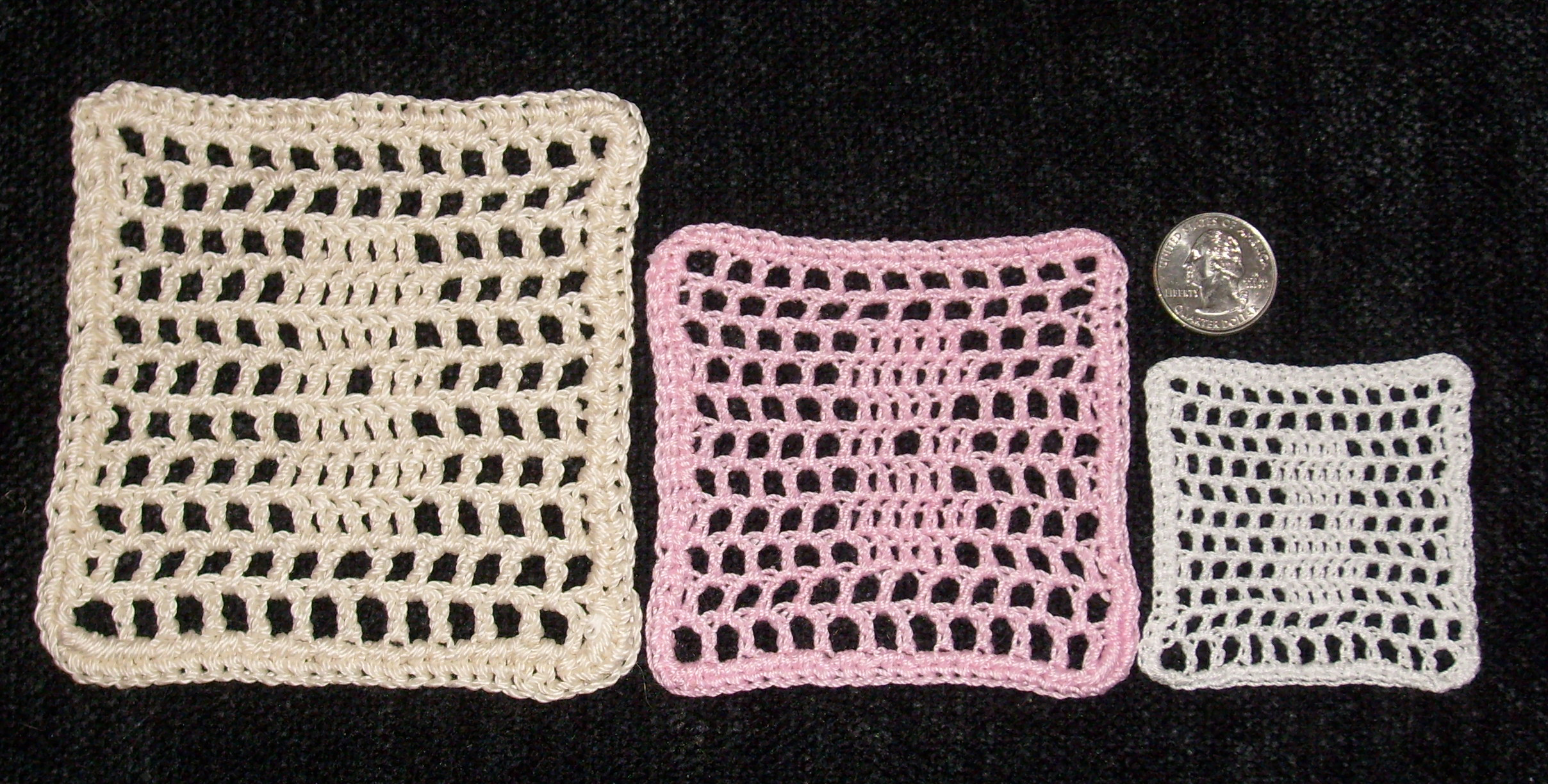
A demonstration of crochet thread weight: sample filet crochet pattern repeated in different threads. From left to right: size 3, size 10, and size 20. A U.S. quarter is included for perspective.

Crochet thread comes in sizes from 3 to 100, although historically it came in much finer sizes, down to 200. Diameter is inversely proportional to number, so size 3 is nearly as thick as yarn and size 100 is as fine as sewing thread. Thread may also be categorized by number of plies and size 10 thread is known as bedspread weight. Smaller sizes (40 and up) are often used for tatting jewelry and fine lace.
