= Filet crochet =

Type of crocheted fabric

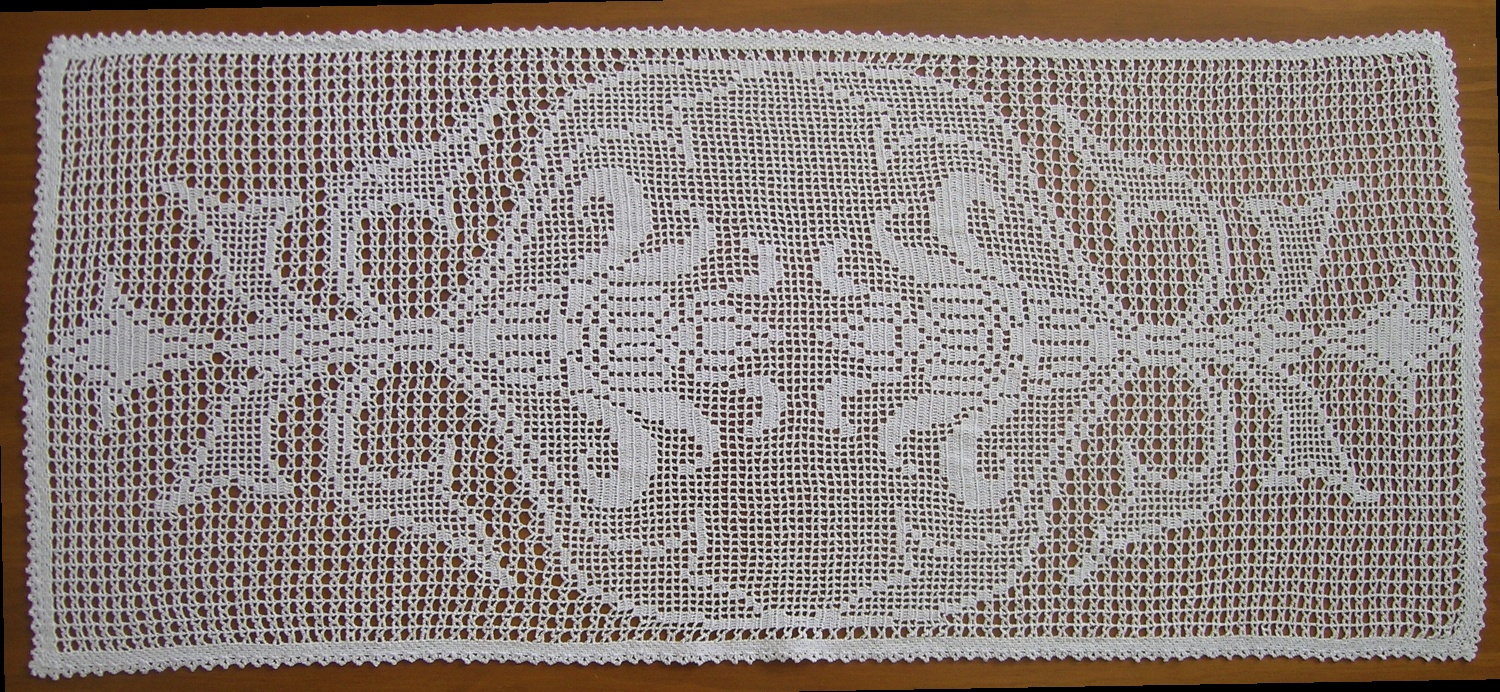
Filet crochet

Filet crochet is a type of crocheted fabric that imitates filet lace. This type of crocheted lace is gridlike because it uses only two crochet stitches: the chain stitch and the double crochet stitch (U.S. terminology; known in some other countries as chain stitch and treble). Filet crochet forms patterns by filling in parts of a mostly chain stitch mesh with double crochet stitches. Chain stitches use less yarn and fill less space than double crochet stitches, which results in a visual difference in appearance between the two kinds of stitch. Old filet patterns used a treble or triple stitch vertically but chained two between the vertical stitches. This was to prevent distortion of some patterns.

Filet crochet is often used for decorative applications, such as window curtains, tablecloths, and place settings, such as coasters and placemats. It can also be used to create clothing, including yokes, as well as accessories and small bags.

== Construction ==
Filet crochet is usually constructed from monotone crochet thread made of Mercerised cotton in white or ecru, and worked in rows. Filet crochet is most often worked from a graph or a symbol diagram. Patterns are created by combining solid and open meshes, usually working the design in solid meshes and the background in open meshes. The size of the space is determined by the number of chain stitches between each double stitch. Filet crochet may also be worked by alternating chain stitches with another type of crochet stitch such as (U.S. terminology) half double or triple crochet, and may be worked from yarn instead of thread.

== Reading Charts ==
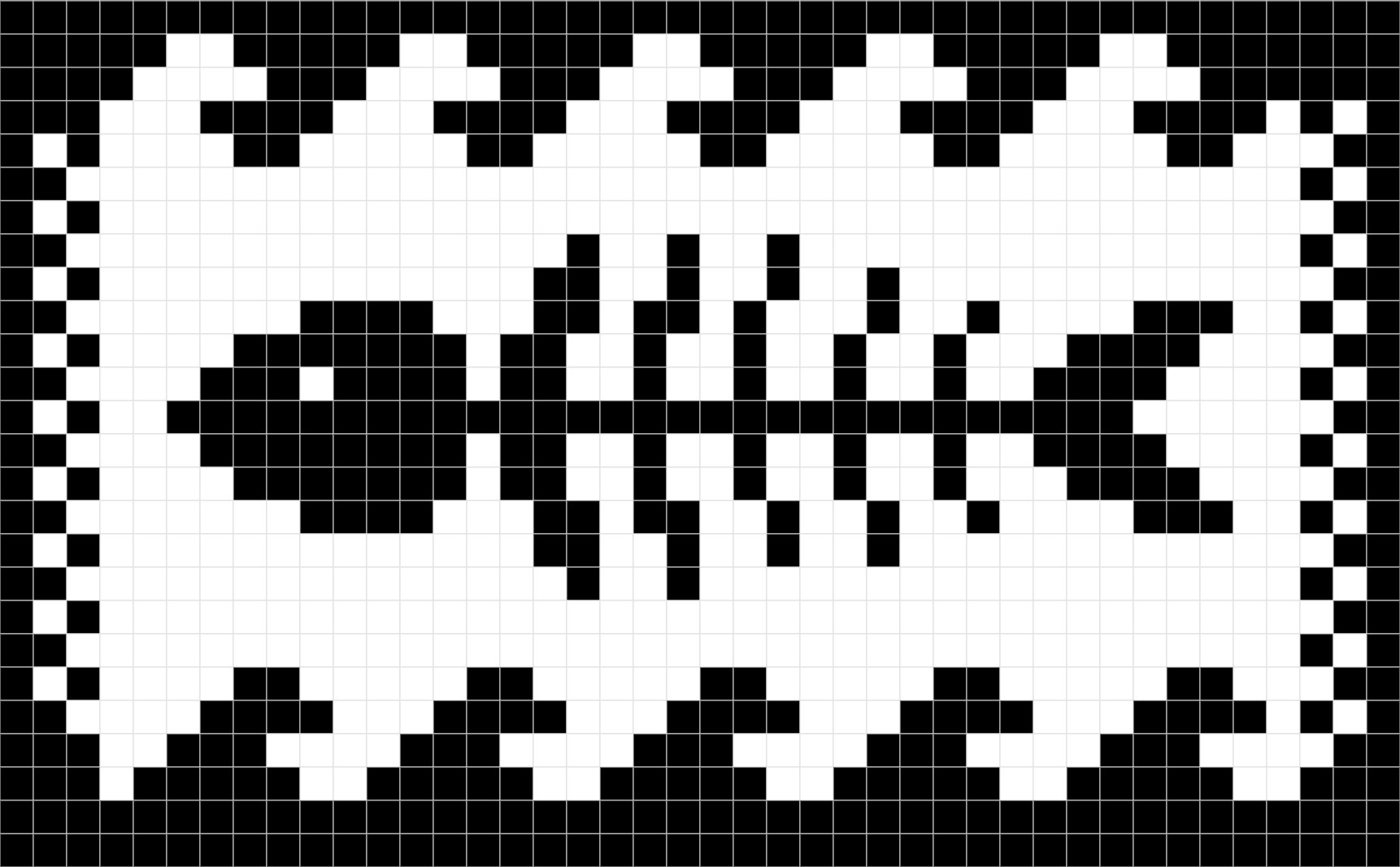
Filet crochet chart

As stated above, filet crochet patterns most often consist of a two-color grid. Each square represents either 2 chain stitches, or 2 double crochet stitches depending on the color. The space between two squares is always worked as a single double crochet stitch.

== See also ==
- List of crochet stitches
