= Yarn conditioning =

Fixing the amount of moisture in the yarns

Yarn conditioning is fixing the amount of moisture in the yarns. It is possible by conditioning them in a humidified environment or with the help of a conditioning machine.

== Moisture regain ==
A fiber's moisture regain is defined as "the amount of moisture that a material is able to reabsorb after its [sic] has been dried". It is expressed as a weight/weight percentage (w/w%) of water in a fiber versus the fiber's dry weight.

Different textile fibers have distinct moisture regain. For example, cotton has a moisture regain of 7%, and silk has a moisture regain of 11%.

Moisture regain of different textiles:

Fiber type	Moisture regain (in percentage)
Cotton	7–11
Flax	12
Wool	13–18
Silk	11
Rayon	11.5–12.5
Polyester	0.4–0.8
Nylon 6	2.8–5.0
Nylon 66	4.0–4.5
Acrylic	1.0–2.5
Modacrylic	2.0–4.0
Spandex	0.75–1.3

== Moisture content ==
In a yarn, moisture content is the moisture present in the yarn, expressed as a percentage of the total weight of the yarn. Moisture content is one of the most important tests on a yarn; a fiber's moisture content will affect the entire manufacturing process, as it affects the physical properties of a material. For instance, during yarn manufacturing, the moisture content in a yarn is lowered, which may have a negative impact on the yarn's properties. Therefore, it is considered crucial to maintain a fiber's moisture percentage throughout manufacturing. Yarn conditioning after manufacture ensures a specific property of moisture regain before sale, improving the characteristics of the resulting yarn, such as improved flexibility and strength.

=== Importance of moisture ===
The presence of water plays a crucial role in the mechanical behavior of natural fibers. Hydrated biopolymers generally have enhanced ductility and toughness. Water plays the role of a plasticizer, a small molecule easing passage of polymer chains and in doing so increasing ductility and toughness. When using natural fibers in applications outside of their native use, the original level of hydration must be taken into account. For example, when hydrated, the Young's Modulus of collagen decreases from 3.26 to 0.6 GPa and becomes both more ductile and tougher. Additionally the density of collagen decreases from 1.34–1.18 g/cm^{3} (0.048–0.043 lb/cu in).

== See also ==
- Textile manufacturing
