= Gauge (textile crafts) =

Unit of measure for knitting stitches

A gauge is the number of stitches/rows per inch (or centimeter) of a crochet or knitted item. In both crochet and knit, this is measured by making a gauge swatch.

A gauge swatch is a small sample of the pattern, made before starting the main item to allow the knitter/crocheter to measure the gauge and ensure the project will turn out to be the desired size.They are usually made in a 4" x 4" square.

After making a gauge swatch, the crocheter/knitter will measure and compare it to the specified swatch in the pattern. Adjusting their hook/needle or tension to ensure their measurements and stitches match the one in the pattern.

== In Knit ==
In knitting, the term "gauge" is used to describe the fineness size of knitting machines. It is used in both hand knitting and machine knitting. Referring to the number of stitches per inch rather than the size of the finished article of clothing. The gauge is calculated by counting the stitches (for hand knitting) or needles (on a knitting machine bed) across a number of inches, then dividing by the sample's width in inches.

== Gauge on knitting machines ==
There are two types of classification of Knitting Gauges or Unit of Measure:

- A – Used for Cotton Fully fashion flat machines (Bentley – Monk, Textima, Sheller, etc.) where "Gauge" is measured in 1.5-inch (3.8 cm) increments. The machine's gauge is expressed by the number of needles needed to achieve that gauge.
- B – Used for hand, mechanical, or modern Electronic Flat Machines (Stoll, Shima, Protti, etc.), where gauge is measured in 1-inch (2.5 cm) increments. The machine's gauge is again measured by the number of needles required to achieve that number.

== Factors that affect knitting gauge ==
The gauge of a knitted fabric depends on the pattern of stitches in the fabric, the kind of yarn, the size of knitting needles, and the tension of the individual knitter (i.e., how much yarn they allow between stitches).

- For example, ribbing and cable patterns tend to "pull in", giving more stitches over an identical width than stockinette, garter, or seed stitch. Even the same stitch produced in two different ways may produce a different gauge.
- Yarn weight is a factor; thicker yarns with less loft overall produce larger stitches than thinner yarns (reducing the number of stitches per width and length).
- Larger knitting needles also produce larger stitches, giving fewer stitches and rows per inch. Changing needle size is the best way to control one's own gauge for a given pattern and yarn.
- Finally, the knitter's tension, or how tightly one knits, can affect the gauge significantly. The gauge can even vary within a single garment, typically with beginning knitters; as knitters become more familiar with a stitch pattern, they become more relaxed and make the stitch differently, producing a different gauge.

Sometimes the gauge is deliberately altered within a garment, usually by changing needle size; for example, smaller stitches are often made at the collar, sleeve cuffs, hemline ribbing, or pocket edges.

== Factors that affect a crochet gauge ==
The following may affect the measurements of a crochet gauge

- Tension
- Type of stitch used
- Yarn
  - Yarn Weight
  - Type of yarn
- Hook size
- Whether the swatch has been/is meant to be blocked

== Knitting gauge in patterns ==
To produce a knitted garment of given dimensions, whether from one's own design or from a published pattern, the gauge should match as closely as possible; significant differences in gauge will lead to a deformed garment. Patterns for knitting projects almost always include a suggested gauge for the project. Generally, the gauge should match to better than 5%, corresponding to 1" of ease in a 20" width. Similar concerns apply to the number of rows per inch.

The gauge can be adjusted by changing needle size, without changing the pattern, stitch, yarn, or habits of the knitter. Larger needles produce a smaller gauge (fewer stitches per inch) and smaller needles produce a larger gauge (more stitches per inch). If necessary, further adjustments can be made by subtly altering the pattern dimensions, e.g., shortening a vertically aligned pattern. Ribbing can also be used to "draw in" the fabric to the proper gauge.

== Measuring knitting gauge ==
To check one's gauge before starting a project, a sample of knitting (a swatch) is made, ideally in the stitch pattern used in the garment. The edges of the swatch can impact gauge readings, so it's recommended that the swatch be a minimum of 4" square, but preferably 6–8" square for more accurate results. Dividing the number of stitches used by the actual size of the sample gives the stitch gauge of that sample. Similarly, the row gauge is calculated by dividing the number of rows knitted by the length of the sample. Making a swatch also helps familiarize the knitter with the stitch pattern and yarn, which will lead to a more uniform gauge in the final garment.

== See Also ==
- List of Crochet Stitches
- List of Knitting Stitches
- List of yarns for crochet and knitting
