= Shell stitch =

Type of crochet motif

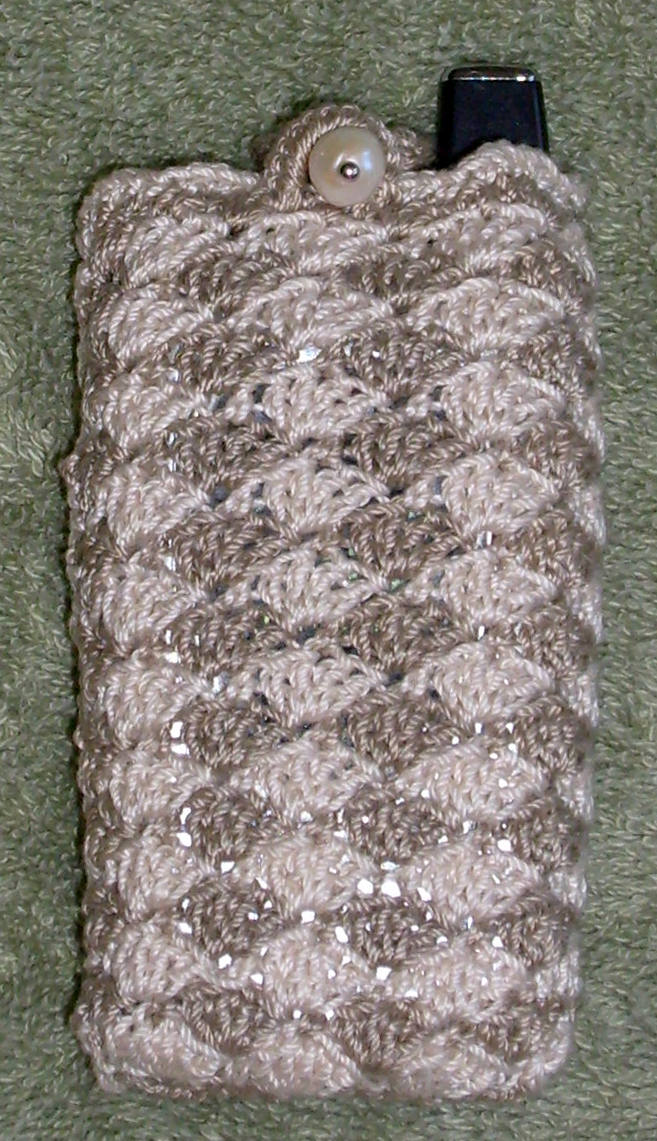
A cell phone cover made from shell stitch crochet in two colors

A shell stitch (or fan stitch) is a crochet motif often used as a border around other patterns or in staggered rows to create a distinctive fabric pattern. Shell stitches take the shape of arcs and semicircles, hence the name. Shell stitches are often used as edging for crocheted items such as Afghan blankets and sweaters.

== Construction ==
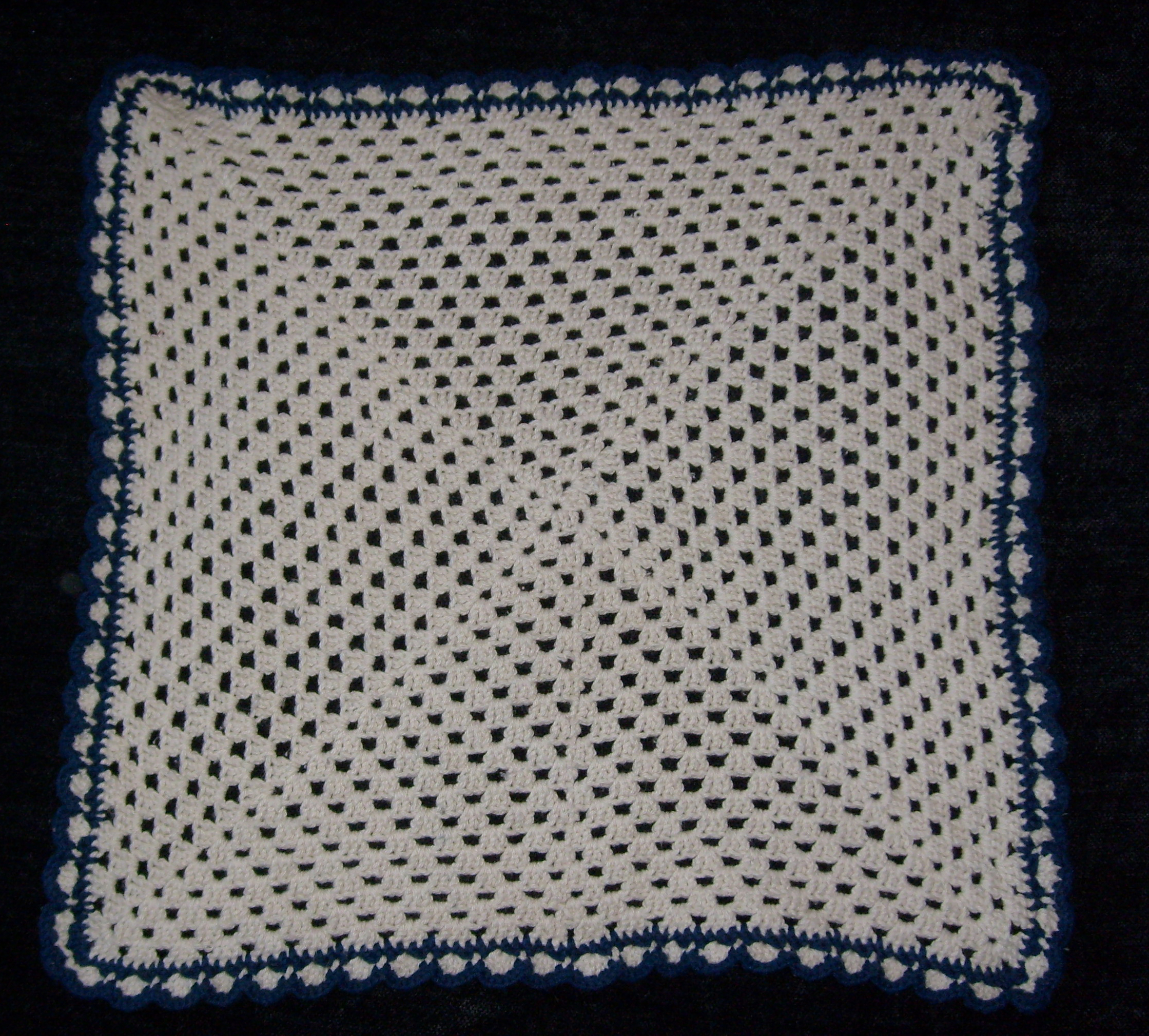
A pet blanket constructed from a single granny square with a shell stitch border, enhanced in a contrasting color with half double crochet

The basic method of producing shell stitches is to anchor several long stitches into the same base, anchoring both ends with short stitches in a manner that spreads out the cluster like a fan. Although many variations are possible, a basic shell stitch in United States terminology would be single crochet, skip two, five double crochets into previous single crochet, skip two, then single crochet into middle double crochet. In abbreviated terminology, it would read 5 dcs into previous sc, sk 2 dcs, sc into middle dc. Variant patterns may use longer stitches such as triple crochet, may vary the number of stitches, or alter the anchoring method.

Schematic of solid shell stitch, in international symbols. The chain stitches at the bottom are shown only for scale, and are not repeated in the main fabric.

Shell stitch borders can be worked around any regular pattern. The visual effect of a shell stitch border may be enhanced by working a single or half double crochet in a contrasting color into the base row and over the shells. When the entire fabric consists of shell stitches the visual effect may be enhanced by alternating two or three different colors; one for each row.

== Fan stitch ==
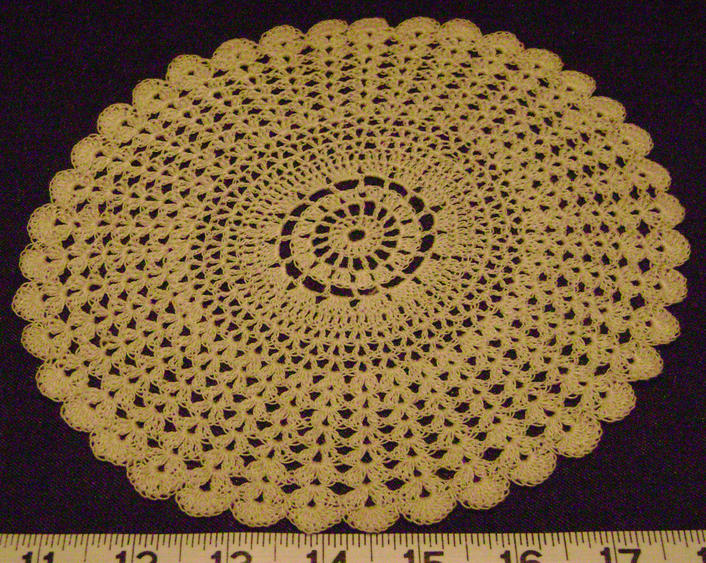
The outer half of this doily was done in a fan stitch.

Schematic of a crochet fan stitch, in international symbols

Fan stitch is closely related to shell stitch. We may define a "shell" as five crochet stitches (usually double crochets) done into a single stitch, whereas a "fan" is two such stitches, followed by a chain and two more such stitches. Fan stitch crochet also differs in that the fans are generally stacked on top of one another, with each fan being done into the middle chain of the fan in the previous row, which splits the previous fan into two symmetrical parts. For comparison, shells are not split and, in solid shell stitch, are half-staggered; each shell is done into the single crochet between the shells of the previous row.
