= List of crochet stitches =

There are two types of written notation for Crochet stitches; U.S. terminology (used in America and Canada), and U.K./British terminology (used across Europe, India, Australia, and others). Schematic crochet symbols have a consistent meaning internationally.

While the craft yarn council regulates the standards for crochet terminology, abbreviations may still vary between patterns and designers.

== Basic stitches ==
Listed in order of height. Almost all other crochet stitches are variations of the basic stitches.

Photograph	Schematic	U.S. term	U.K. term	Abbreviations (U.S./U.K)	Turning chain	Number of turning chains
		chain stitch		ch	N/A	N/A
		slip stitch	slip stitch / single crochet	slst/ss	N/A	0
		single crochet	double crochet	sc/dc		1
		half double crochet	half treble crochet	hdc/htr		2
		double crochet	treble crochet	dc/tr		3
		triple/treble crochet	double treble crochet	tr/dtr		4
		double treble crochet	triple/treble treble crochet	dtr/ttr		5

== Increasing and decreasing stitches ==
An increase stitch refers to two or more stitches worked into the same spot (stitch); adding to the total number of stitches. The abbreviation 'inc' is standard internationally.

A decrease stitch refers to one stitch worked across two or more spots (stitches); subtracting from the total number of stitches. Internationally abbreviated as 'dec' (decrease) or 'st2tog' (stitch two together (i.e.: sc2tog). A decrease worked over three stitches is referred to as 'st3tog' (stitch three together (i.e.: sc3tog))

To find the turning chain, refer to the corresponding base stitch in the table above.

Increase stitches
Photograph	Schematic	U.S. term	U.K. term	Abbreviations
sc-inc in red yarn	or	single crochet increase	double crochet increase	inc US: sc-inc UK: dc-inc
hdc-inc in red yarn	A schematic diagram of a U.S. half double crochet increase	half double crochet increase	half treble crochet increase	US: hdc-inc UK: htr-inc
dc-inc in red yarn	A schematic diagram of a U.S. double crochet increase	double crochet increase	treble crochet increase	US: dc-inc UK: tr-inc
trc-inc in red yarn		triple crochet increase/treble crochet increase	double treble crochet increase	US: tr-inc UK: dtr-inc
dtrc in red yarn		double treble crochet increase		US: dtr-inc UK:
Decrease Stitches
sc-dec in red yarn		single crochet decrease/two single crochets together		dec/sc-dec/sc2tog
sc3tog in red yarn		three single crochets together		sc3tog
hdc-dec in red yarn		half double crochet decrease/two half double crochets together		hdc-dec/hdc2tog
hdc3tog in red yarn		three half double crochets together		hdc3tog
dc-dec in red yarn		double crochet decrease/two double crochets together		dc-dec/dc2tog
dc3tog in red yarn		three double crochets together		dc3tog
trc-dec in red		treble crochet decrease/two treble crochets together		tr-dec/tr2tog
trc3tog in red yarn		three treble crochets together		tr3tog
dtrc-dec in red yarn		double treble crochet decrease/two double treble crochets together		dtr-dec/dtr2tog
		three double treble crochets together		dtr3tog

== Other commonly abbreviated stitches ==
Photograph	Schematic	Term	Abbreviations	Relevancy/Notes	Pattern
		Back Loops only / Front Loops only	BLO / FLO		Insert hook into either the front loop of a stitch or the back loop.
	(identical to regular sc-dec)	Invisible decrease	inv-dec/dec	Commonly used in amigurumi, slightly less visible than a regular sc-dec	Insert hook into front loops of next 2 stitches, YO pull through 2 loops, YO pull through 2 loops.
		Front post stitches	FP[basic stitch here] (i.e.: FPsc, FPhdc)	Commonly used to create ribbing patterns, shorter than its original basic stitch	Insert hook in from the back of the gap and into the front of the next gap, with the post in front of the hook.
		Shell stitch			
		Popcorn stitch	pc		
		Cluster/Puff/Bobble	cl/ps/puff/bo		
		Cluster			
		Picot	p/picot	Commonly used to create a lacy texture in borders	Chain 3, YO pull through 2 loops, crochet a basic stitch on the next stitch.

== See also ==
- List of knitting stitches
- Gauge (Textile Crafts)
- List of Yarns for Crochet and Knitting
