= Yarn =

Long continuous length of interlocked fibers

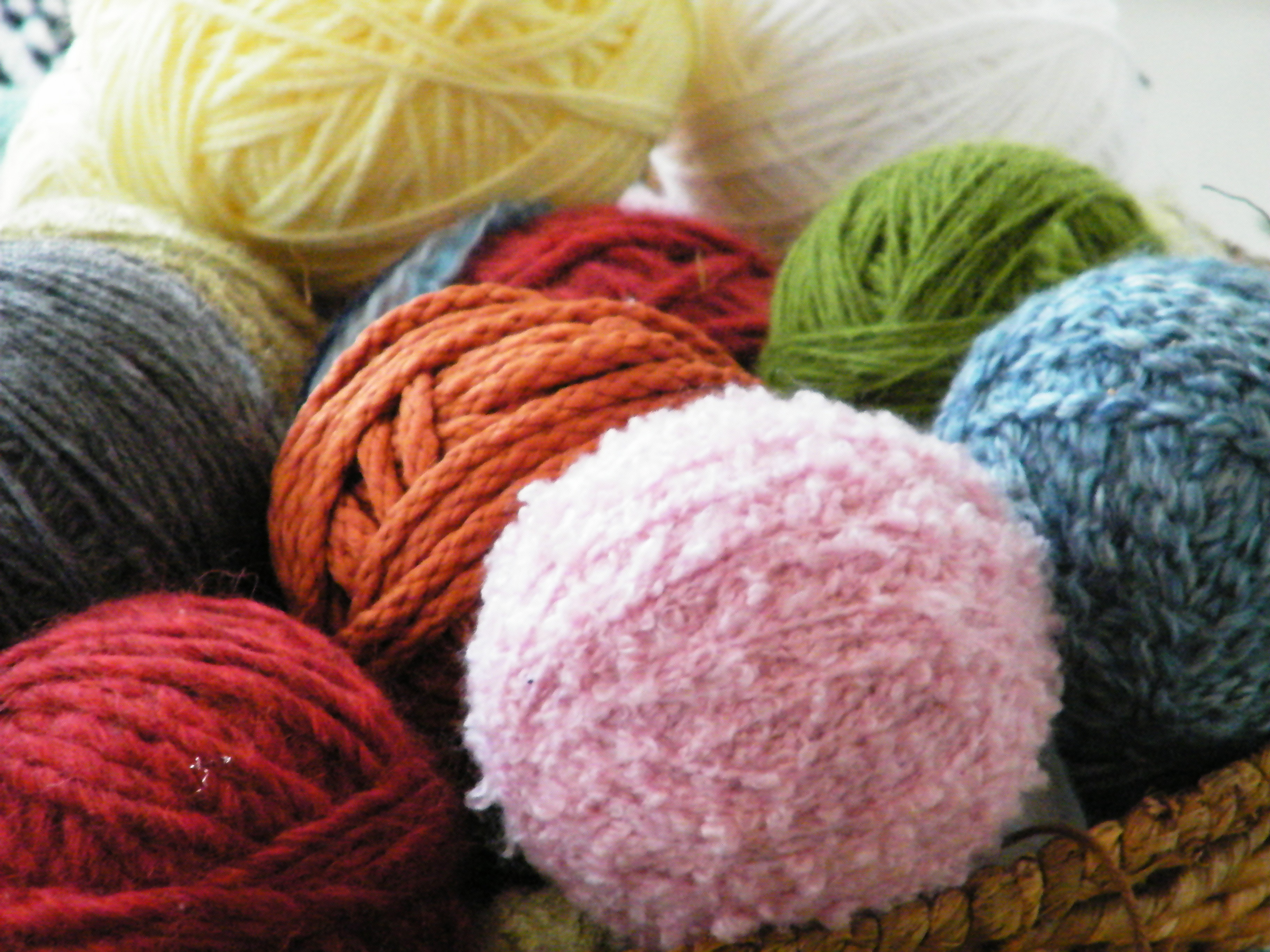
- Balls of yarn

Yarn is a long continuous length of interlocked fibres, used in sewing, crocheting, knitting, weaving, embroidery, ropemaking, and the production of textiles. Thread is a type of yarn intended for sewing by hand or machine. Modern manufactured sewing threads may be finished with wax or other lubricants to withstand the stresses involved in sewing. Embroidery threads are yarns specifically designed for needlework. Yarn can be made of a number of natural or synthetic materials, and comes in a variety of colors and thicknesses (referred to as "weights"). Although yarn may be dyed different colors, most yarns are solid colored with a uniform hue.

== Etymology ==
The word "yarn" comes from Middle English, from the Old English gearn, akin to Old High German garn, "yarn", Dutch garen, Ancient Greek χορδή (chordē, "string"), and Sanskrit hira, "band". It originally referred to entrails.

== History ==
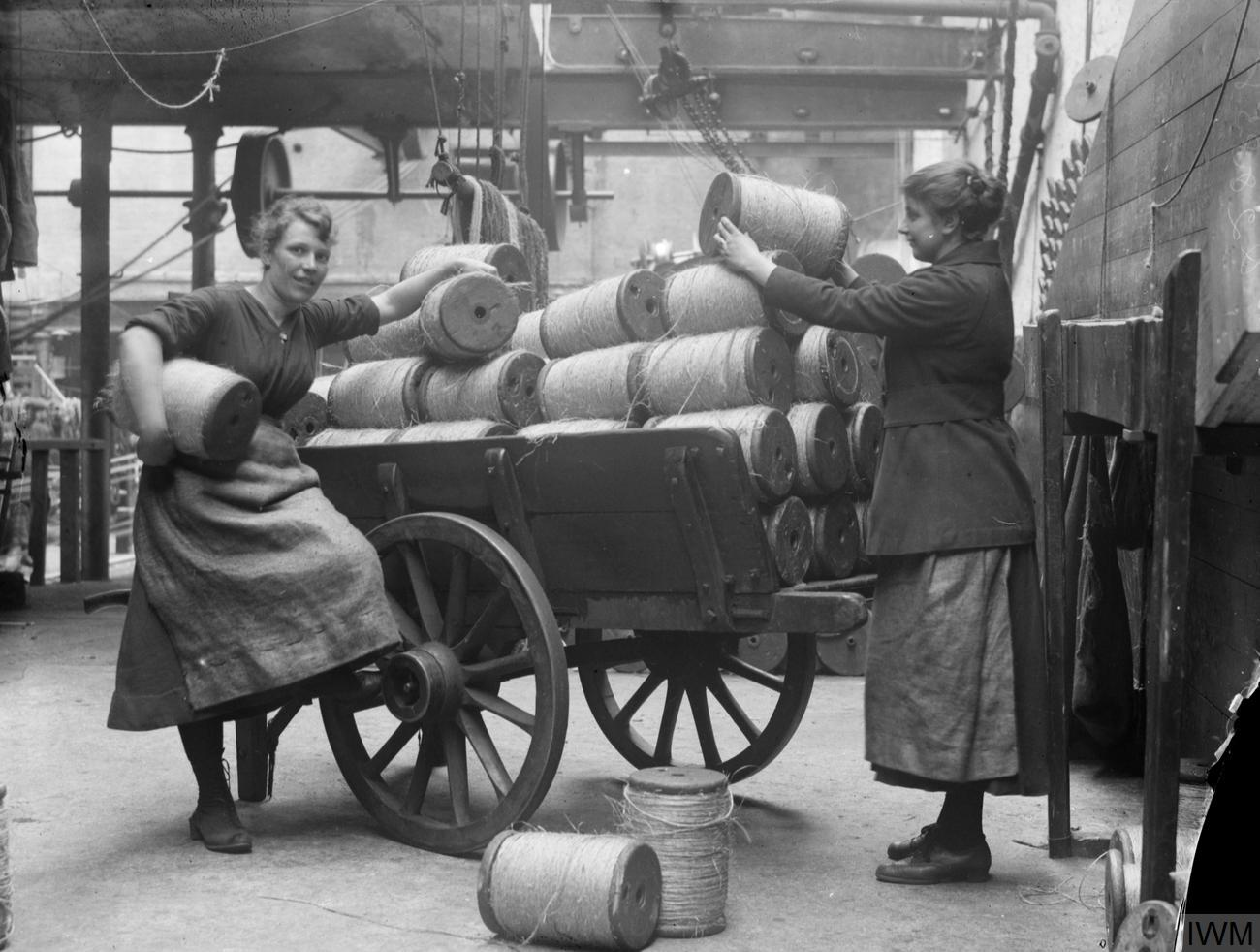
Natural-fiber yarns used in the production of rope, Scotland, 1918

The human production of yarn is known to have existed since the Stone Age. Fiber materials came from animal hides, reeds, cotton, wool, and silk. Textile trade contributed immensely to the ancient global economy.

== Materials ==
Yarn can be made from a number of natural or synthetic fibers, or a blend of natural and synthetic fibers.

=== Natural fibers ===
==== Cotton ====
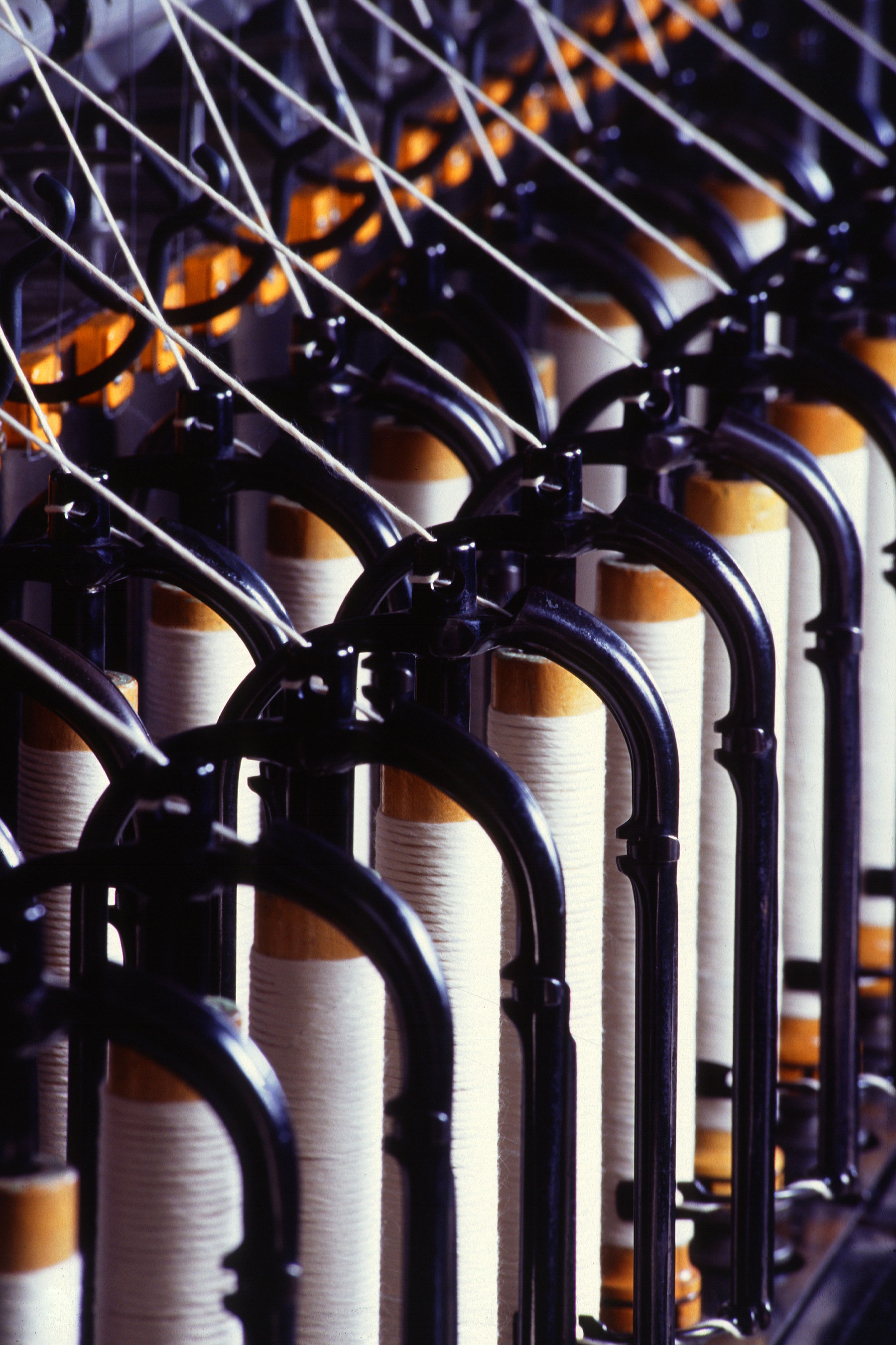
Flyer spinning of cotton

The most common plant fiber is cotton, which is typically spun into fine yarn for mechanical weaving or knitting into cloth.

==== Silk ====
Silk is a natural protein fiber, some forms of which can be woven into textiles. The protein fiber of silk is composed mainly of fibroin and is produced by the larvae of the moth Bombyx mori. Silk production is thought to have begun in China and silk thread and cloth manufacture was well-established by the Shang dynasty (1600–1050 BCE).

==== Linen ====
Linen is another natural fiber with a long history of use for yarn and textiles. Linen fibers are derived from the flax plant.

==== Other plant fibers ====
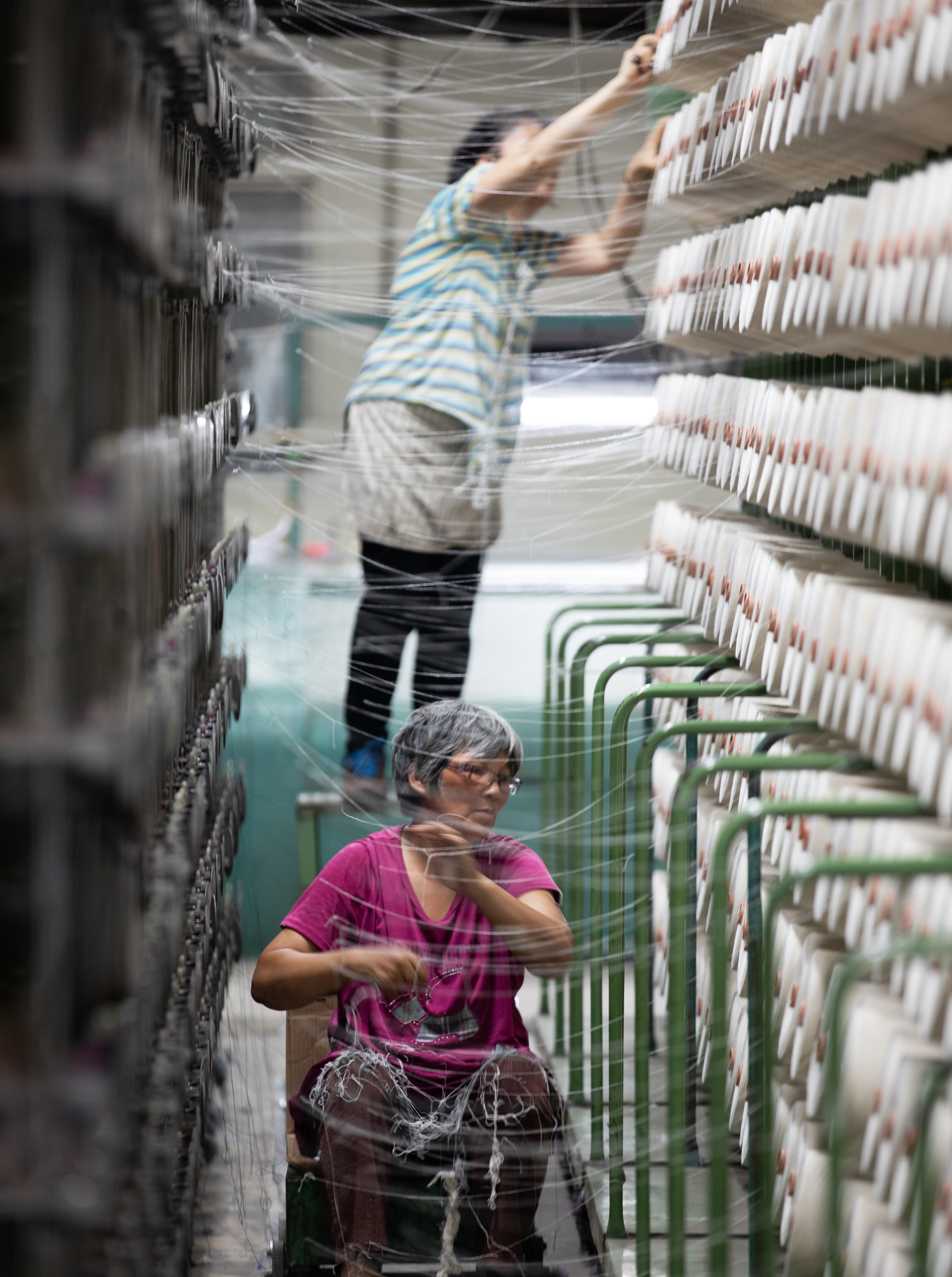
Manila hemp warp yarns being prepared for weaving in a modern textile factory

Other plant fibers which can be spun include bamboo, hemp, maize, nettle, and soy fiber.

==== Animal fibers ====
The most common spun animal fiber is wool harvested from sheep. As long fibers make better yarn, sheep have been bred over time to produce longer fibers. This increases the need for shearing to prevent pests and overheating.

Other animal fibers used include alpaca, angora, mohair, llama, cashmere, and silk. More rarely, yarn may be spun from camel, yak, possum, musk ox, vicuña, cat, dog, wolf, rabbit, bison, or chinchilla hair, as well as turkey or ostrich feathers.

=== Synthetic fibers ===
Some examples of synthetic fibers that are used as yarn are nylon, acrylic fiber, rayon, and polyester. Synthetic fibers are generally extruded in continuous strands of gel-state materials. These strands are drawn (stretched), annealed (hardened), and cured to obtain properties desirable for later processing.

Synthetic fibers come in three basic forms: staple, tow, and filament. Staple is cut fibers, generally sold in lengths up to 120 mm. Tow is a continuous "rope" of fibers consisting of many filaments loosely joined side-to-side. Filament is a continuous strand consisting of anything from one filament to many. Synthetic fiber is most often measured in a weight per linear measurement basis, along with cut length. Denier and Dtex are the most common weight to length measures. Cut-length only applies to staple fiber.

Filament extrusion is sometimes referred to as "spinning," but most people equate spinning with spun yarn production.

=== Yarn from recycled materials ===
T-shirt yarn is a recycled yarn made from the same fabric as is used in T-shirts and other clothes. It is often made from the remainder fabric of clothing manufacture, and therefore is considered a recycled and eco-friendly product. It can also be made at home out of used clothing. The resulting yarn can be used in knitted or crocheted items.

=== Comparison of material properties ===
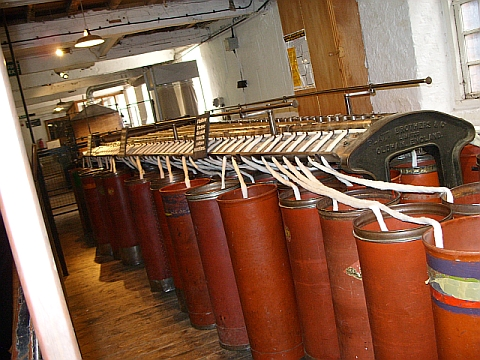
A fully restored Derby Doubler, winding a sliver lap ready for finisher carding at Quarry Bank Mill in the UK

In general, natural fibers tend to require more careful handling than synthetics because they can shrink, felt, stain, shed, fade, stretch, wrinkle, or be eaten by moths more readily, unless special treatments such as mercerization or super washing are performed to strengthen, fix color, or otherwise enhance the fiber's own properties.

Some types of protein yarns (i.e., hair, silk, feathers) may feel irritating to some people, causing contact dermatitis, hives, or wheezing. These reactions are likely a sensitivity to thicker and coarser fiber diameter or fiber ends. In fact, contrary to popular belief, wool allergies are practically unknown. According to a study reviewing the evidence of wool as an allergen conducted by Acta Dermato-Venereologica, contemporary superfine or ultrafine Merino wool with their reduced fiber diameters do not provoke itch, are well tolerated and in fact benefit eczema management. Further studies suggest that known allergens applied during textile processing are minimally present in wool garments today given current industry practices and are unlikely to lead to allergic reactions.

When natural hair-type fibers are burned, they tend to singe and have a smell of burnt hair; this is because many, like human hair, are protein-derived. Cotton and viscose (rayon) yarns burn as a wick. Synthetic yarns generally tend to melt, though some synthetics are inherently flame-retardant. Noting how an unidentified fiber strand burns and smells can assist in determining if it is natural or synthetic, and what the fiber content is.

Both synthetic and natural yarns can pill. Pilling is a function of fiber content, spinning method, twist, contiguous staple length, and fabric construction. Single ply yarns or using fibers like merino wool are known to pill more due to the fact that in the former, the single ply is not tight enough to securely retain all the fibers under abrasion, and the merino wool's short staple length allows the ends of the fibers to pop out of the twist more easily.

Yarns combining synthetic and natural fibers inherit the properties of each parent, according to the proportional composition. Synthetics are added to lower cost, increase durability, add unusual color or visual effects, provide machine washability and stain resistance, reduce heat retention, or lighten garment weight.

== Structure ==
A Spinning Jenny, spinning machine which was significant in the beginning of the Industrial Revolution

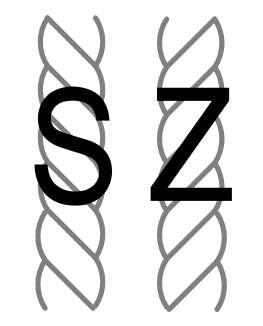
S- and Z-twist yarn

=== Spun yarn ===
Spun yarn is made by twisting staple fibers together to make a cohesive thread, or "single". Twisting fibers into yarn in the process called spinning can be dated back to the Upper Paleolithic, and yarn spinning was one of the first processes to be industrialized. Spun yarns are produced by placing a series of individual fibers or filaments together to form a continuous assembly of overlapping fibers, usually bound together by twist. Spun yarns may contain a single type of fiber, or be a blend of various types. Combining synthetic fibers (which can have high strength, luster, and fire retardant qualities) with natural fibers (which have good water absorbency and skin comforting qualities) is very common. The most widely used blends are cotton-polyester and wool-acrylic fiber blends. Blends of different natural fibers are common too, especially with more expensive fibers such as alpaca, angora and cashmere.

Yarn is selected for different textiles based on the characteristics of the yarn fibers, such as warmth (wool), light weight (cotton or rayon), durability (nylon is added to sock yarn, for example), or softness (cashmere, alpaca).

Yarn is composed of twisted strands of fiber, which are known as plies when grouped together. These strands of yarn are twisted together (plied) in the opposite direction to make a thicker yarn. Depending on the direction of this final twist, the yarn will have either s-twist (the threads appear to go "up" to the left) or z-twist (to the right). For a single ply yarn, the direction of the final twist is the same as its original twist. The twist direction of yarn can affect the final properties of the fabric, and combined use of the two twist directions can nullify skewing in knitted fabric.

The mechanical integrity of yarn is derived from frictional contacts between its composing fibers. The science behind this was first studied by Galileo.

==== Carded and combed yarn ====
Combed yarns are produced by adding another step of yarn spinning, namely combing, which aligns the fibers and removes the short fibers carried over from the previous step of carding. Combed yarn results in superior-quality fabrics. In comparison to carded yarns, this particular yarn is slightly more expensive, because the weaving is a long, consuming process. Combing separates small fibers from elongated fibers, in which this procedure makes the yarn softer and smoother.

==== Hosiery yarn ====
Hosiery yarns are used in the manufacturing of knitted fabrics. Since the knitted materials are more delicate than woven materials; hence hosiery yarns are made 'softer' with fewer twists per inch than their woven counterparts. Hosiery yarn comes from a separate spinning process (melt spinning), and is used with circular knitting machines to form fabric.

==== Open-end yarn ====
Open-end yarn is produced by open-end spinning without a spindle. The method of spinning is different from ring spinning. In open-end yarn, there is no roving frame stage. Sliver from the card goes into the rotor, is spun into yarn directly. Open-end yarn can be produced from short fibers. Open-end yarns are different from ring yarns. Open-end yarns are limited to coarser counts.

==== Novelty yarn ====
Novelty yarns or complex yarns are yarns with special (fancy) effects introduced during spinning or plying. One example is slub yarns, yarn with thick or thin sections alternating regularly or irregularly. In a similar manner, creating deliberate unevenness, additions or injections of neps or metallic or synthetic fibers (along with natural fibers) in spinning creates novelty yarns.

=== Filament yarn ===
Filament yarn consists of filament fibers (very long continuous fibers) either twisted together or only grouped together. Thicker monofilaments are typically used for industrial purposes rather than fabric production or decoration. Silk is a natural filament, and synthetic filament yarns are used to produce silk-like effects.

==== Texturized yarn ====
Texturized yarns are made by a process of air texturizing filament yarns (sometimes referred to as taslanizing), which combines multiple filament yarns into a yarn with some of the characteristics of spun yarns. They are synthetic continuous filaments that are modified to impart special texture and appearance. It was originally applied to synthetic fibers to reduce transparency, slipperiness and increase warmth, absorbency and makes the yarn more opaque. It was used to manufacture a variety of textile products: knitted underwear and outer wear, shape-retaining knitted suits, overcoats. They also were used in the production of artificial fur, carpets, blankets, etc.

== Colour ==
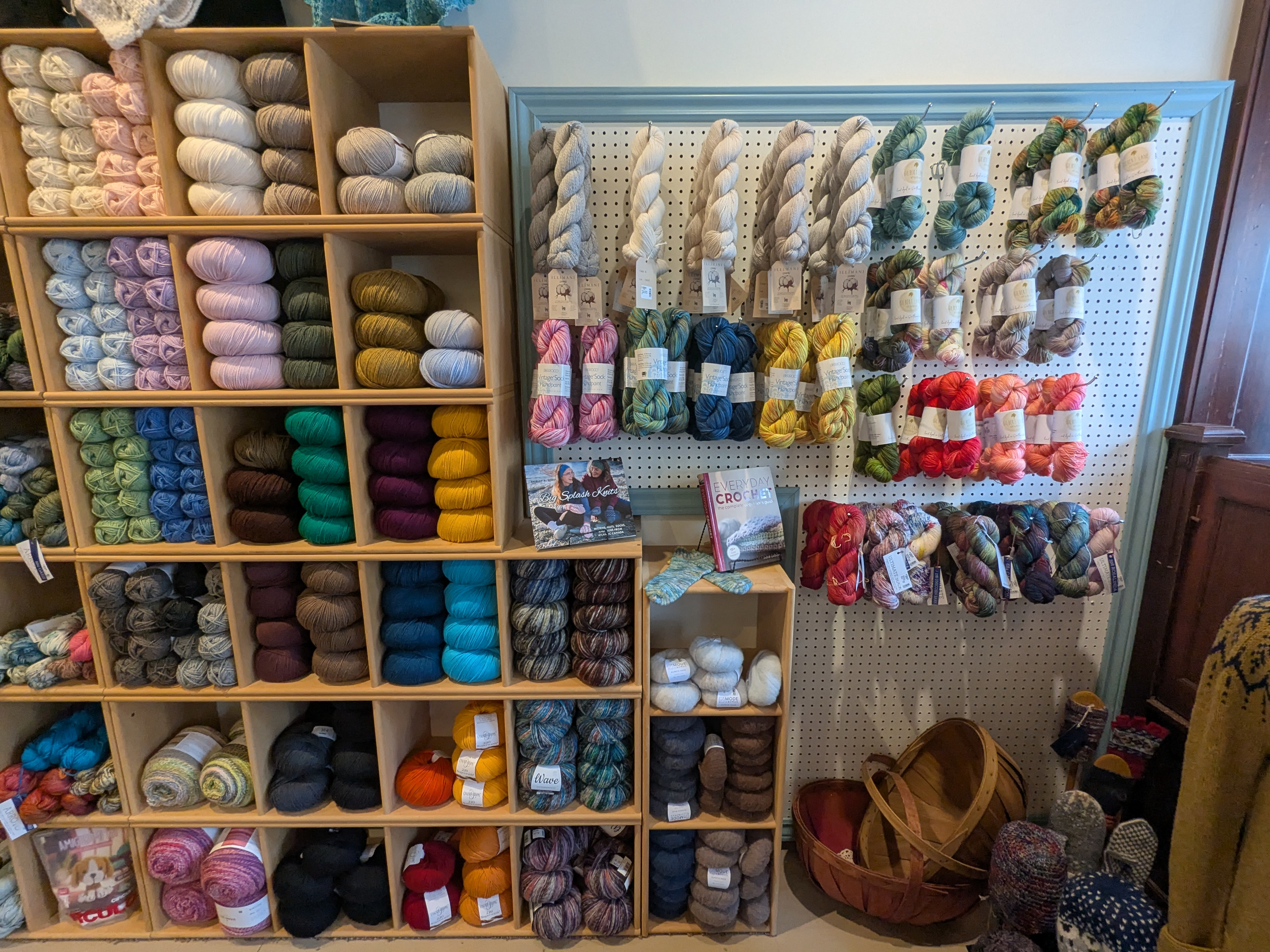
Yarn in various colors sold at a yarn store

Yarn may be used undyed, or may be colored with natural or artificial dyes. Most yarns have a single uniform hue, but there is also a wide selection of variegated yarns:

- Heathered or tweed: yarn with flecks of different colored fiber
- Ombré: variegated yarn with light and dark shades of a single hue
- Multicoloured: variegated yarn with two or more distinct hues (a "parrot colourway" might have green, yellow and red)
- Self-striping: yarn dyed with lengths of color that will automatically create stripes in a knitted or crocheted object
- Marled: yarn made from strands of different-coloured yarn twisted together, sometimes in closely related hues

Each of these different colors and styles are achieved through a process called yarn dyeing. There are many different methods of yarn dyeing: package dyeing, skein dyeing, space dyeing, warp beam dyeing, and more.

- Package Dyeing: This is the most commonly used method. This is when yarn is already spun up in bulk and then lowered into a chamber filled with dye. When the yarn is done absorbing the dye, it is removed from the cylindrical chamber to dry.
- Skein or hank dyeing: A yarn dyeing method in which yarn is wound into loose skeins or hanks and suspended from carrier rods before being immersed in a dye bath. Because the yarn is not wound under compression, dye liquor circulates freely through the yarn, promoting uniform dye penetration while preserving yarn bulk and softness. The method is commonly used for wool, cotton, silk, cashmere, and other specialty yarns, although it generally requires more manual handling and lower production rates than package dyeing.
- Space Dyeing: This method is used to achieve the multi-colored effect. This method is achieved by taking sections of yarn and dipping them into different colors. After dipping one section into a color, a chemical called mordant is used to permanently keep that color on the yarn so that the next color will not bleed into the prior color.
- Warp Beam Dyeing: This is a larger version of package dyeing; however, it is only used in the manufacture of woven fabrics.

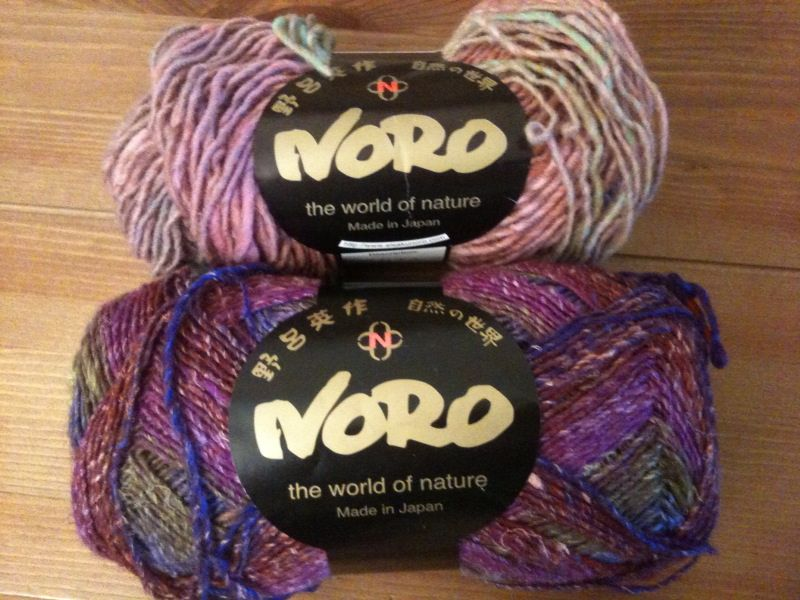
A comparison of yarn weights (thicknesses): the top skein is aran weight. The manufacturer's recommended knitting gauge appears on the label: 5 to 7 stitches per inch using size 4.5 to 5.1 mm needles. The bottom skein is sock weight, specifically for knitting socks. Recommended gauge: 8 to 10 stitches per inch, using size 3.6 to 4.2 mm needles.

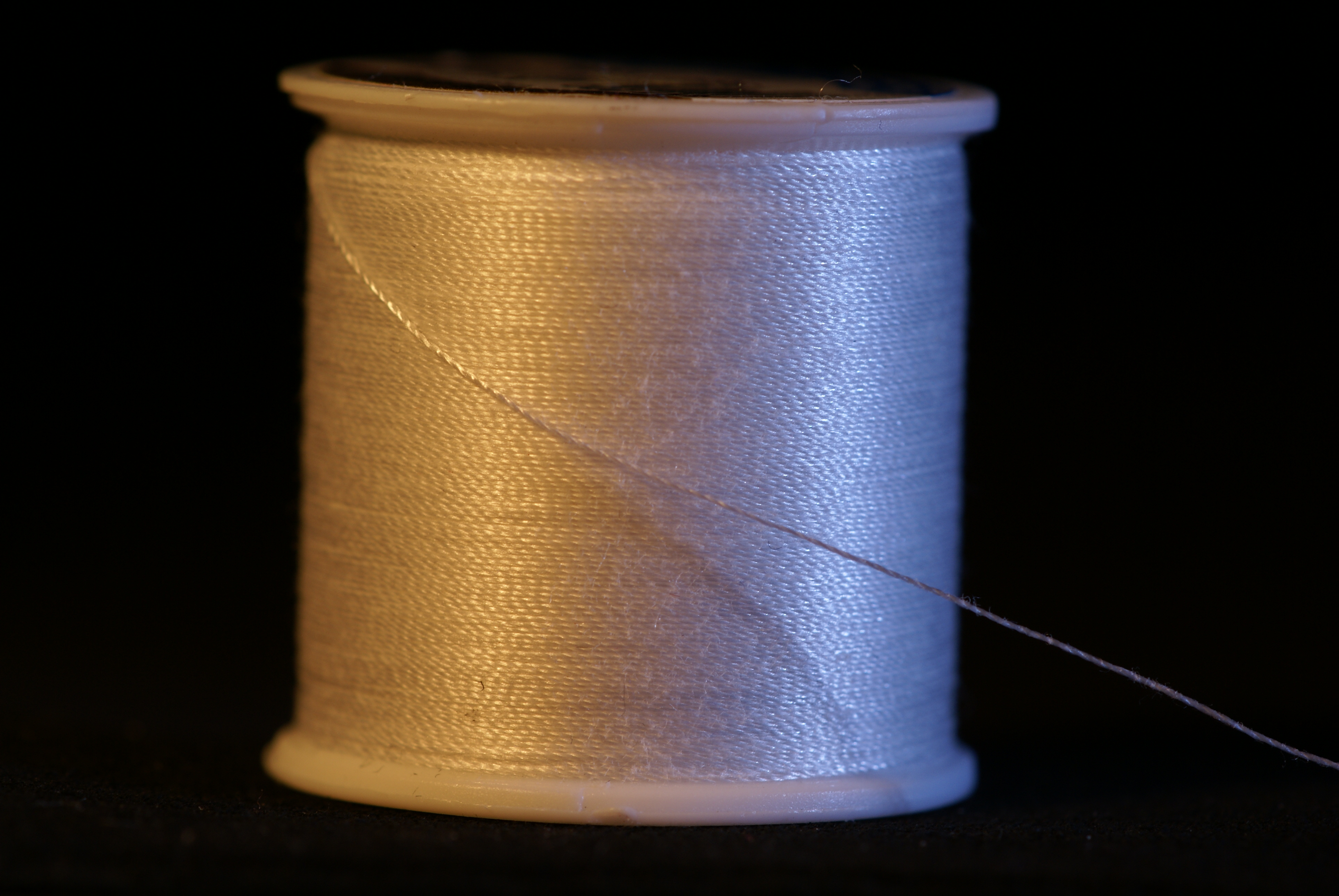
Spool of all purpose sewing thread. Closeup shows texture of 2-ply, Z-twist, mercerized cotton with polyester core.

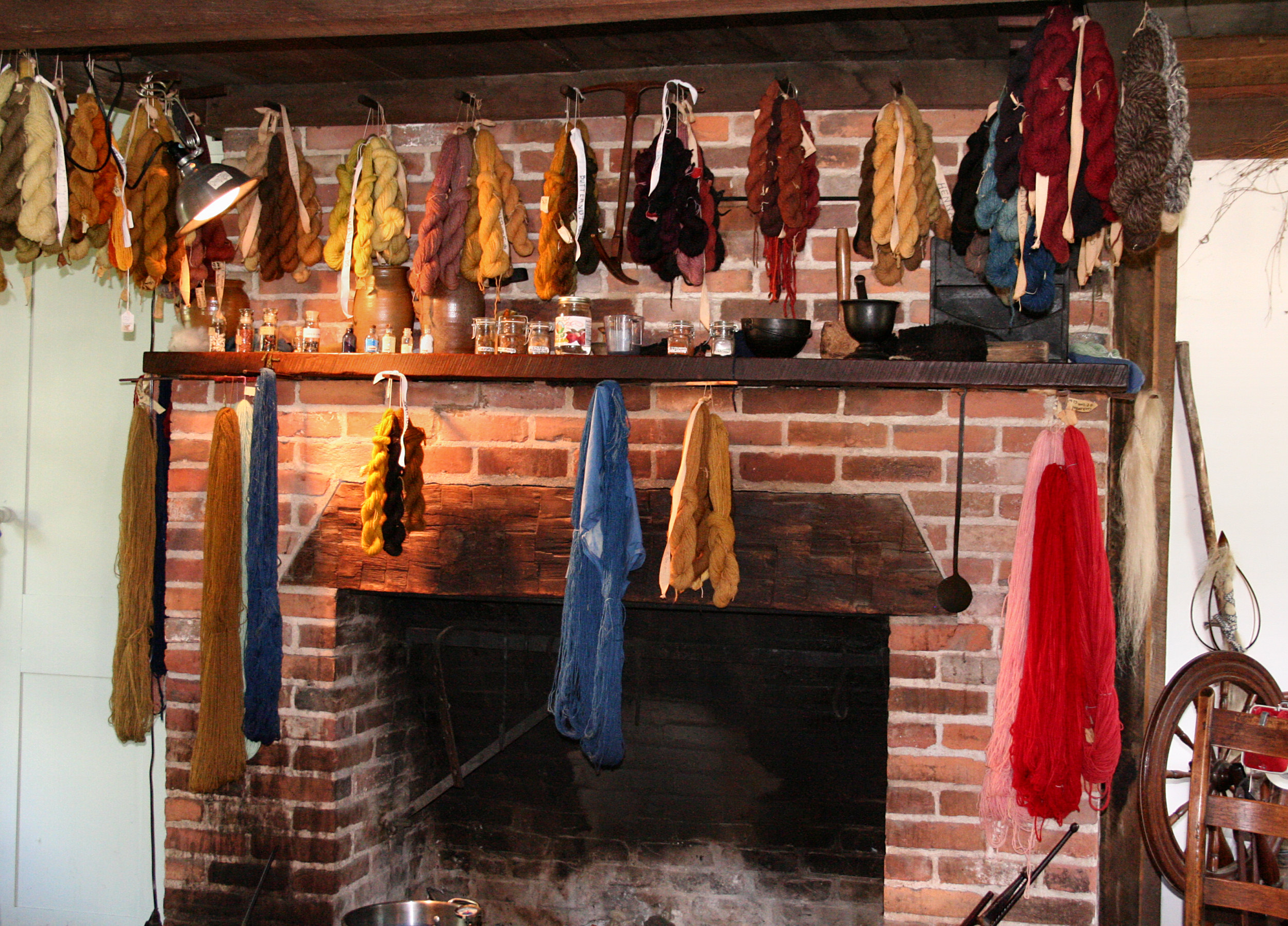
Yarn drying after being dyed in the early American tradition, at Conner Prairie living history museum

== Weight ==
Yarn quantities for handcrafts are usually measured and sold by weight in ounces (oz) or grams (g). Common sizes include 25g, 50g, and 100g skeins. Some companies also primarily measure in ounces with common sizes being three-ounce, four-ounce, six-ounce, and eight-ounce skeins. Textile measurements are taken at a standard temperature and humidity because variations in heat and humidity can cause fibers to absorb different amounts of moisture from the air, thus increasing the measured weight of the yarn without adding any fiber material. The actual length of the yarn contained in a ball or skein can vary due to the inherent heaviness of the fiber and the thickness of the strand; for instance, a 50 g skein of lace weight mohair may contain several hundred meters, while a 50 g skein of bulky wool may contain only 60 metres.

Craft yarn comes in several thicknesses or weights. This is not to be confused with the measurement and weight listed above. The Craft Yarn Council of America promotes a standardized industry system for measuring yarn weight, where weights are numbered from 0 (finest) to 7 (thickest). Each weight can be described by a number and name: Size 0 yarn is called Lace, size 1 is Super Fine, size 2 is Fine, size 3 is Light, size 4 is Medium, size 5 is Bulky, size 6 is Super Bulky, and size 7 is Jumbo.

Each weight also has several commonly used but unregulated terms associated with it. However, this naming convention is more descriptive than precise; fiber artists disagree about where on the continuum each lies, and the precise relationships between the sizes. These terms include: fingering, sport, double-knit (or DK), worsted, aran (or heavy worsted), bulky, super-bulky, and roving.

Labels on yarn for handicrafts often include information on gauge, which can also help determine yarn weight. Gauge, known in the UK as tension, is a measurement of how many stitches and rows are produced per inch or per cm on a specified size of knitting needle or crochet hook. The proposed standardization uses a four-by-four inch/ten-by-ten cm knitted stockinette or single crocheted square, with the resultant number of stitches across and rows high made by the suggested tools on the label to determine the gauge.

In most of the world except America, textile engineers often use the unit tex, which is the weight in grams of a 1000 metres of yarn, or decitex, which is a finer measurement corresponding to the weight in grams of 10,000 metres of yarn. Many other units have been used over time by different industries.

Standardized yarn weight system
Category name	Description	Crochet gauge (stitches per inch in single crochet)	Metric hook size	US hook size	Knitting gauge (number of stitches per four inches in stockinette)	Metric knitting needle size	US knitting needle size
Lace	fingering, crochet 10-count thread	33–40 sts	1.5–2.25 mm	B‑1	33–40 sts	1.5–2.25 mm	000–1
Super fine	sock, fingering, baby	21–32 sts	2.25–3.5 mm	B‑1 – E‑4	27–32 sts	2.25–3.25 mm	1–3
Fine	sport, baby	16–20 sts	3.5–4.5 mm	E‑4 – 7	23–26 sts	3.25–3.75 mm	3–5
Light	DK, light worsted	12–17 sts	4.5–5.5 mm	7 – I‑9	21–24 sts	3.75–4.5 mm	5–7
Medium	worsted, Afghan, Aran	11–14 sts	5.5–6.5 mm	I‑9 – K‑10 1/2	16–20 sts	4.5–5.5 mm	7–9
Bulky	chunky, craft, rug	8–11 sts	6.5–9 mm	K‑10 1/3 – M‑13	12–15 sts	5.5–8 mm	9–11
Super bulky	bulky, roving	5–9 sts	9–15 mm	M‑13 – Q	7–11 sts	8–12.75 mm	11–17
Jumbo	jumbo, roving	6 sts and fewer	15 mm and higher	Q and larger	6 sts and fewer	12.75 mm and higher	17+

== Yarn skeins ==
There are many different ways in which yarn is wound in sewing related uses, including hanks, skeins, donut balls, cakes, and cones.

=== Hank ===
A hank of yarn is a looped bundle of yarn, similar to how wire is typically sold. The yarn is usually tied in two places directly opposite each other to keep the loops together and to keep them from tangling. Hanks are a preferred method of fastening yarn for many yarn sellers and yarn-dyers due to its ability to more widely display the qualities of the fiber. It is often wound using a swift, a standing contraption that holds a yarn hank without obstruction and spins on a central axis to facilitate yarn ball winding There are two subtypes of hanks: twisted and folded. A twisted hank is a hank that has been twisted into a rope braid. A folded hank is a hank that has been folded in half and wrapped in a label for retail purposes.

=== Skein ===
Skeins are one of the most common types of yarn ball in the craft sewing sector, though rarely used in more mainstream textiles.. Although skeins are technically described as yarn that has been wound into an oblong shape, the word "skein" is used generically to describe any ball of yarn. Many large-scale yarn retailers, like Lion brand, and parent companies, like Yarnspirations, sell their yarn in skeins. Unlike other types of yarn balls, a skein allows you to access both ends of the yarn. The yarn end in the inside of the skein is called a center pull. One major complaint of center pull bullet skeins is that the inside yarn end is not easily found, and often is pulled out of the skein in a jumble of tangled yarn called "yarn barf". There are two types of skeins: a pull skein, which is more rectangular in shape, and a bullet skein, which is rounder.

== See also ==
- Crochet thread
- Dye lot
- Electrically conducting yarn
- Embroidery thread
- Microfiber
- ISO 2
- List of novelty yarns
- List of yarns for crochet and knitting
- Thread (yarn)
- Textile manufacturing
- Yarn bombing
- Yarn conditioning
