= Bunny boots =

Extreme Cold weather boots, originally issued to the military

Bunny boots or Mickey Mouse boots (depending on the version) are the most common nicknames for the Extreme Cold Vapor Barrier Boots (Types I and II) used by the United States Armed Forces. These large, bulbous, waterproof rubber boots can be worn in extremely cold weather, −20 to −60 °F (−29 to −51 °C), with the liner-free interior retaining warmth by sandwiching up to one inch of wool and felt insulation between two vacuum-tight layers of rubber. These boots were originally developed at the Navy Clothing and Textile Research Center in Natick, Massachusetts, for use during the Korean War.

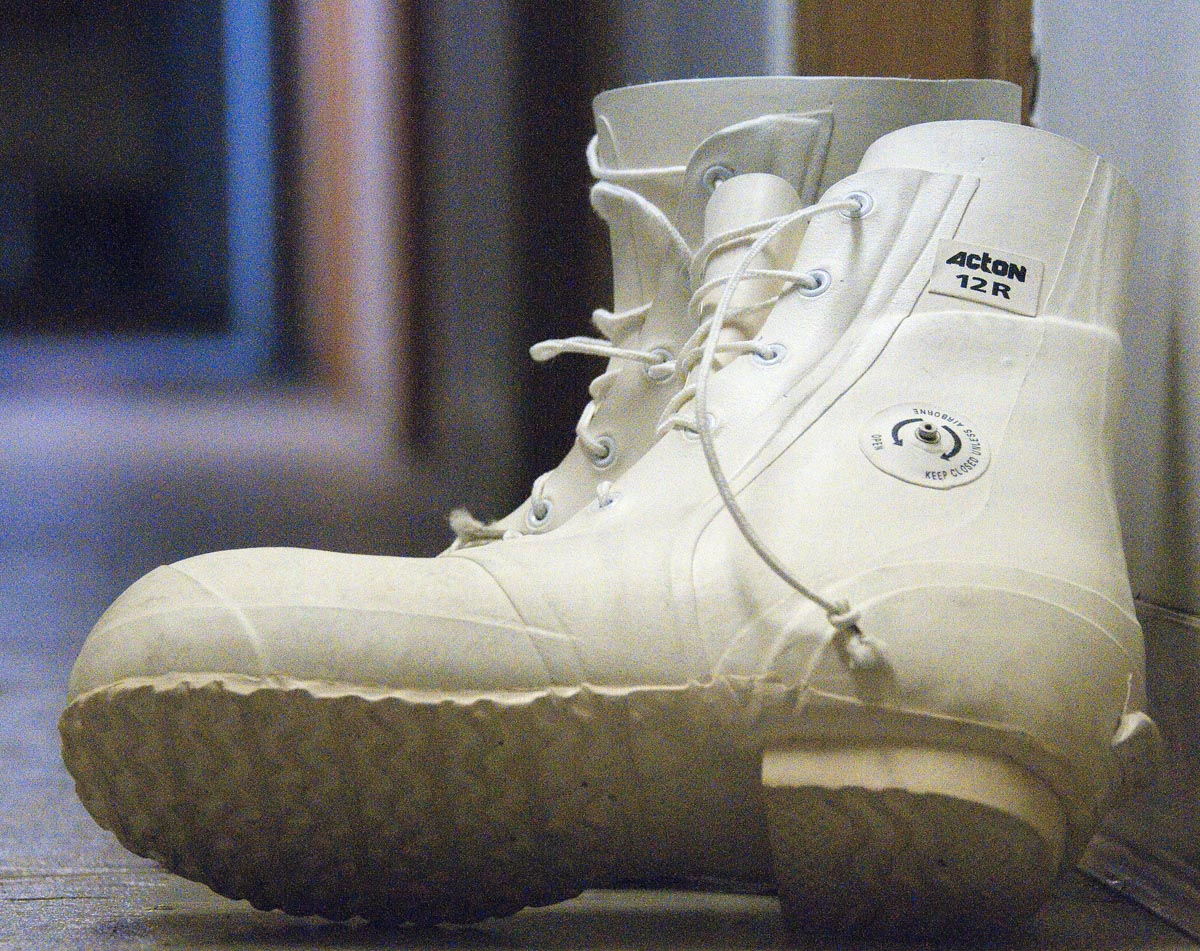
Example of Bunny boots, Point Lay, Alaska.

Originally designed during the Korean War for military expeditions in extremely cold weather (presently defined by the National Weather Service as −35 °F (−37 °C)), the ECVB Boots are rated to either −20°F to −60°F (depending on the type) and have been sold to civilians in large numbers as military surplus.

Owing to their warmth and low price, these boots have become staple extreme cold weather gear both in civilian work and recreational environments. Bunny boots are common in arctic climates such as Alaska.

The Original U.S. Army military bunny boots had leather uppers with double buckles, with felt lowers and hard leather soles that were very slippery on ice and snow. They came with felt boot liners.

In 2024, Alaska Gear Company announced that it had redesigned the original Extreme Cold Weather Vapor Barrier Boots and simply named them Bunny Boots. The Alaska Gear Company Bunny Boots have a taller shank and no air valve. Previously, they were only manufactured for the military but now the public can also buy a new pair.

== Description ==
=== Type I ===
The black pairs, called Mickey Mouse boots (due to their oversized appearance resembling the feet of the eponymous cartoon mouse), weigh 44 oz. (1.25 kg) apiece, are rated for temperatures down to −20 °F (−28.9 °C) and are made with oil/diesel resistant rubber. They are less common and predate the post-Korea white pairs ("bunny boots") which are still issued today.

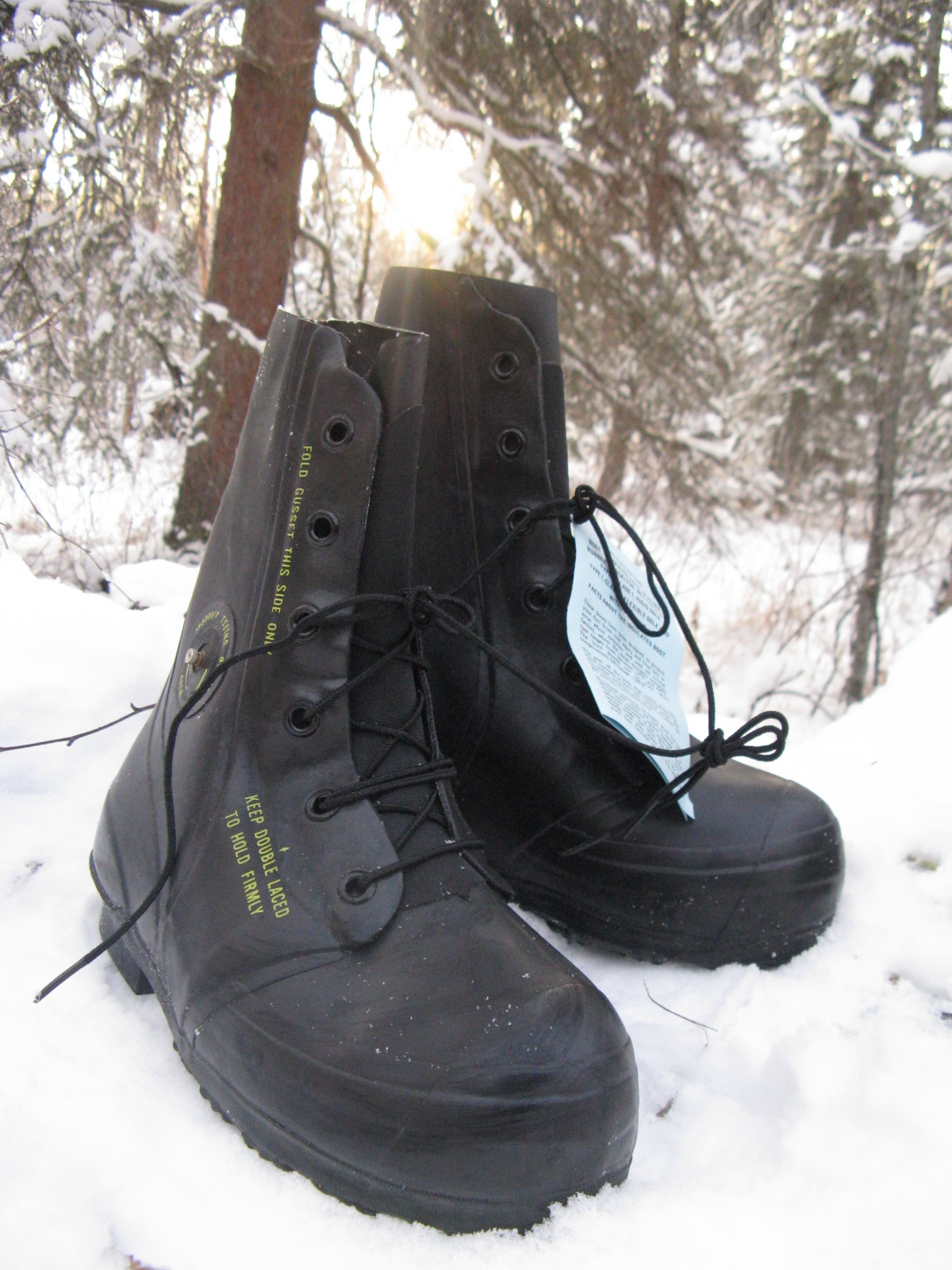
Bata Mickey Mouse boots

=== Type II ===
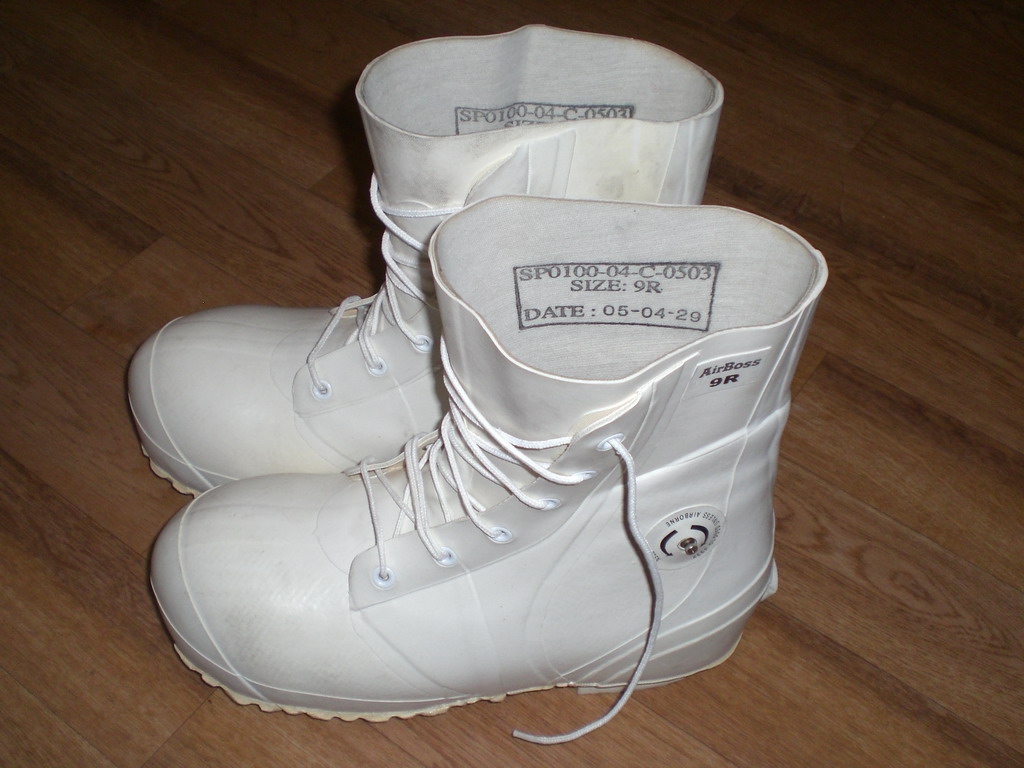
White bunny boots

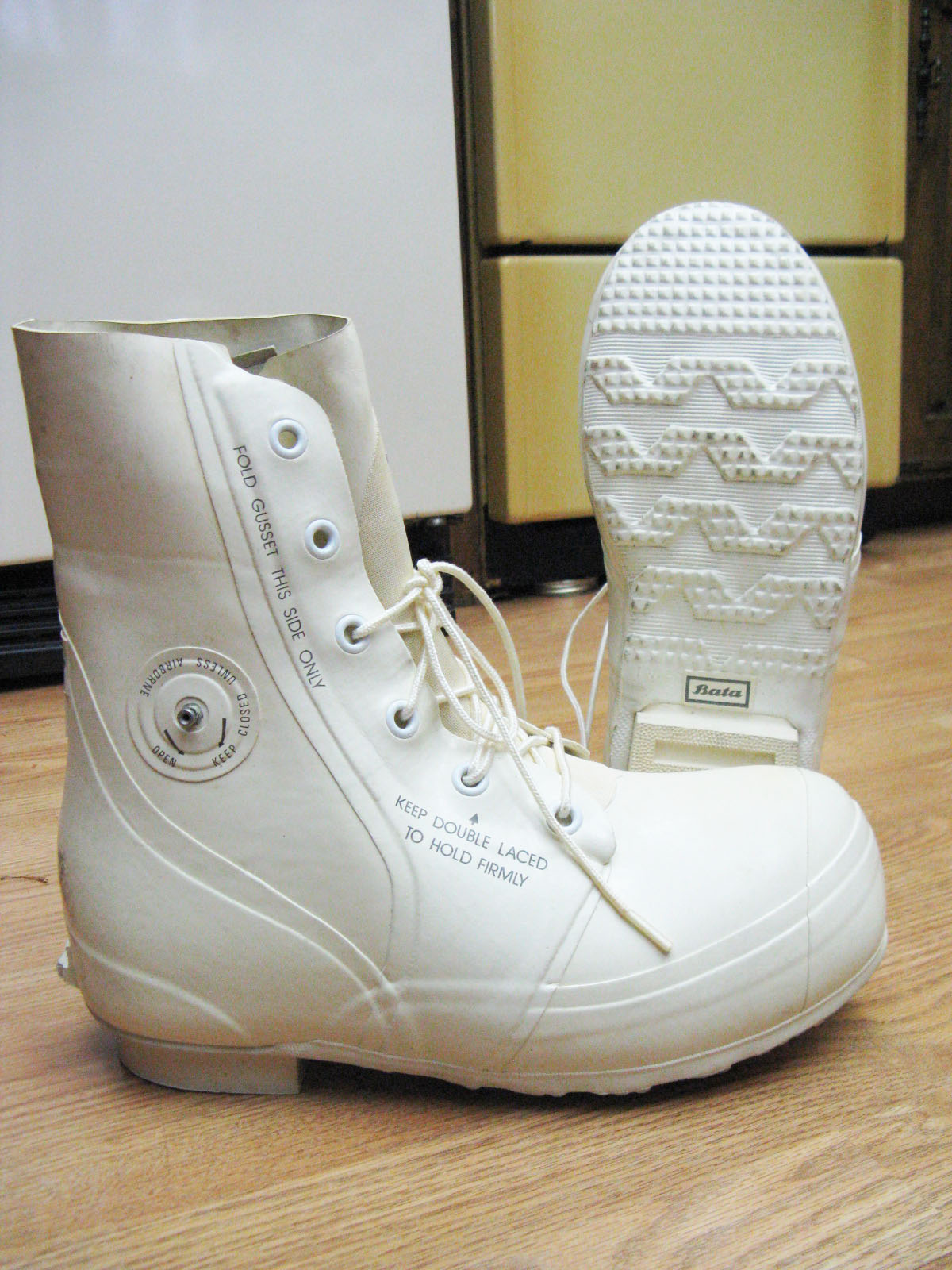
White Bata bunny boots

The white "Bunny boot" is an improved version of the Type I "Mickey Mouse boot", designed for use in even more extreme cold weather, and is rated all the way down to −65 °F (−54 °C). Given the sufferings of the soldiers fighting in the Battle of Chosin Reservoir in Korea, inducing many cases of frostbite, even with Type I boots, the Type II was created to encompass the "worst case scenario" need to field soldiers in the coldest conditions in which any military force could reasonably attempt to conduct operations (including Alaska, Siberia and both poles). For comparison, the average winter temperature at the South Pole in Antarctica is roughly −56 °F (−49 °C). The boot is slightly bigger and heavier (~8 oz. (0.22 kg) more per boot) than the black Type I because of the extra insulation. These boots are manufactured by several companies including Bata, Acton and Air Boss.

Both Mickey Mouse boots and bunny boots have an air valve on each of the boots. These air valves must be opened prior to flying to ensure that the air pressure differential between the walls of the boot and the outside air does not cause the boots to rupture.

The boot is nicknamed after the snowshoe hare, which is commonly found near Fort Greely, Alaska. During the fall the hares' fur changes color from brown to white, allowing it to blend in with its winter surroundings. As winter gets closer, more and more hares appear with their new white "boots".

Both Mickey Mouse boots and bunny boots have rubber wedges on the back of the heel. These wedges lock into military-standard ski and snowshoe bindings.

=== Alaskan Bunny Boots ===
Alaska Gear Company redesigned and recreated original Bunny Boots from 1950s. They retained essential features such as multi-layered insulation and waterproof rubber exterior while advancing the use of modern materials and ergonomic improvements, such as a moisture-expulsion insole and more traction on the outsole. The major change to the original Bunny boot was the removal of the air valve.

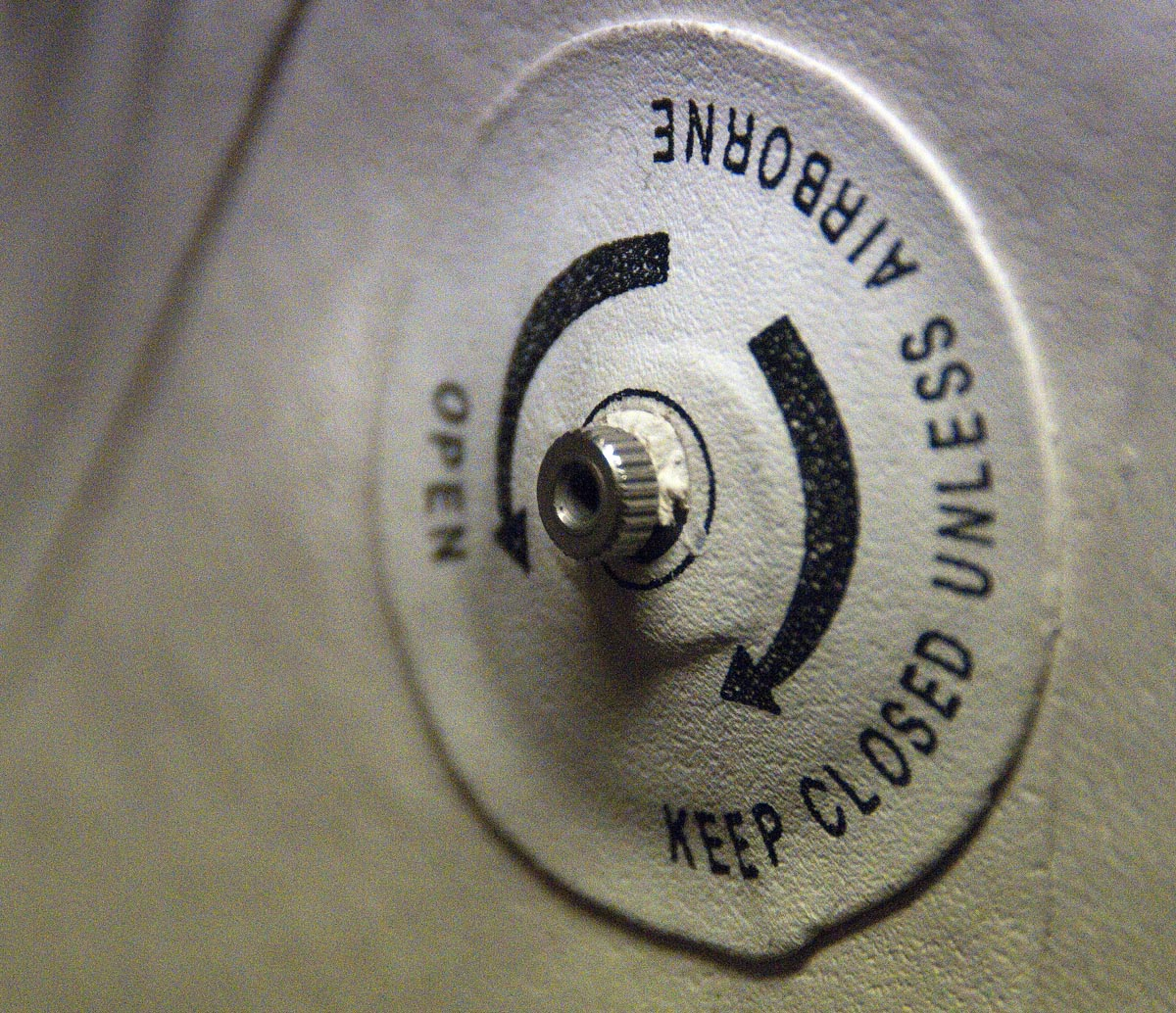
The air release valve on a bunny boot.

== See also ==
- List of boots
- List of shoe styles
