= Taslanizing =

Process for making air-textured yarns

Taslanizing or taslanising is a process for making textured yarns, involving air-texturing or heat-treatment. Taslan is an expired registered trademark of DuPont for this process, first registered on October 19, 1954. In German the word is Luftex. The process is simply feeding a bundle of continuous filament yarns into a small jet nozzle with various amounts of slack (overfeed). High-pressure air ( > 100 PSI ) creates suction and a turbulent airstream which tangles any slack into a yarn with a similar hand as a spun yarn. It is the turbulent airflow that tangles the fibers. This method of yarn production creates a yarn that is normally more even than spun yarn and does not pill like spun yarn.

The yarn used is typically polyester, nylon, or a blend. Besides the expected properties of these synthetic fibers, it is also breathable and lightweight.

Taslan is also a name for yarn made using this process. Taslan is used in: outdoor clothing and sportswear, footwear, upholstery and home textiles, and luggage or travel bags.

Invista has a branded version known as "Supplex®".
