= List of yarns for crochet and knitting =

== Yarn size ==
Depending on the exact yarn weight and the gauge of the knitter or crocheter and how tight or loose the yarn is held, the gauge listed below can vary. The type of yarn can also affect the look of the item, so if it’s thicker yarn the item will look bulkier compared to yarn that is thinner. For this reason it is important to check the gauge of the pattern being used to be sure so the finished project is the desired size. Most patterns have a listed gauge to create an item of the size(s) indicated in the pattern.

| Category name | Symbol | Description | Crochet gauge (single crochet to four inch) | Metric hook size | US hook size | Knitting gauge (number of stitches per four inches) | Metric knitting needle size | US knitting needle size |
|---|---|---|---|---|---|---|---|---|
| Lace | | fingering, crochet 10-count thread | 33 - 40 sts | 1.5 - 2.25 mm | B-1 | 33 - 40 sts | 1.5mm - 2.25mm | 000-1 |
| Super fine | | sock, fingering, baby | 21 - 32 sts | 2.25 - 3.5 mm | B-1 - E-4 | 27 - 32 sts | 2.25mm -3.25mm | 1-3 |
| Fine | | sport, baby | 16 - 20 sts | 3.5 - 4.5 mm | E-4 - 7 | 23 -26 sts | 3.25mm - 3.75mm | 3-5 |
| Light | | DK, light worsted | 12 - 17 sts | 4.5 - 5.5 mm | 7 - I-9 | 21 - 24 sts | 3.75mm - 4.5mm | 5-7 |
| Medium | | worsted, Afghan, Aran | 11 - 14 sts | 5.5 - 6.5 mm | I-9 - K-10 1/2 | 16 - 20 sts | 4.5mm - 5.5mm | 7-9 |
| Bulky | | chunky, craft, rug | 8 - 11 sts | 6.5 - 9 mm | K-10 1/3 - M-13 | 12 - 15 sts | 5.5mm - 8mm | 9-11 |
| Super Bulky | | bulky, roving | 5 - 9 sts | 9 - 15mm | M-13 - Q | 7 - 11 sts | 8mm - 12.75mm | 11-17 |
| Jumbo | | jumbo, roving | 6 sts and fewer | 15mm and higher | Q and larger | 6 sts and fewer | 12.75mm and higher | 17+ |

== Terminology ==
Common terms used to describe knitting and crochet yarn properties.

| Term | Description |
|---|---|
| Absorbency | The ability of a fiber to hold water, determines sweat absorption and suitability for warm weather wear. |
| Breathability | How readily air passes through the fiber. |
| Dyeability | How well the fiber accepts and holds color. |
| Hand/Handle | Tactile description: softness, resiliency, etc. |
| Loft | The amount of air between fibers. |
| Resiliency (elasticity) | The tendency of a fiber to resume its original shape after stretching. |
| Thickness | The diameter of the fiber in micrometres. |

== Fiber type ==
=== Plant based ===
==== Cottons ====
All varieties of cotton have a dull finish unless mercerized. Cotton yarn has minimal elasticity unless blended with other fibers. Pure cotton is useful for projects that require structure such as purses and tote bags, placemats, and other utilitarian items.

| Fiber type | Description |
|---|---|
| Egyptian cotton | Longest cotton fiber, smoother and softer than other cottons. |
| Pima cotton | Cross between Egyptian and American cottons. Intermediate properties. |
| American cotton | Medium-long fiber, readily takes on dye. Available in widest variety of colors. |

==== Other plant fibers ====
| Fiber type | Description |
|---|---|
| Linen | Strong fiber, good for warm weather items. Wrinkles easily. |
| Bamboo bast | Similar to ramie, possesses an elegant sheen. Not to be confused with the more common bamboo rayon. |
| Hemp | Stronger than cotton, softens when washed. Wrinkles easily. |

=== Animal based fibers ===
| Fiber type | Description |
|---|---|
| Merino wool | From sheep. Softer than cotton. Retains warmth when wet. Breathability allows lighter weights to be good for summer wear. |
| Icelandic wool | From sheep. Strong but scratchy, best used as an outer layer. |
| Mohair | From goats. Lofty and luxurious. May feel scratchy, best used as an outer layer. |
| Cashmere | From goats. Soft, luxurious, expensive. |
| Alpaca | From alpaca (camelid). Very warm. Suitable for accessories such as scarves. |
| Angora | From angora rabbits. Very soft, tends to shed. Best used in pure form as an accent material, or blended with other fibers. |
| Silk | From moths. Single extremely long and fine fiber produced from each cocoon, so usually spooled in multiples before spinning. Exceptionally strong, lustrous, and shiny. Fragile, ages poorly, eventually "shattering." |
| Raw Silk | From moths. Fiber from cocoons after the moth has been allowed to emerge, resulting in a rougher fiber. |

=== Synthetics ===
| Fiber type | Description |
|---|---|
| Acrylic | Washes well, inexpensive. Good choice for beginners and for items designed for babies or pets. |
| Nylon | Strong, elastic, washes well. Not ideal for garments unless blended with other fibers. |
| Rayon | Made from processed cellulose (e.g. wood pulp, bamboo, seaweed) extruded into threads. Inexpensive and highly absorbent, natural sheen. |
