= Counter =

Counter or The Counter may refer to:

== Mathematics and computing ==
- Counter (digital), an electronic circuit that counts rising or falling edges of a clock signal
- Counter machine, an abstract machine used to model computation
- Loop counter, a variable that counts iterations of a software loop
- Jeton, a token used on a counting board
- Mechanical counter, a counter consisting of mechanical numeric display and components
- Tally counter, a button-activated counting device
- Web counter, software that counts the number of visits to a web page
- Project COUNTER, an organization that maintains a standard for reporting usage statistics of electronic resources
- People counter, a device used to measure the number of people transversing a certain passage or entrance

== Games and sport ==
- Counter (board wargames), a playing piece used in board wargames
- Counter run, an offensive play in American football
- Counter turn, an element in figure skating
- Counter (collectible card games), a small item used to represent certain objects or conditions in a collectible card game
- Jones Counter, measures distance bicycles travel

== Linguistics and typography ==
- Counter (typography), an enclosed space in a letter-form
- Measure word, a type of word in some languages
  - Japanese counter word

== People ==
- Nick Counter (1940–2009), American film and television executive
- S. Allen Counter (1944–2017), American neuroscientist, polar explorer, and university administrator
- See also Caunter, an associated surname

== Other uses ==
- Countertop, the flat surface of a counter
- Bar (counter), a type of counter used in bars for food serving
- Compter or counter, a small jail
- Counter, the part of a ship's stern above the waterline that extends beyond the rudder stock (see nautical terms)
- The Counter, a global hamburger restaurant chain
- Frequency counter, an electronic instrument for measuring frequency
- "The Counter" (song), from the 2004 album Tiger, My Friend by Psapp

== See also ==
- Count (disambiguation)
- Counting token (disambiguation)
- Counterflow (disambiguation)
- Opposition (politics)
