= Count (disambiguation) =

Count (or Countess) is a title of nobility.

Count or The Count may also refer to:

== People ==
Used as a nickname, not denoting nobility

=== Music ===
- Count Basie (1904–1984), American jazz musician
- Count Bass D (born 1973), American rapper
- Count Lasher (c. 1921 – 1977), Jamaican singer and songwriter
- Count Matchuki (c. 1929 – 1995), Jamaican deejay
- Count Ossie (1926–1976), Jamaican Rastafari drummer and band leader
- Count Prince Miller (1934–2018), Jamaican-born British actor and musician

=== Sports ===
- Michael Bisping (born 1979), English mixed martial arts fighter
- Count Campau (1863–1938), American baseball player
- Count Dante (1939–1975), American martial artist figure
- Count Gedney (1849–1922), American baseball player
- Count Grog (born 1961), American professional wrestling manager
- Ted Hankey (born 1968), English darts player
- John Montefusco (born 1950), American baseball player
- Count Sensenderfer (1847–1903), American baseball player

=== Other ===
- Count Cutelli (1889–1944), Italian-American sound effects specialist
- Count Gibson (1921–2002), American physician
- Count Suckle (1931–2014), Jamaica-born sound system operator and club owner
- Count Yogi (1915–1990), American author and golf performer
- Clay Counts, American politician
- Pertti Ylermi Lindgren, a Finnish confidence man known as Kreivi, the Finnish word for Count

== Fictional characters ==
- Count Binface, a British satirical political candidate
- Count Chocula, title character of an American children's breakfast cereal
- Count Dracula, title character of Bram Stoker's 1897 gothic horror novel
- Count Duckula, title character of a British children's television series
- Count Floyd, a fictional horror host who originated on the Canadian sketch show SCTV
- Count Jim Moriarty, a character from the 1950s BBC Radio comedy The Goon Show
- Count Nefaria, a supervillain appearing in American comic books published by Marvel Comics
- Count Paris, a fictional character in William Shakespeare's Romeo and Juliet
- Count Vertigo, a supervillain in the DC Comics Universe
- Count von Count, a character in the American television series Sesame Street, known simply as The Count

== Animals ==
- Count Fleet (1940–1973), American Thoroughbred racehorse and American Triple Crown winner
- Count Noble (1879–1891), English Setter hunting dog
- Count Pahlen (horse) (1979 – after 1987), British Thoroughbred racehorse
- Count Ricardo (foaled 2001), Australian Thoroughbred racehorse
- Count Turf (1948–1966), American Thoroughbred racehorse and Kentucky Derby winner

== Entertainment media ==
- The Count!, a Count Basie album recorded in 1952 and released in 1955
- The Counts, an American doo wop group of the 1950s
- "Count", a song by Jesus Jones from their album Culture Vulture (album)
- The Count (film), a 1916 film starring Charlie Chaplin
- Count (2023 film), a South Korean film directed by Kwon Hyuk-jae
- The Count (computer game), a 1979 text adventure computer game

== Other uses ==
- Count, the result of counting
- Count, an offence charged in an indictment
- Count (baseball), a baseball term regarding balls and strikes
- Mandatory eight count, a rule in boxing and kickboxing
- Count (SQL), an SQL statement
- Count butterfly, a species of the brush-footed butterfly genus Tanaecia
- Count data, a statistical data type
- Count key data, a data recording format

== See also ==
- Count Dracula (disambiguation)
- Count Me In (disambiguation)
- Count Me Out (disambiguation)
- Count On Me (disambiguation)
- The Count of Monte Cristo (disambiguation)
- Counter (disambiguation)
- Graf (disambiguation), a German title akin to Count
