= Counting token =

Counting token may refer to:

- Accounting token, historically used for record keeping
- Counter (collectible card games), a gameplay mechanic used in collectible card games
- Counter (board wargames), a gameplay mechanic used in board wargames
- Jeton, a token used on reckoning boards for calculations

== See also ==
- Counter (disambiguation)
