= Countenance =

Countenance is a synonym for face or facial expression, but may also refer to:

- Countenance divine, or divine countenance, a reference to the literal or metaphorical "face of God"
- Anglo-Soviet invasion of Iran, called Operation Countenance, the 1941 joint invasion of Iran by the United Kingdom and the Soviet Union

== See also ==
- Continents
- Count (disambiguation)
