= You Can Count on Me (disambiguation) =

You Can Count on Me is a 2000 American film.

You Can Count on Me may also refer to:

- "You Can Count on Me" (song), a 2010 song by Panda Bear
- You Can Count on Me, a 1983 album by Ray Griff
- "You Can Count on Me", a 2017 song by Ansel Elgort featuring Logic
- "You Can Count on Me", a 2018 song by Trophy Eyes
- "You Can Count on Me", a song by David Allan Coe from the 1978 album Human Emotions
- "You Can Count on Me", a song by Luv Bug entered by Ireland in the Eurovision Song Contest 1986
- "You Can Count on Me", a song by Shalamar from the 1983 album The Look
- "You Can Count on Me", a song by Spyro Gyra from the 1991 album Collection
- "Hawaii Five-O Theme", titled "You Can Count on Me" when performed by Sammy Davis, Jr.
- “You Can Count On Me”, a 1939 song by Duke Ellington

== See also ==
- Count On Me (disambiguation)
