= Mechanical counter =

Digital counters using mechanical components

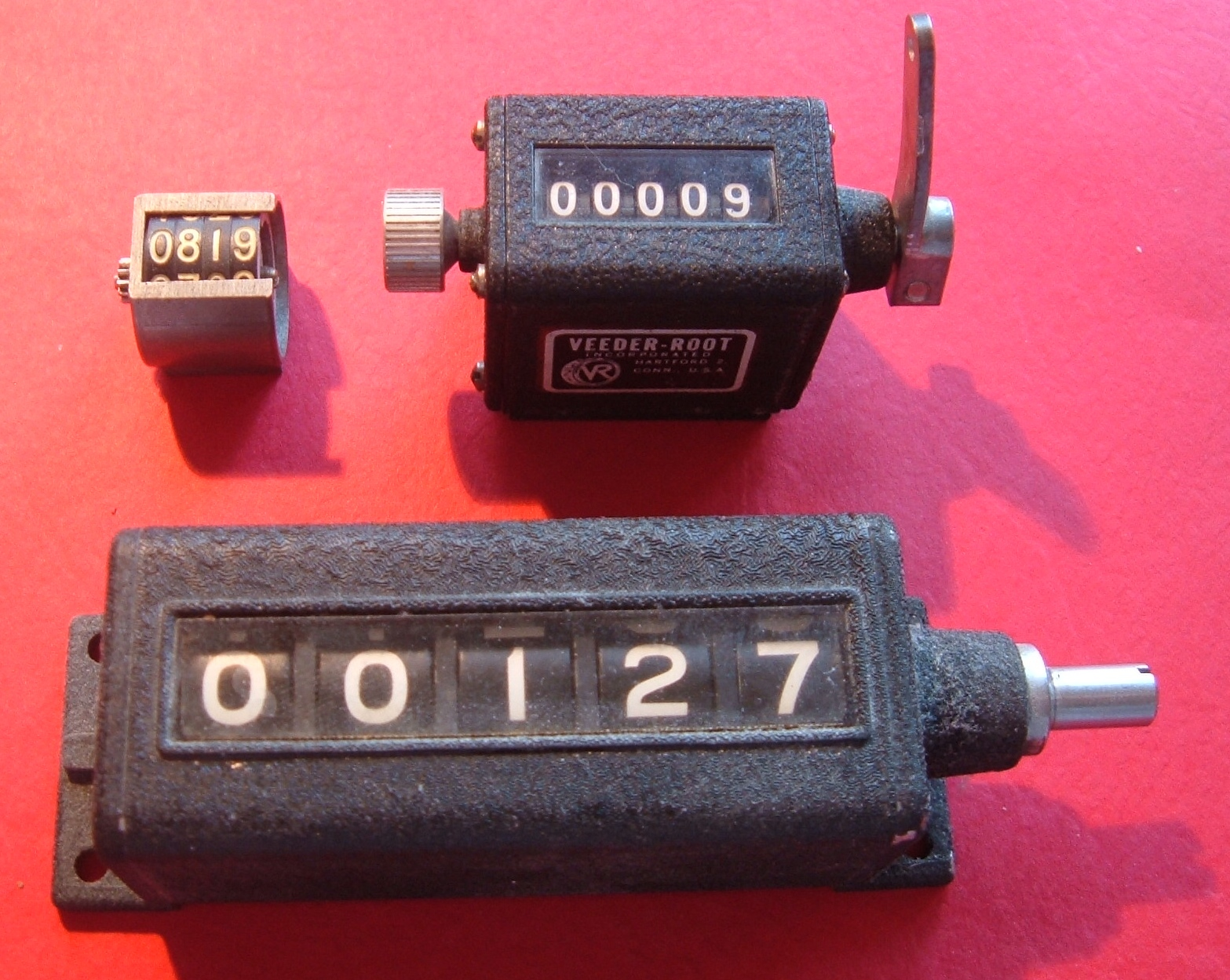
Several mechanical counters

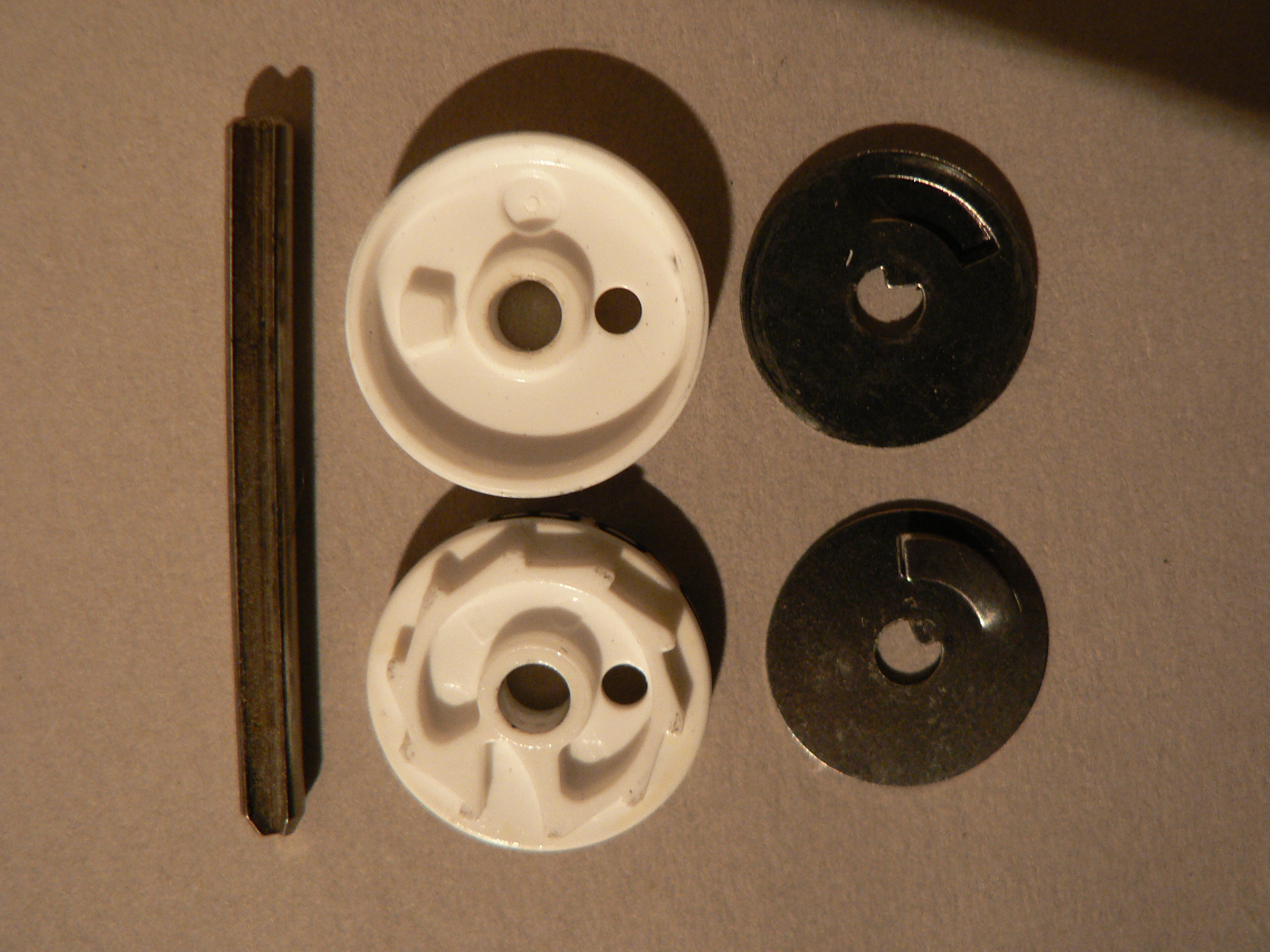
Mechanical counter wheels showing both sides. The bump on the wheel shown at the top engages the ratchet on the wheel below every turn.

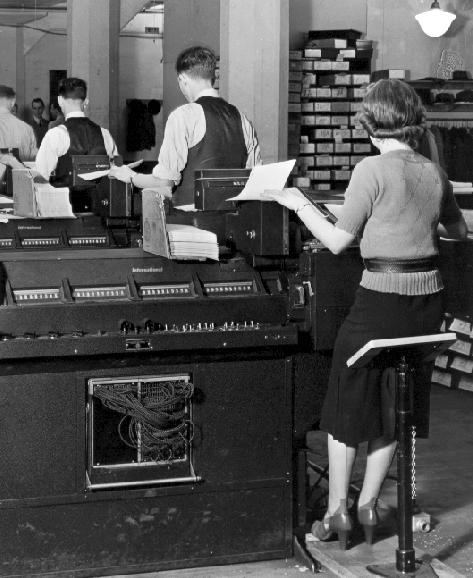
Early IBM tabulating machine using mechanical counters

Mechanical counters are counters built using mechanical components. They typically consist of a series of disks mounted on an axle, with the digits zero through nine marked on their edge. The right most disk moves one increment with each event. Each disk except the left-most has a protrusion that, after the completion of one revolution, moves the next disk to the left one increment. Such counters have been used as odometers for bicycles and cars and in tape recorders and fuel dispensers and to control manufacturing processes. One of the largest manufacturers was the Veeder-Root company, and their name was often used for this type of counter. Mechanical counters can be made into electromechanical counters, that count electrical impulses, by adding a small solenoid.

== History ==
An odometer for measuring distance was first described by Vitruvius around 27 and 23 BC, although the actual inventor may have been Archimedes of Syracuse (c. 287 BC – c. 212 BC). It was based on chariot wheels turning 400 times in one Roman mile. For each revolution a pin on the axle engaged a 400 tooth cogwheel, thus turning it one complete revolution per mile. This engaged another gear with holes along the circumference, where pebbles (calculus) were located, that were to drop one by one into a box. The distance traveled would thus be given simply by counting the number of pebbles.

The odometer was also independently invented in ancient China, possibly by the profuse inventor and early scientist Zhang Heng (78 AD – 139 AD) of the Han Dynasty (202 BC–220 AD). By the 3rd century (during the Three Kingdoms Period), the Chinese had termed the device as the 'jì lĭ gŭ chē' (記里鼓車), or 'li-recording drum carriage' Chinese texts of the 3rd century tell of the mechanical carriage's functions, and as one li is traversed, a mechanical-driven wooden figure strikes a drum, and when ten li is traversed, another wooden figure would strike a gong or a bell with its mechanical-operated arm.

== Examples ==
- Odometers
- Arithmometer
- Babbage's difference engine and analytical engine
- Mechanical counters were used to accumulate totals in tabulating machines that pioneered the data processing industry.
- Older fuel dispensers (gas pumps)
- Mechanical voting machines
- Tally counters
- Knitting counters
- Electricity meters
- Elapsed time meters
