= Tally counter =

Mechanical counting device

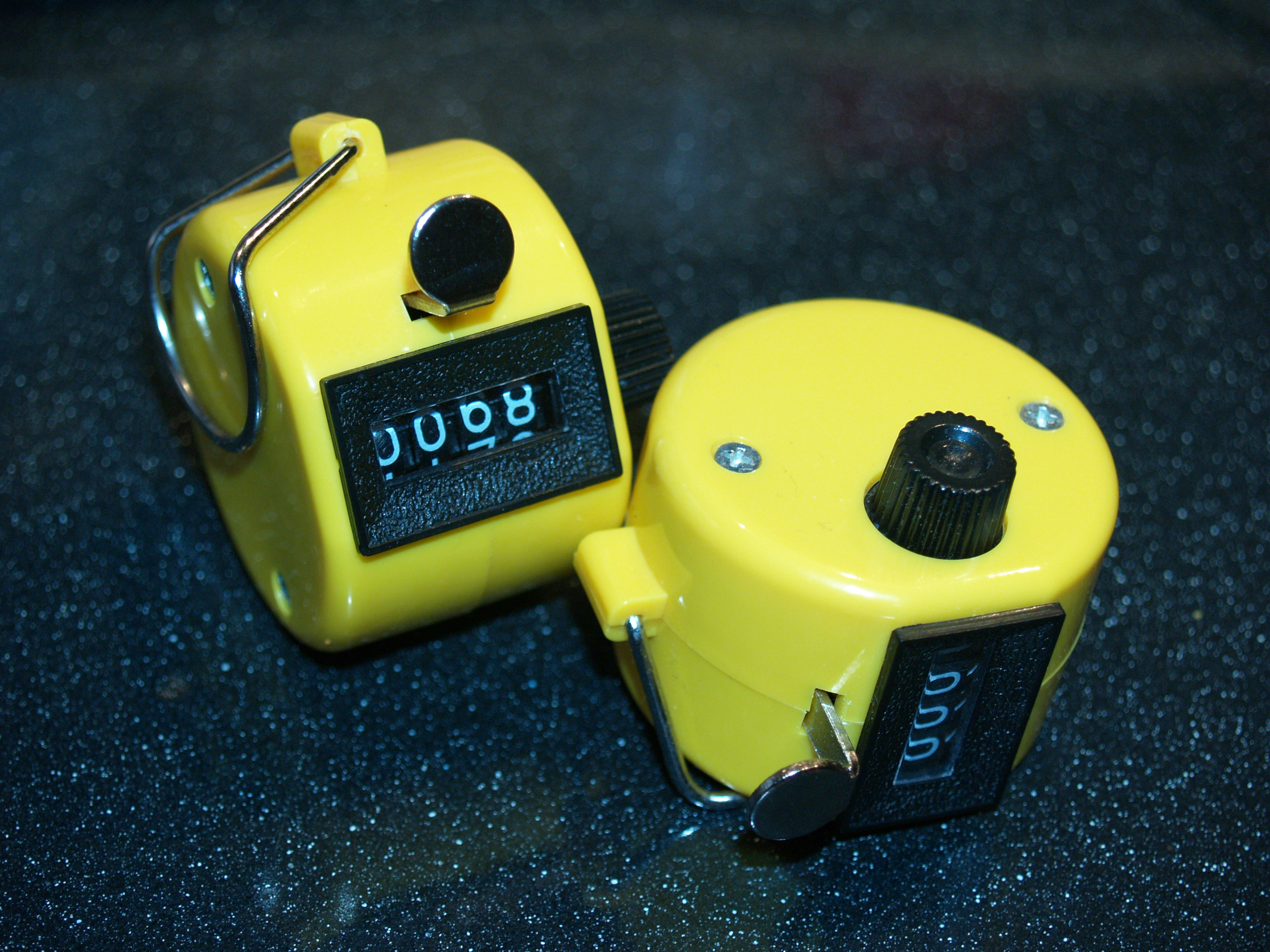
Mechanical tally counters

A tally counter is a mechanical, electronic, or software device used to incrementally count something, typically fleeting. One of the most common things The Tally Counter are used for is counting people, animals, or things that are coming and going from some location.

== Description ==
A tally counter is usually cased in metal and is cylindrical in shape. Part of the circle is flattened out and contains a window of plastic or glass. Inside the counter are a number of rings with the numbers from 0 to 9 in descending order going clockwise. Most counters have four such rings, allowing the user to count up to 9999. A metal ring may be attached to aid in holding the counter, and usually half the ring is bent to allow it to fold flush with the counter when not in use.

The counter is activated by pressing a button located above the screen. This causes the first ring to advance one number. After the count has reached 0009, then the second ring will advance one click and the first ring will come back to zero displaying 0010. To reset the counter, a knob is located on the side. This knob turns all the rings which are displaying the same number (usually zero). When the number displayed reaches the number on the remaining rings, then they will turn too, until the display is reset back to 0000. (Analog odometers in vehicles operate in a similar fashion.)

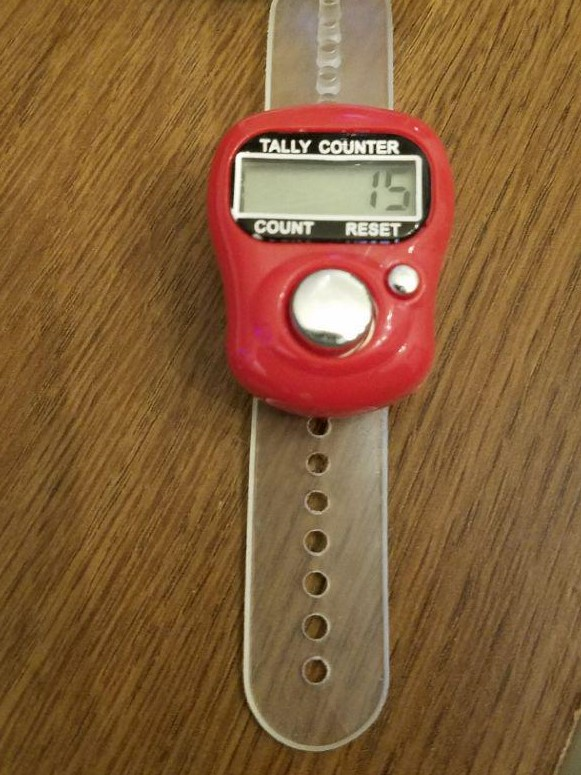
A digital tally counter

Electronic tally counters use an LCD screen to display the count, and a button to advance the count. Some also have a button to decrement the count, for example if a mistake is made, or if counting a majority.

== Uses ==
The main application of tally counters is as people counters. At concerts, stadiums, etc., a person will stand by the door with a tally counter recording the number of people that enter. At amusement parks, the rides can only hold a certain number of people, so the operator may use a tally counter to keep track of the number of people who get on the ride. They are also used for traffic analysis, scientific research, counting inventory and on industrial lines as well.

Tally counters have also been used in religions, often replacing traditional prayer beads. Shri Vidya initiates often use them to keep track of the number of repetitions of the Mula Mantra into which they are initiated. Sikhs may use them to keep track of the number of times they chant the Mul Mantar. Buddhists sometimes use them to count mantras, Buddha-recitations, etc. Gaudiya Vaishnava Hindus may use tally counters to keep track of the number of times that they chant the Hare Krishna Mahamantra. Initiated devotees are required to chant at least 16 rounds each day, each round consisting of 108 repetitions. In modern Muslim practice, prayers are sometimes kept track of using electronic tally counters as well.

A dial counter is a distinct type of tally counter, typically used in board games for keeping count of various status and conditions, such as scores, life points, current phase or turn order. They are commonly made from two circular cardboard pieces attached at the center so that it can act as a rotary dial, allowing it to rotate horizontally instead of vertically like other mechanical tally counters.

Row counters are another form of tally counter specialized for knitting when counting the number of rows or stitches needed for special patterns.

== See also ==
- Mechanical counter
- Row counter (hand knitting)
