= Count Ricardo =

Australian-bred Thoroughbred racehorse

- Sire: Principality
- Grandsire: Victory Prince (AUS)
- Dam: Shanghai Surprise
- Damsire: Imperial Prince (IRE)
- Sex: Gelding
- Foaled: 18 August 2001
- Country: Australia
- Colour: Chestnut
- Breeder: M. Ralston, L.J. Theodore
- Owner: P. Damjanovic, S.J. Damjanovic, S.J. Theodore, W.W. Burrell, S.B. Crawford
- Trainer: Stephen Theodore
- Record: 23: 3-2-4
- Earnings: $543,460

Major wins
- 2004 MRC Sandown Classic
- Last updated on 29 August 2011

Count Ricardo is an Australian Thoroughbred racehorse gelding who is best known as a bargain purchase from an auction sale. He was foaled on 18 August 2001 and bred by M Ralston, L J Theodore of Victoria. Count Ricardo was a chestnut colt by the unfashionable stallion Principality from Shanghai Surprise (dam of Surprise Pick) by the staying influence Imperial Prince (IRE).

His trainer and co-owner Stephen Theodore purchased him for just A$880 (including GST), who kept a half share and sold half.

Count Ricardo won his debut in a two-year-old race at Mornington, earning $7,150. During 2004, he won two more races including the Group Two Sandown Classic. Prior to the Group One Victoria Derby, Theodore decided to sell 15 per cent of his half-share for a reported $75,000 to part owners P. & S. Damjanovic, W. Burrell & S Crawford. Count Ricardo ran third in the Victoria Derby, 1.4 lengths behind the winner, Plastered.

He raced without any further successes in 2005, 2006 and 2008.

During his racing career, he started 23 times for three wins, two seconds and four thirds with prizemoney of A$543,460 - 600 times his original sale price.
