= Row counter (hand knitting) =

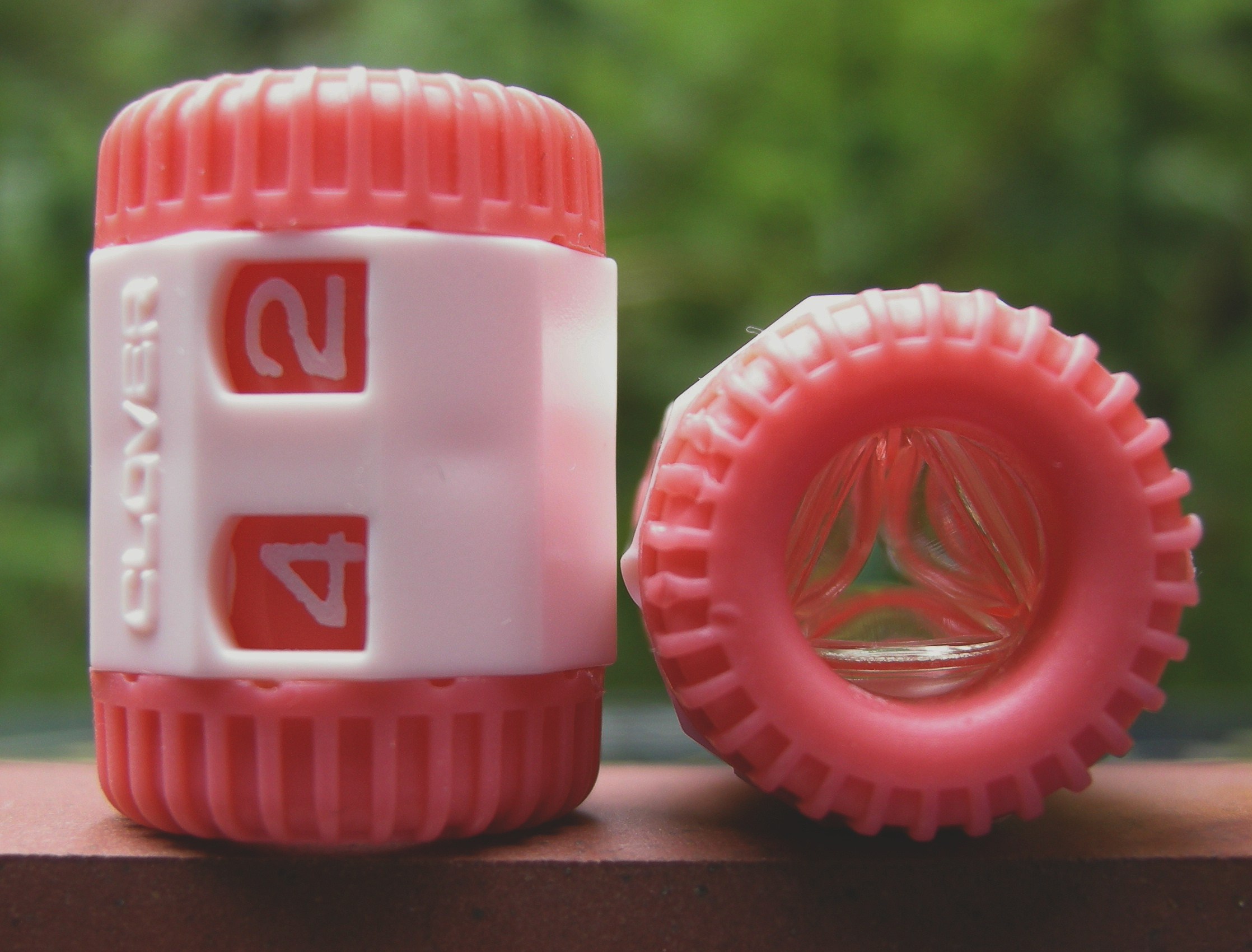
Clover on-needle row counters from Japan, 2000–2010

A row counter for hand knitting is a tally counter for counting rows or courses worked, for counting stitch pattern repetitions, or for counting increases or decreases of the number of stitches in consecutive rows. The first commercially produced one appeared on the market in the 1920s after the general public started regularly knitting from unfamiliar printed and complex patterns. Design variations include on-needle barrel-shaped counters for straight-needle work, stitch-marker counters for knitting on double-pointed and circular needles, complex counters which attempted to assist with decreases, increases and lacework, stand-alone hand-held counters in imitation of the hand-tally, pendant counters worn round the neck and online software for iPhones.

== Early tally methods in Europe and the United States ==
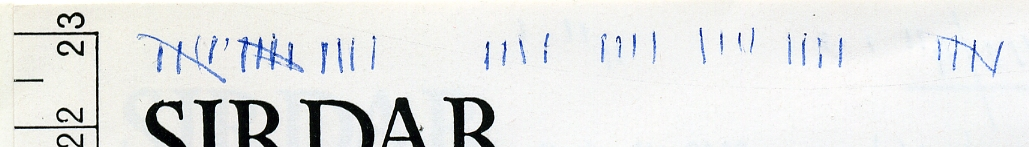
Five bar gate tally marks made by knitter on pattern, 1960s

Until the early 19th century, in Europe and the United States, groups of localised professional hand knitters specialised in a few well-known patterns in which keeping a tally of rows was barely necessary, since the pattern and expected size of the work were known by heart. From the early 19th century, when printed patterns were introduced for the recreational knitter, and until the early 20th century, woollen yarn had clear stitch definition so that rows were easily seen and counted, and a mental tally could be kept. However knitters could tally by moving objects from one pocket to another, or bracelets from one wrist to the other. For lace knitting and complicated increases, a knitter could write five-bar gate tally marks around the margins of a printed pattern.

== On-needle row counters ==
=== Flat-faced type ===
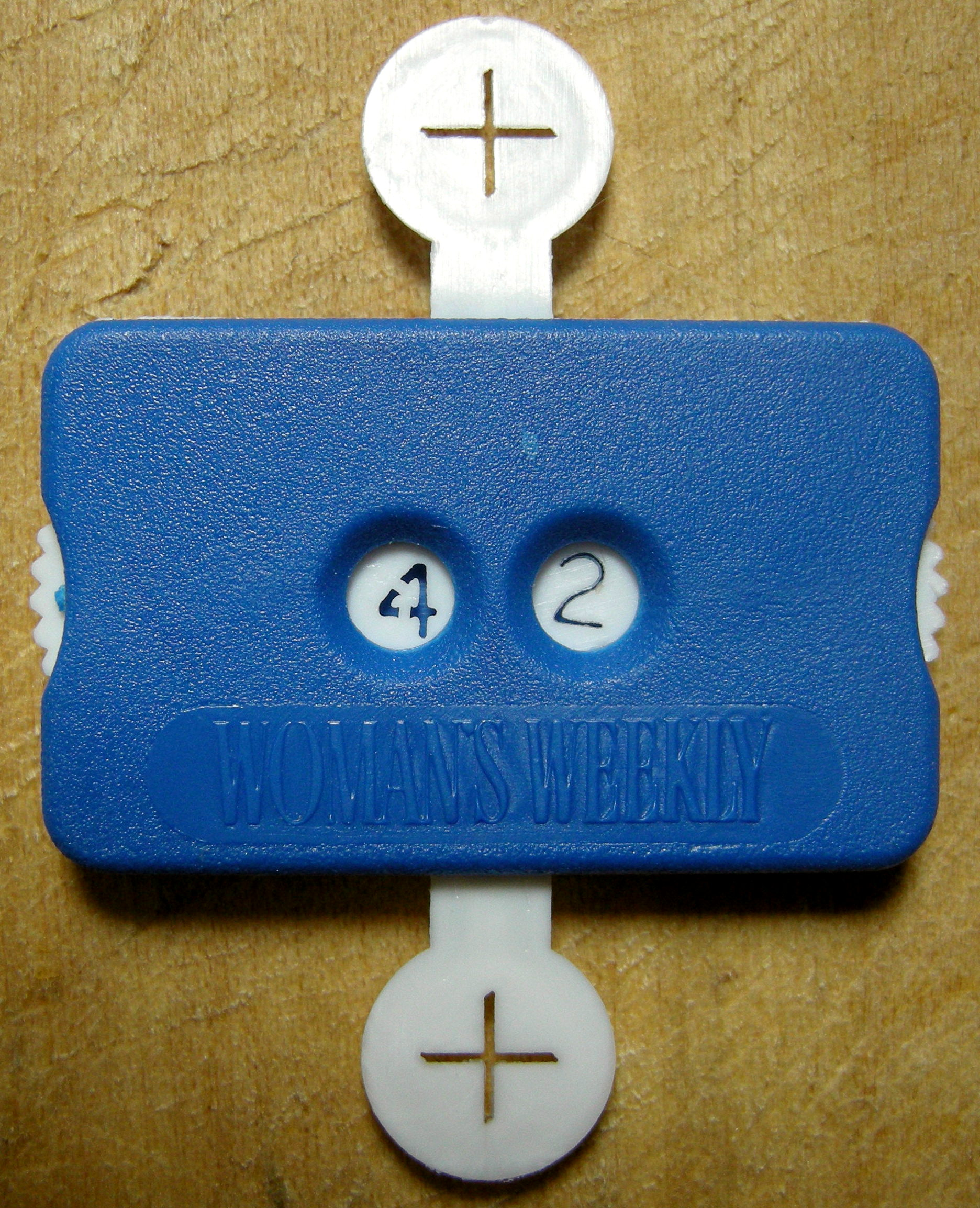
Woman's Weekly flat-faced on-needle counter

The earliest on-needle row counters seem to have appeared in the UK between 1920 and 1939, when complicated printed patterns increased in popularity among the working population. In the 1920s a 1 inch (2.5 cm) grey-brown enamelled unit was manufactured with two rotary dials on the front showing tens and units, and slots on the back for sliding onto a knitting needle. The front was flat and shaped like a figure-8, but was heavier than the back so that the unit hung downward from the needle, making the numbered face difficult to read. A similar bakelite unit was manufactured by Abel Morrell for sale in the US in the 1930s. (Note: See File:Abel Morrell knitting row counter.jpg.)

Around the 1980s to 1990s, Woman's Weekly magazine gave away a plastic on-needle knitting row counter of unusual design. It was presented as a self-assembly kit, in a small blue envelope with assembly instructions and a diagram on the back. According to the diagram, the gadget consists of (a) two blue front and back plates, pierced to show the numbers; (b) an inner white soft plastic frame to hold the number discs and to which are attached the two loops to bend back and thread on the needle; (c) the two number discs. So the disks don't spin on an axis; they spin within circular spaces in the inner frame. (Note: See File:Womans Weekly free gift row counter 002.jpg)

=== Rotary barrel type ===
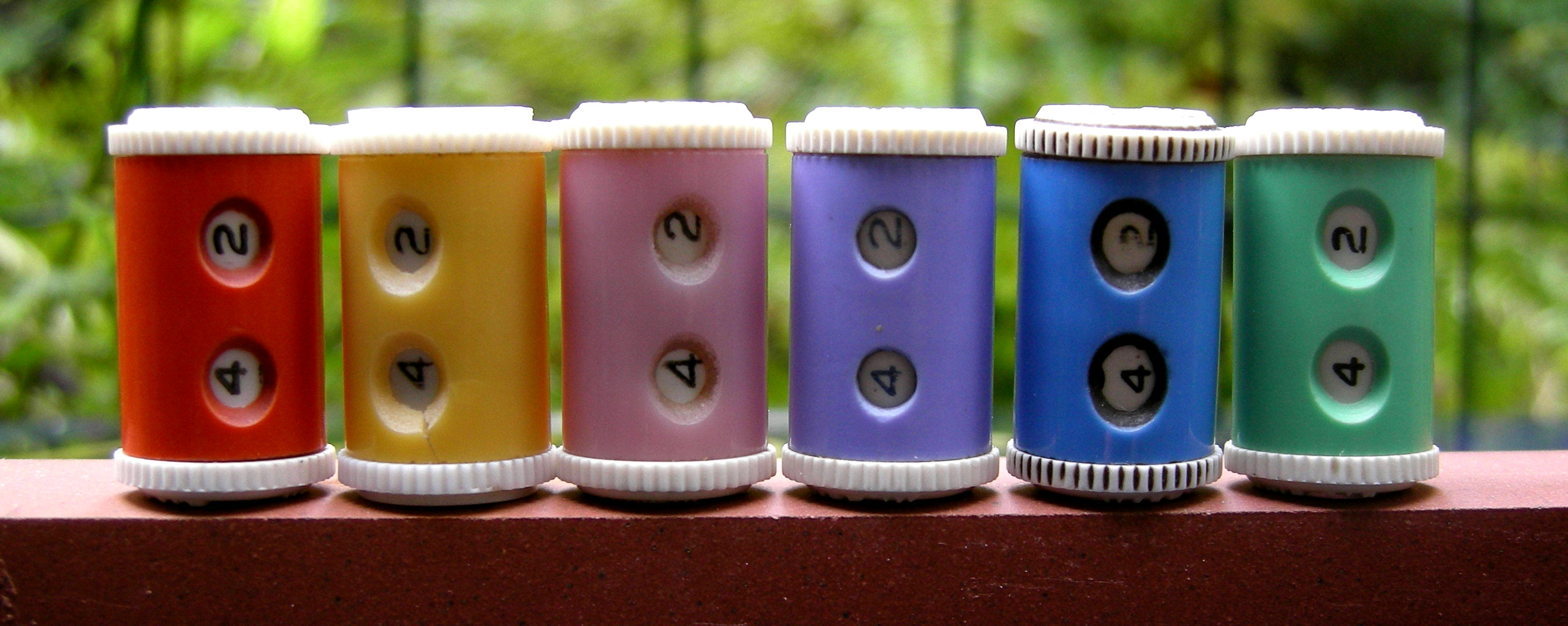
I.X. Products on-needle row counters 1950s

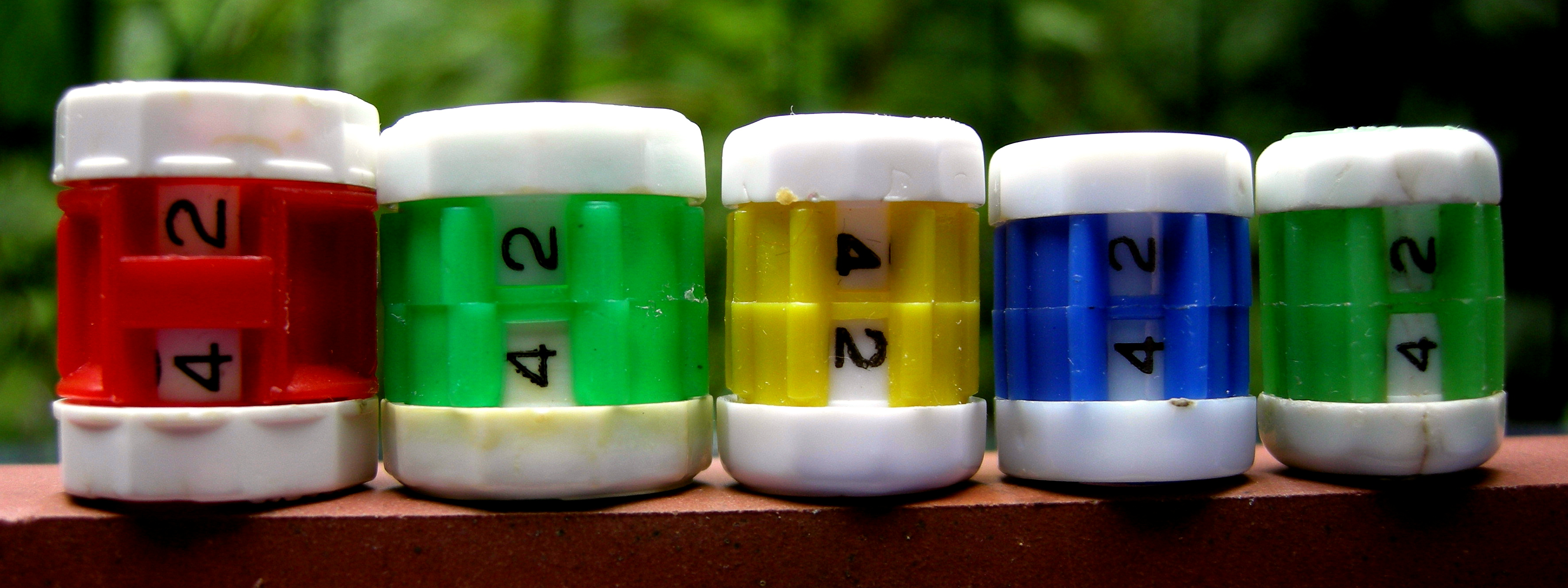
1970s Millward Ro-Tally counters

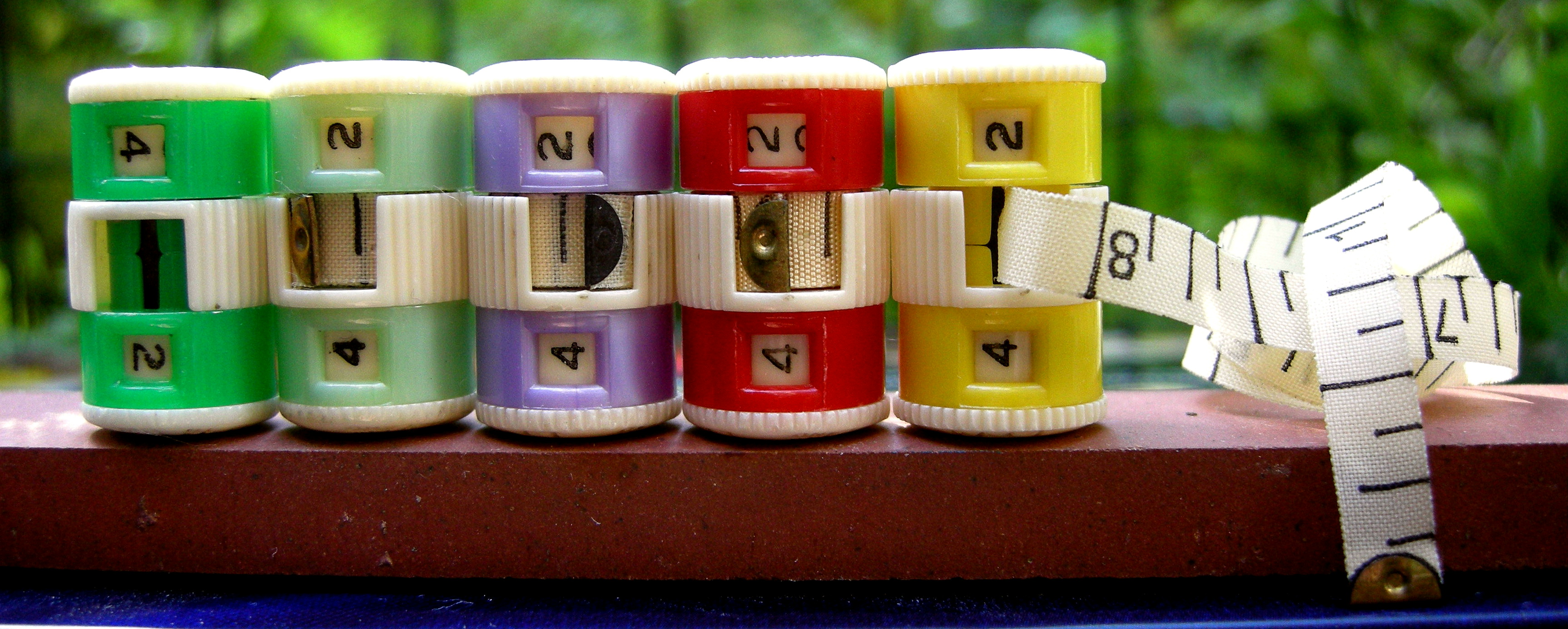
Compact luxury on-needle counters, 1960s

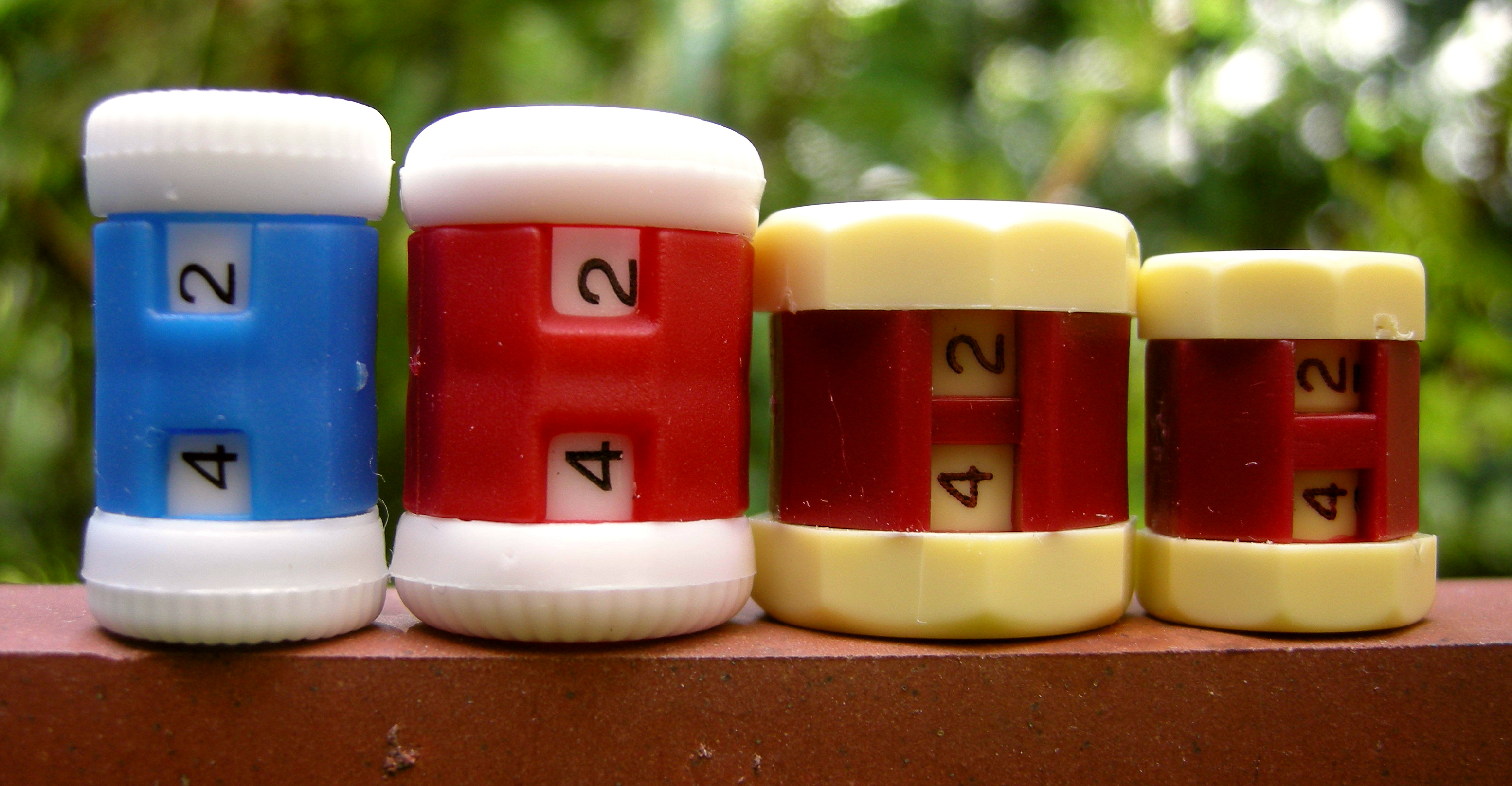
Counters used in US 2000–2010

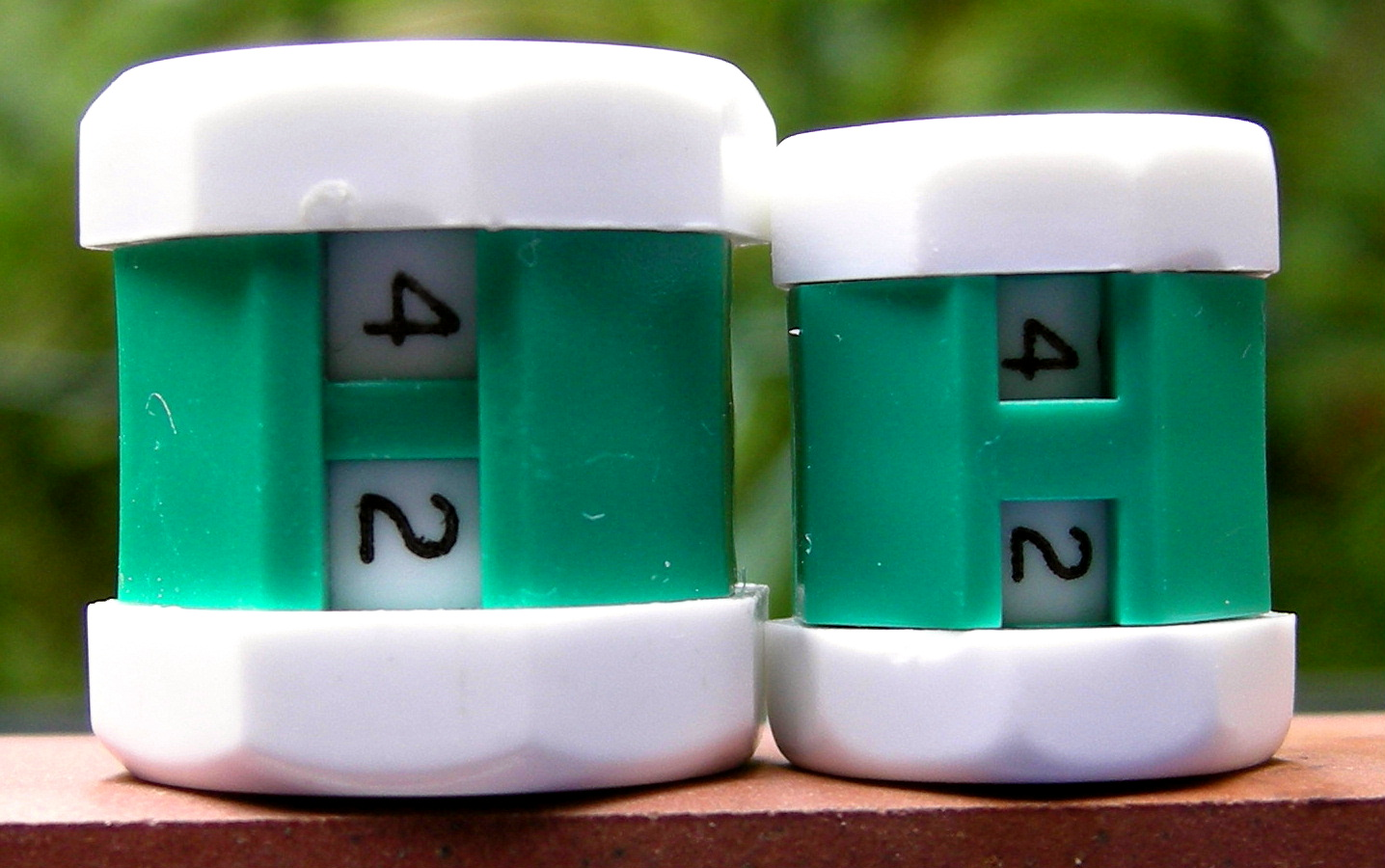
21st century polygonal on-needle counters by Pony and Whitecroft

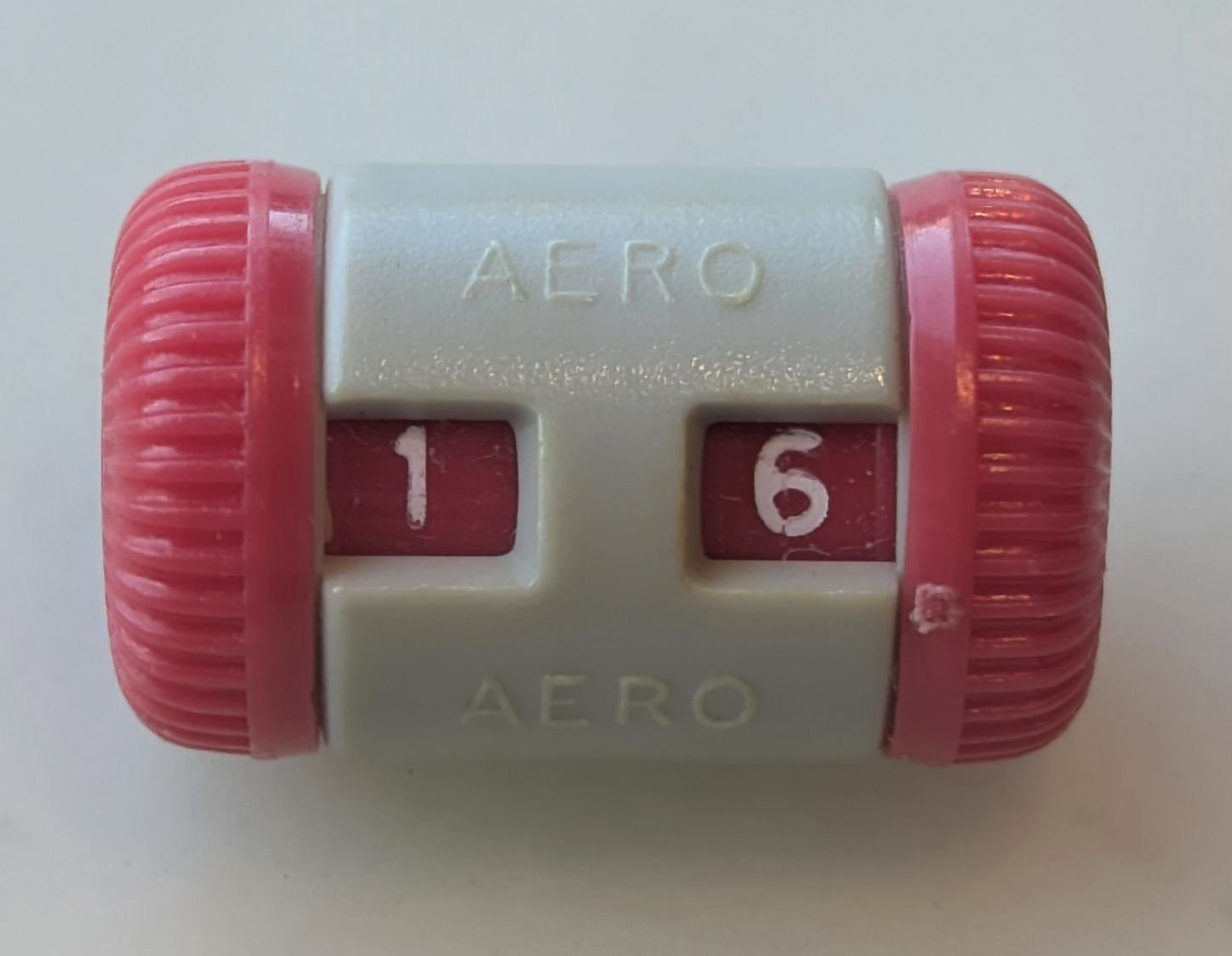
1980s Aero rotary on-needle counter

In Britain in the 1950s when the baby boom years following World War II caused an increased requirement for hand-knitting, I.X. Products produced a brightly coloured and marketable plastic row counter with patent number 424432. This was a barrel-shaped counter which sat in stable fashion on the knitting needle by the aid of a central metal spring. The assemblage consisted of a double rotating inner barrel and an outer fixed and slotted skin which was pinned to the central spring.

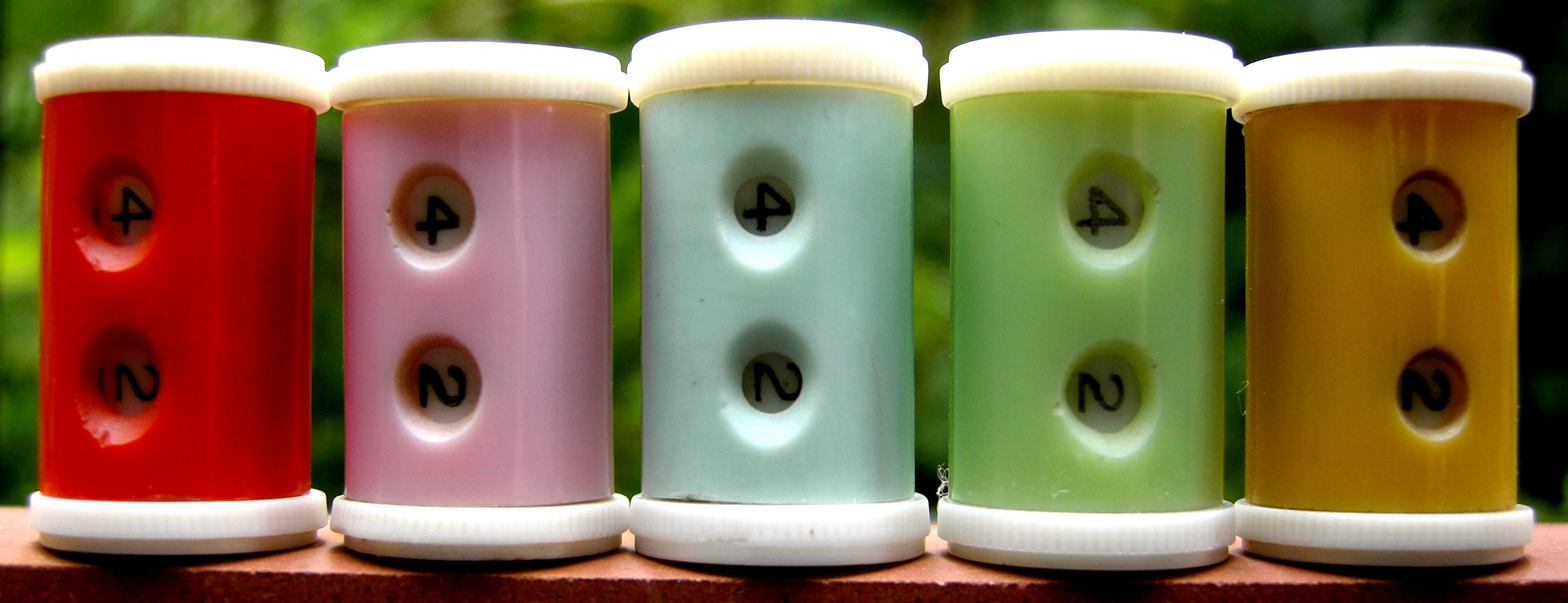
Millward Ro-Tally on-needle counters, 1950s

The two separately rotating halves of the inner barrel were printed with numbers, and the outer slotted skin rotated over the barrels, revealing a single ten and a single unit at one time. Precise engineering ensured that there was just enough ease of movement for the turning of the barrels, but just enough friction to prevent movement of the barrels while vigorous knitting continued. However the introduction in the late 1950s of double knitting yarn and the consequent popular use of thicker needles tended to damage the springs which were intended for needles of a maximum thickness of 3.25mm. This design and most of the barrel-shaped on-needle counters which followed it had a white or cream central barrel and a decoratively coloured outer skin.

In the 1950s and 1960s the UK knitting accessories manufacturer Millward produced the Ro-Tally, whose name was a pun on rotary. Its design was very similar to the I.X. Products version, it used the same patent number and the precision of engineering was improved, although the inner spring was still too small for 4 mm needles. The Millward Ro-Tally was re-designed quite differently in the 1970s in various sizes, of softer plastic with a plastic spring which fitted large and small needles. These counters were not precisely engineered, so depended on polygonal barrels and outer skin to provide sufficient friction to control unnecessary movement while knitting.

The Compact rotary row counter was manufactured in England in the 1950s to 1960s under a pending patent application, although the general design was similar in principle to the early I.X. Products version. It had the same precise engineering for control of friction, and central metal spring suitable for needles up to 3.5 mm. The basic Compact, however, had a central knurled grip-band, which made the gadget easier to hold and to turn quickly and precisely. The earlier version of the late 1950s to early 1960s had red numerals, (Note: See File:Counter 009b.jpg) and the later 1960s version had black numerals. (Note: See File:Compact row counter 1960s.jpg)

The luxury version of the Compact was presented in a gift box, it was priced at a guinea and became a contemporary collector's item, tending to be little-used due to impracticality. The assemblage included a thin and delicate 6-inch – later 8-inch – tape measure in place of the grip band. (Note: The tape measure showed inches but not centimetres, as shown in the photograph.) On this luxury version the tape-measure assembly caused the centre of the gadget to rotate independently, making it difficult for adult fingers to grip the remaining part of the stable outer skin to turn the main assemblage for use as a row counter. Some of the counters in this range featured pearlised plastic outer skins in various pastel colours. (Note: See File:Counter 005c.jpg)

Around the 1960s to 1970s Woman's Weekly magazine gave away a soft plastic on-needle knitting row counter of unusual but simple design. Two numbered blue-and-white barrels rotate independently around a central white spindle, which has a number-pointer at one end and a loop to thread onto a needle at the other end. The friction (to prevent the barrels rolling freely) is maintained by the tightness of the number-pointer and shortness of the spindle. (Note: See File:Womans Weekly free gift counter.jpg)

In the 1980s the knitting accessories company Aero produced its own rotary on-needle counter which had a distinctive red inner barrel with thick knurled ends, and a grey outer skin. The red colour of the inner barrel meant that the numbers had to be printed in white, and were more easily visible than the small black printed numbers on earlier versions. Aero later produced a blue and white version of the same design, with the name Inox printed on it. In the 1990s Wrights Boyle and Prym began to produce a similar design with white inner barrels and coloured outer skin which continued to be sold in different sizes until at least 2010.

In the 21st century until at least 2010, the manufacturers Pony, Whitecroft and Wrights each made a new version of the 1970s octagonal counter for sale in Europe, the UK and the United States. At the same time the Japanese knitting accessories supplier Clover was exporting a version of the 1980s Aero counter, with dark inner barrels and white numbers, to the same customer base, although at first they supplied a pink version to the UK, and a blue version to the United States.

=== Jewellery type ===
Commercial and home-crafted, beaded row counters appeared from 2000 until at least 2010. Some of these involved suspending jewellery from the needle and marking off beads as rows progressed. (Note: See File:Beaded row counter.jpg)

=== Stitch-marker row counters ===
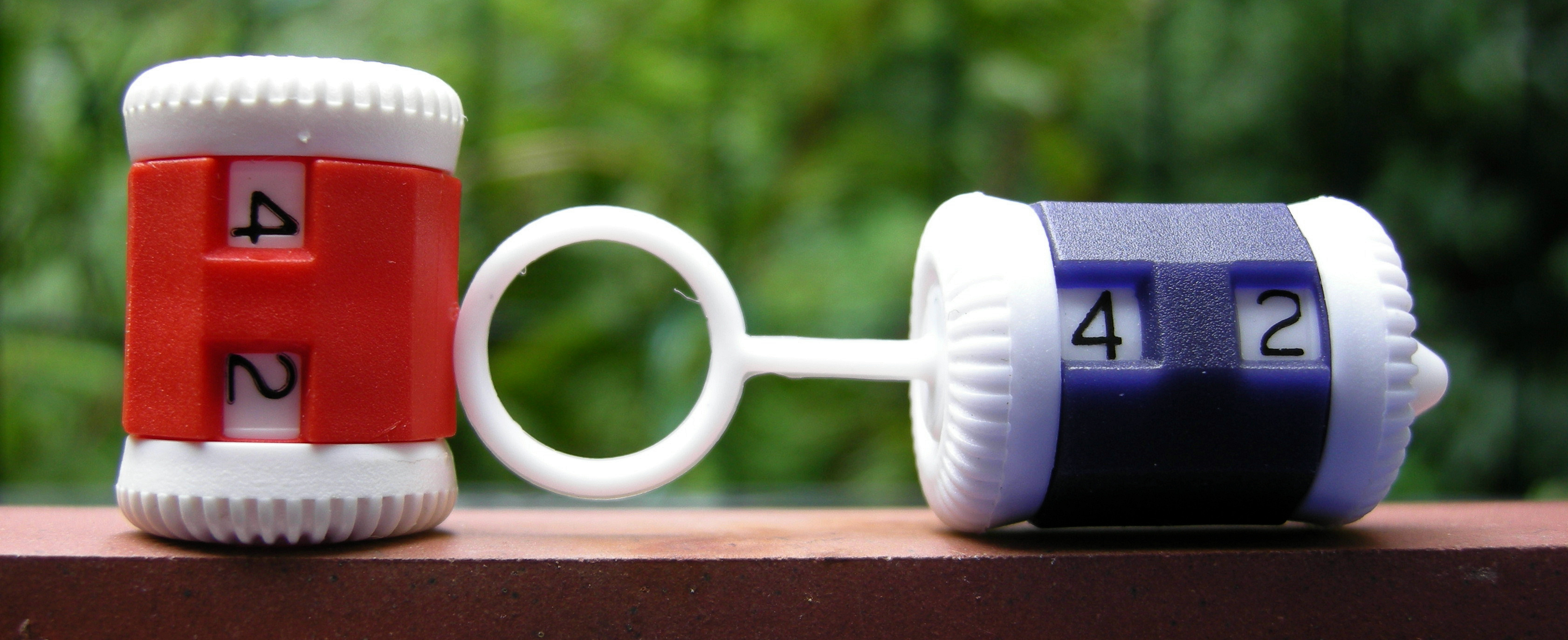
Stitch-marker counter

These tend to be on-needle barrel row counters which have been attached to stitch-marker rings. They are intended to be used with circular or double-pointed knitting needles. In the 21st century Prym has marketed a dedicated stitch-marker row counter, labelling it the Universal Rotally.

== Complex row counters ==
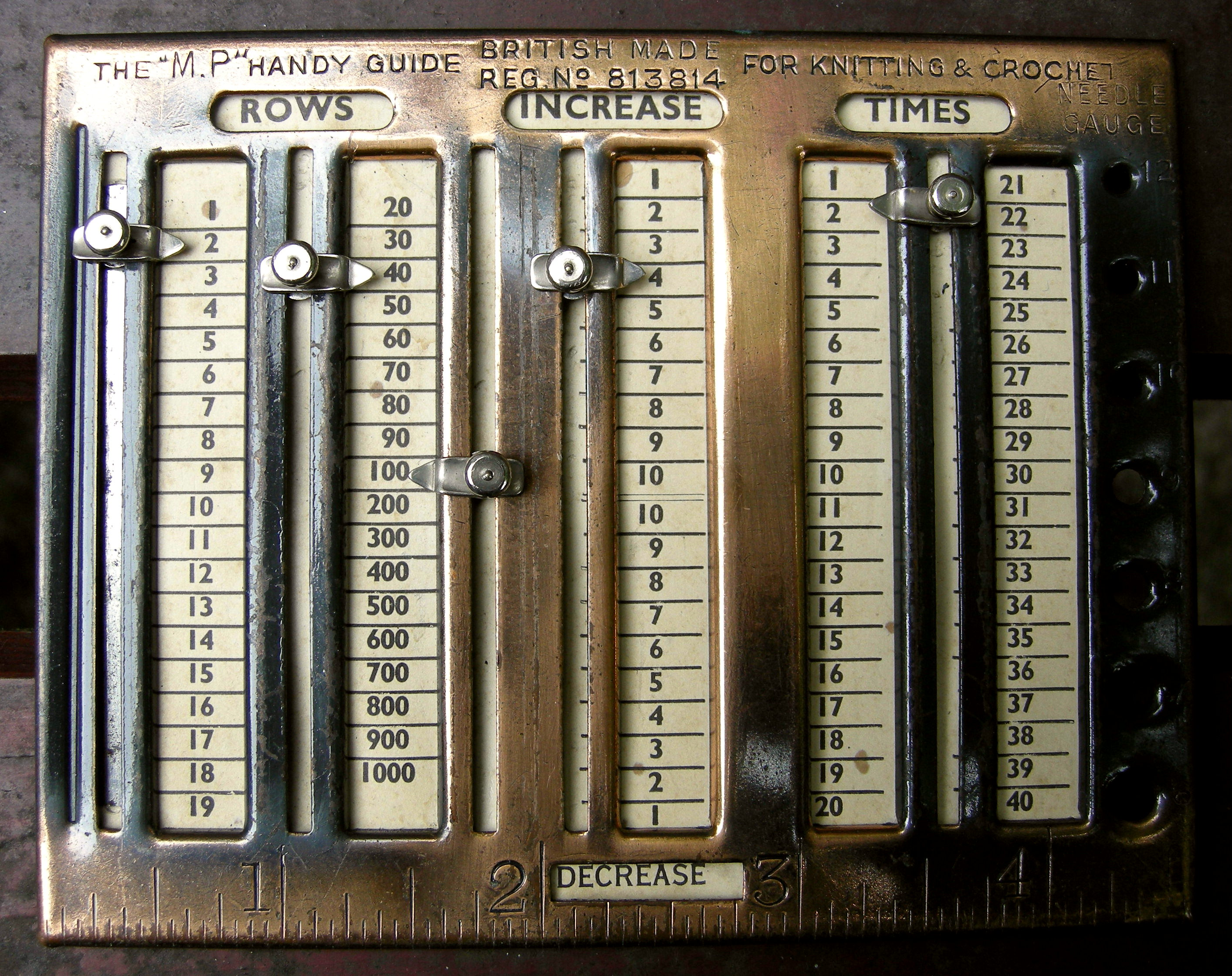
The MP Handy Guide 1936

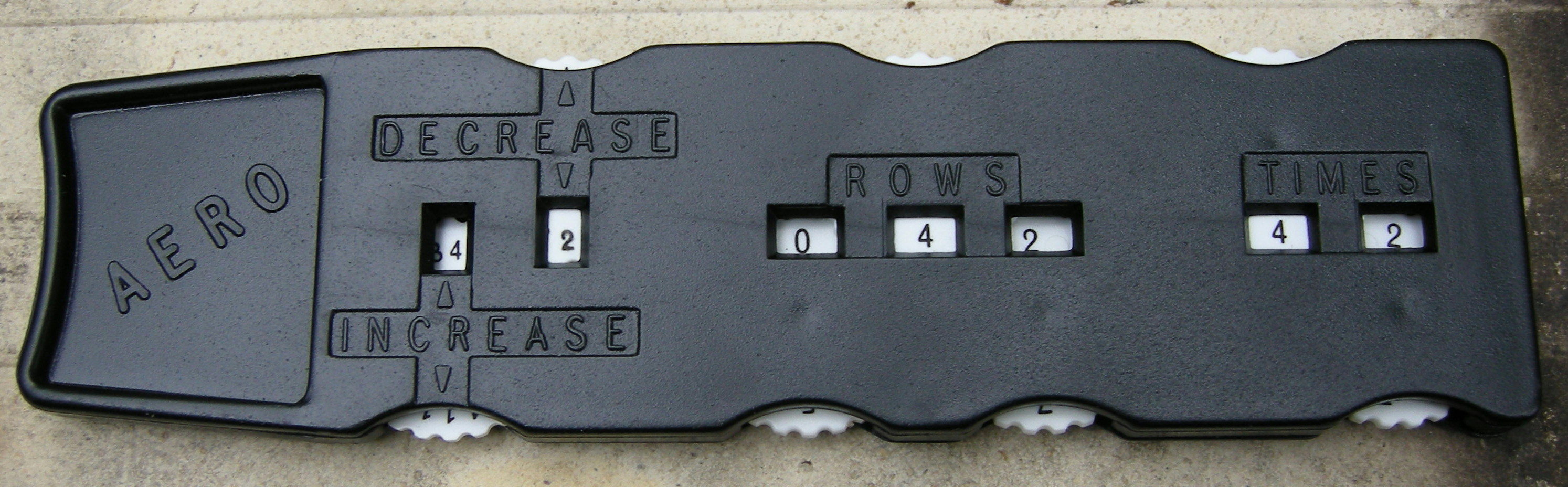
Aero complex counter 1960s

In 1936 The MP Handy Guide to Knitting and Crochet was patented under number 813814 and manufactured in Britain as a pair of rectangular flat metal plates sandwiching a paper card marked with number lists, and sliders with markers to record current row number, increase, decrease and times. However the metal slides did not work smoothly and could get stuck. The gadget incorporated a small ruler and needle gauge. There is an example of this counter in the Victoria and Albert Museum. The paper instructions pasted on the back carried the following legend:

"Rows: When knitting and suddenly called away, mark off the number of rows reached.

Increase/decrease: For casting on, or casting off stitches.
Times: To mark off the pattern when doing fancy knitting, etc.
Measure: Very handy when tape measure is mislaid.

Needle gauge: For correct sizes from 6 to 12." (Note: See File:Counter 041.jpg)

A paper card version of the MP Handy Guide was published with folded card sliders for the war effort under the auspices of the UK Ministry of Defence during World War II and was intended for use by people knitting gloves, socks and balaclavas for the troops. In the 1960s, The Aero Needles Group Plc of Redditch, England produced the Knitters Companion, a pocket version of the complex counter, consisting of a pierced bar of black plastic containing seven knurled, white, rotary, numbered discs whose numbers would appear through the piercings in the bar. As in the MP Handy Guide, the numbers were labelled Increase, Decrease, Rows and Times. It was supplied with a soft plastic case which was intended to maintain memory of the count by preventing accidental movement of the discs. In 1972, UK magazine Woman's Weekly gave away its own card variation of this, with the numbers on dials with rotary paper pointers to record rows, increases or decreases, and times. Like the MP Handy Guide it incorporated a small inch-ruler and needle gauge, but now added a tension gauge measure and centimetre ruler.

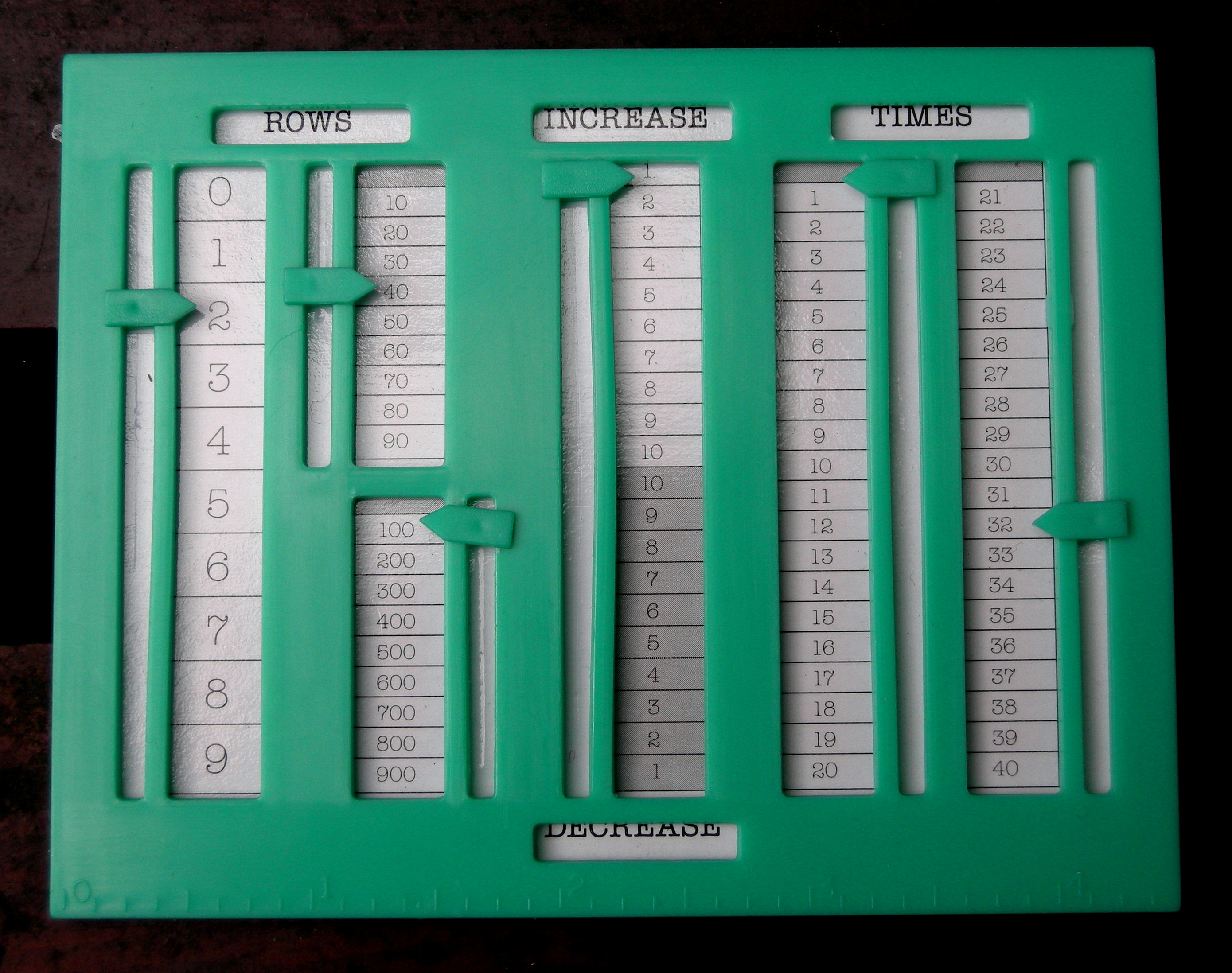
Plastic complex counter, 2008

In spring 2008 the UK magazine Simply Knitting no.39 gave away a green plastic version of the MP Handy Guide, without needle gauge or ruler and with a clarified version of the same instructions moulded onto the back:

"Rows: move the markers when you have completed each row.

Increase and decrease: keep count each time you need to increase or decrease stitches.

Times: use the markers when you need to make more than one set of increases or decreases."

This version illustrated the difficulty of mass-producing such a gadget cheaply: the inner card is easily displaced during assembly, thereby misplacing the numbers, and some of the sliders do not move easily.

== Counters made of card ==
These include the World War II card counter, and the 1972 Woman's Weekly card counter, both mentioned above. The wartime counter was a pierced card glued to a flat backing card; the front card contained strips printed with numerals and with slider-indicators. The numerals represented rows, increase or decrease, and times, as in previous complex counters; it also had a needle gauge and five-inch measure. The reverse contained instructions for use, and the legend: "a handy help for the war-time knitter". (Note: See File:WWII card row counter reverse 004.jpg for a picture of the reverse of the counter) The wartime counter was a version of the 1930s Bestway card counter.

In the 1920s to 1930s, various card counters were produced in the UK, including the Little Dorrit counter, (Note: See File:Little Dorrit knitting row counter 002.jpg) and the schoolgirl counter. (Note: See File:1930s Card row counter 002.jpg) From around 2006 Maik Remmers designed and manufactured in Germany a series of 3D card counters in the shape of skeins of wool, animals and abstract designs. These are folded and printed on back and front, with a pair of rotatable number discs sandwiched between the layers of card. The discs can be rotated to reveal numerals through two windows in the front layer of card. The outer surface of the card can be written-on with water-soluble ink, and the back surface of the counter contains a form where the knitter can fill in current row numbers. This is necessary as there is not enough friction to prevent the number discs from moving during storage.

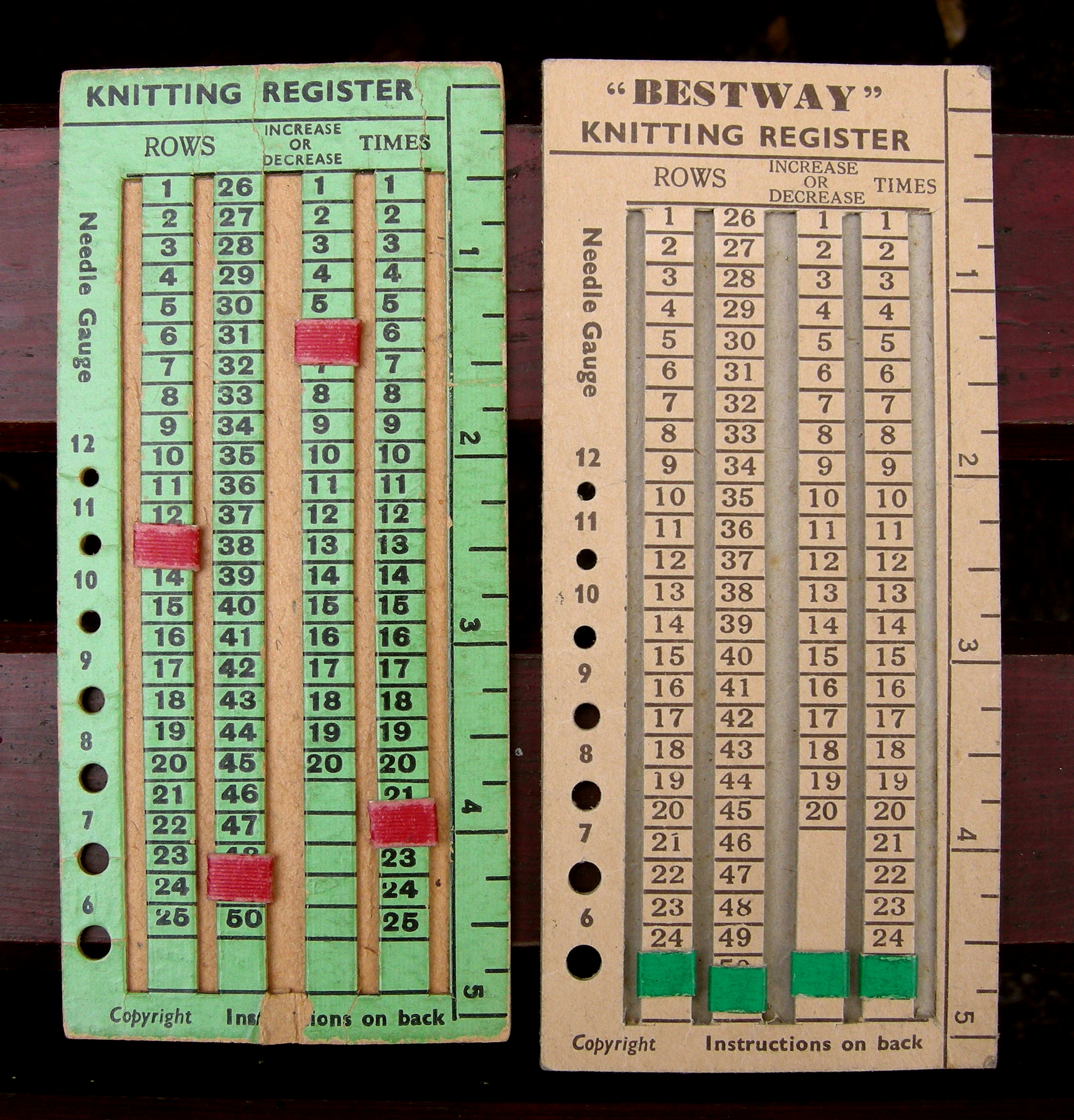
WWII counter and 1930s Bestway version.

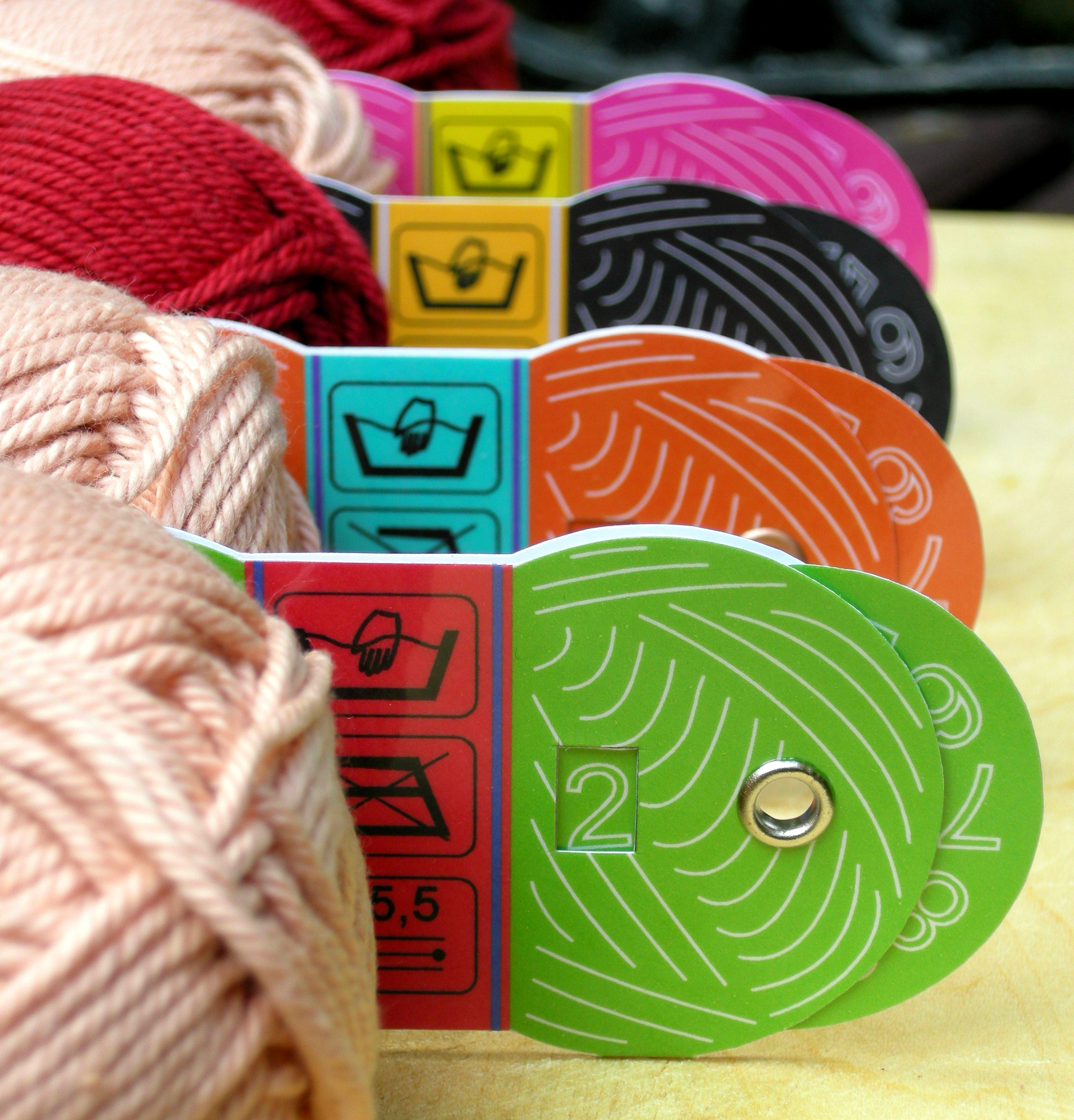
German counters, designed by Maik Remmers in 2007.

== Viyella needle gauge and knitting counter ==
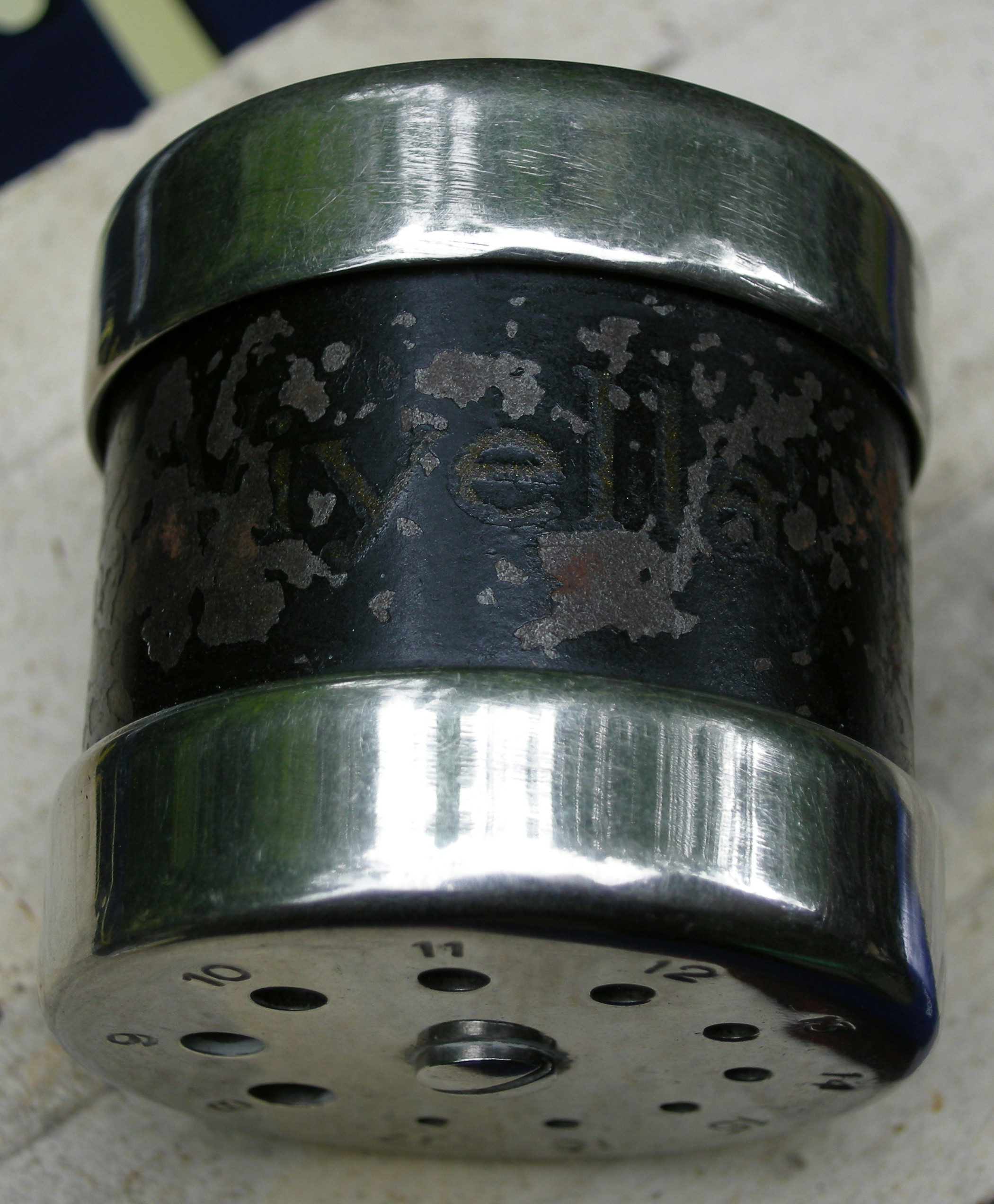
Viyella row counter

The Viyella needle gauge and knitting counter was created between 1936 and 1940. It is sizeable and heavy at 1.5 inches (3.8 cm) high and 1.5 inches (3.8 cm) across, and is enamelled and chromed. The two flat, chromed ends of the drum are pierced to form a needle gauge. The ends rotate on the enamelled drum such that red or white enamelled numbers are revealed through piercings in the sides of both drum-ends. There is a black and a white version of this design and each has a transfer picture of two children in the style of Mabel Lucie Attwell. A third form, in black and without the picture, was possibly an austerity version produced during World War II.

== Pony total knitting system ==
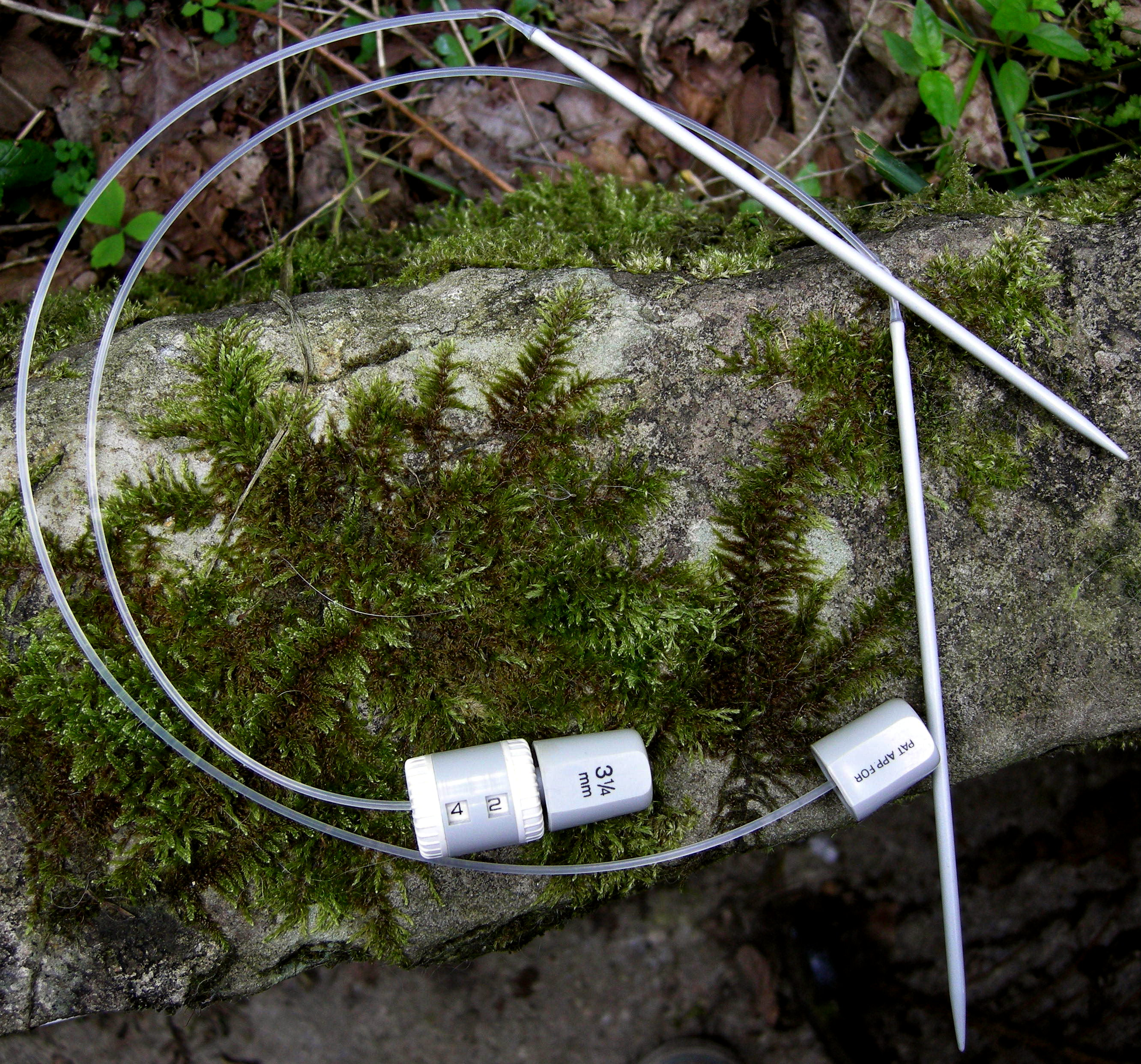
Pony total knitting system

The Pony Total Knitting System was manufactured by Pony in the 1990s, but ceased manufacture around 2008. It consisted of a pair of short needles with flexible 13 inches (33 cm) cables attached to the ends, so that heavy knitted items did not have to be supported on long, straight needles. The ends of the cables were knobbed to prevent stitches falling off, and one cable had an on-needle-type barrel row-counter affixed to the end. However, unlike the standard on-needle row-counter, this counter was not removable, and there was a counter on one of every pair of needles of this design.

== Handheld mechanical and electronic row counters ==
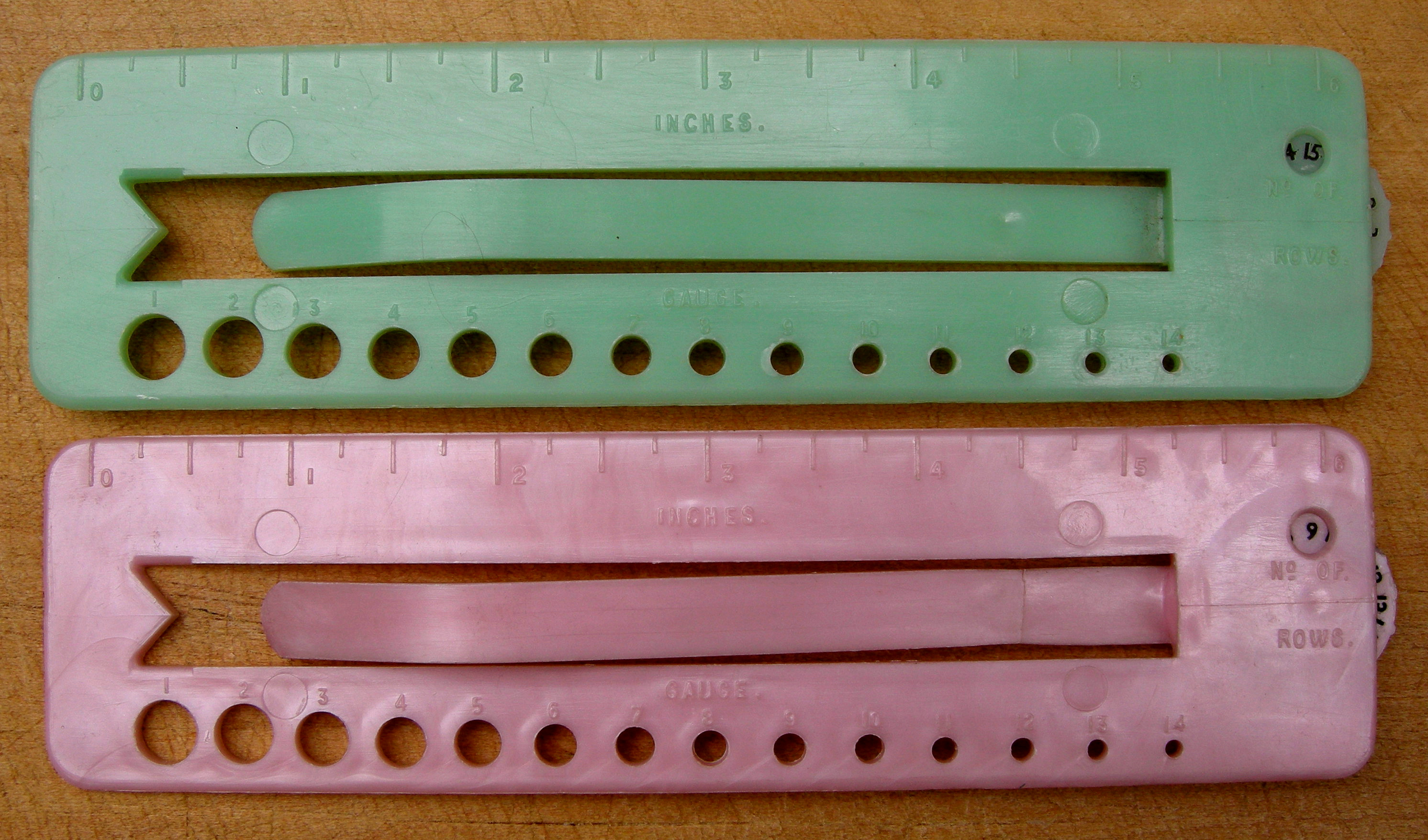
1930s bakelite bookmark counters

The earliest of these, alongside the MP Handy Guide and Viyella counters above, was possibly the bakelite knitting pattern bookmark made in England in the 1930s, which incorporated a counter for 1–16 rows and a needle gauge. The large, red, mechanical Kacha-Kacha handheld counter of 2000–2010 by Clover is robustly made for adult hands and for older eyes which require large, clear numerals. However it has no toddler-proof or drop-proof lock to maintain the count. Because it does not attach to a lanyard, it is more suited to the stationary workbasket than to travelling needlework. However, there is a similar design with a lock manufactured by KA in pink plastic for sale in the United States in the early 21st century, at least until 2010.

=== Pendant knitting counters ===
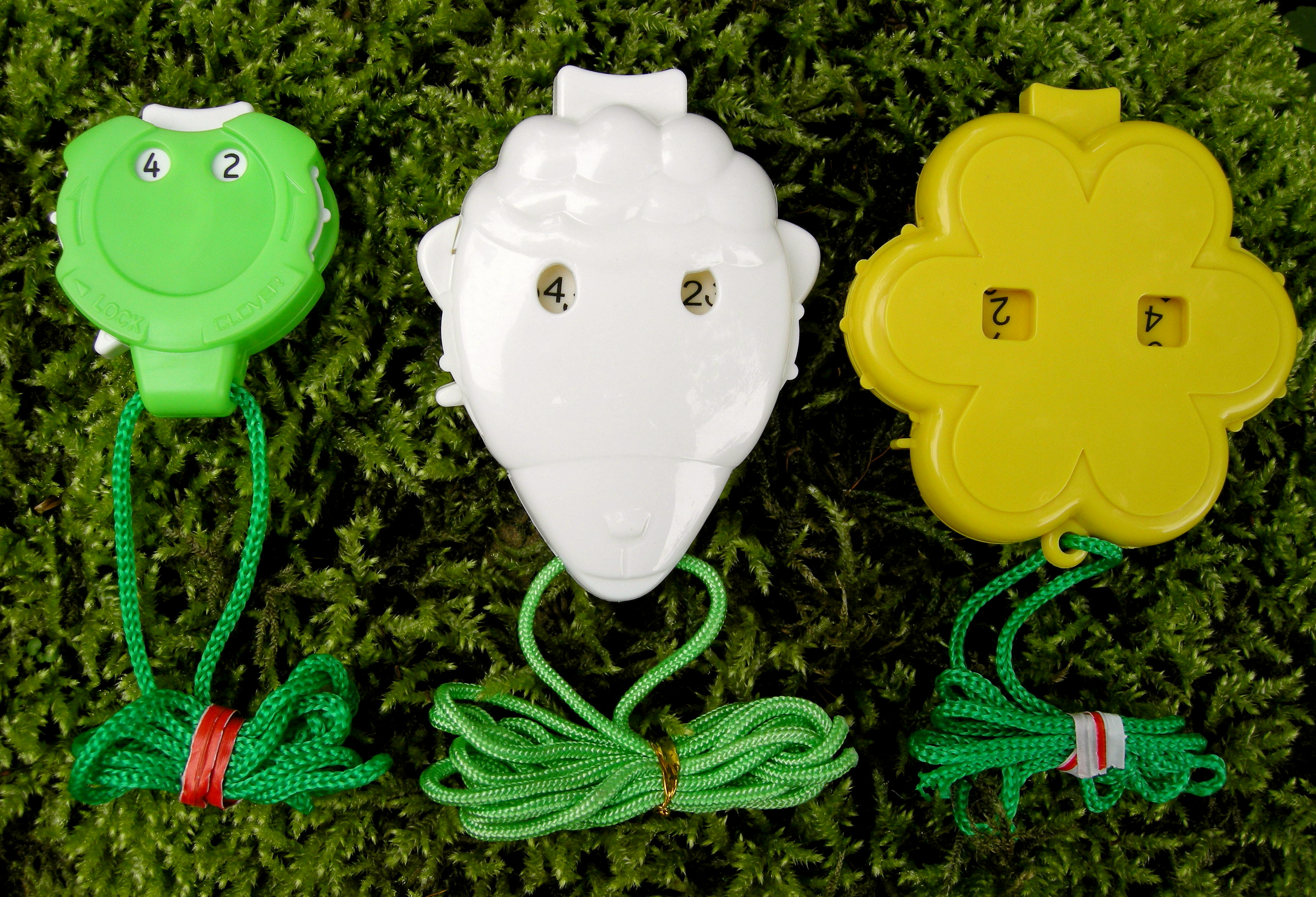
Pendant counters

In the 21st century and at least until 2010, the Japanese company Clover was producing the bright green pendant Mini Kacha-Kacha which is designed like a hand-held mechanical tally counter, but is oriented upside-down on a neck pendant for easy reading by the user. It has a button to advance the numbers singly, access to the knurled number rings for adjustment of numbers, and a lock to prevent interference by the user dropping the gadget or by children playing with it. On this type of gadget it has been possible for the manufacturer to make the numbers larger and therefore easier to read than on the on-needle counter, which needs to be small. In August 2007 the UK magazine Simply Knitting no.32 gave away a free pendant knitting counter in a form of a white sheep, and in June 2010 the same magazine no.67 gave away another one in the shape of a yellow flower. Unfortunately the numerals on the yellow flower version were oriented incorrectly, causing inconvenience for the wearer of the pendant.

=== Electronic pendant knitting counters ===
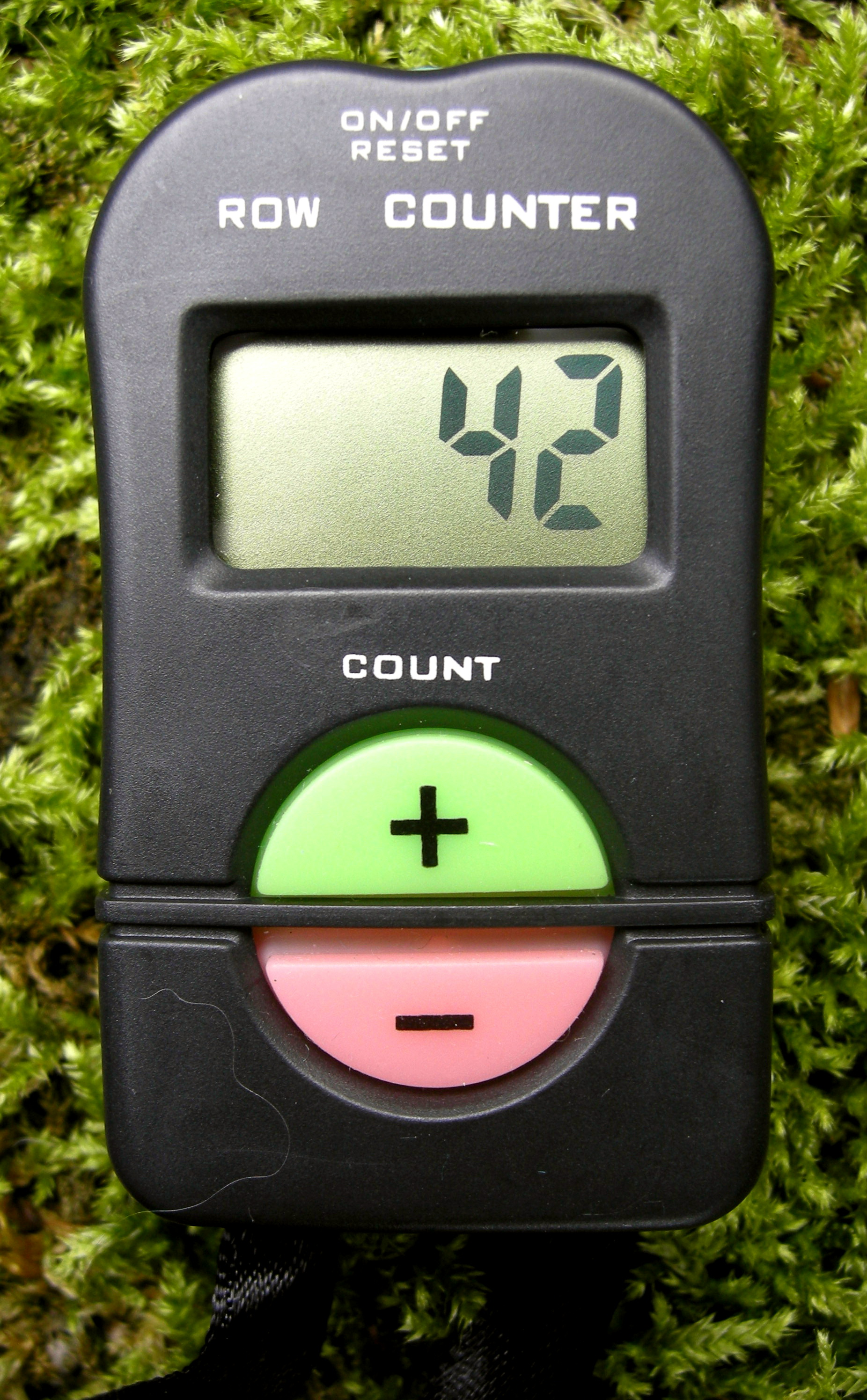
Electronic counter

The pendant Electronic Row Counter was produced in the early 21st century and was sold in the United States at least until 2010. Its LCD counts up to 4 digits, whereas all foregoing knitting row counters were limited to 2 digits. It has add- and subtract-buttons which allow the user to count forwards and backwards in increments of one with an audible beep at each press, and the on-off button can be used to reset the count to zero. Because there is no memory facility, the counter must be left turned on if the count is to be maintained; however the gadget's instructions say that the battery will last for over seven months. There is no lock so that the maintained count is vulnerable to playing children. The more complex version of this counter, the Electronic Row Counter Plus, has ceased manufacture.

== Row counter software online ==
=== Applications for iPhone ===
The Knit Counter Lite, Knit Counter and Knit Row Counter are applications downloadable for iTunes which can be used on iPhone. JKnit Knitting Project Assistant is a similar application for iPhone, and so is Knitbuddy which has been renamed Vogue Knitting iPhone App. My Row Counter enables the knitter to count rows while reading a knitting pattern.

=== Applications for PC ===
The Lo-Fat Row Counter is a basic online facility designed in 2008 for PC.

=== Applications for Android ===
The Knitting Buddy application is downloadable from the Google Play Store, and so is the Row Counter application.

== Row counter patents ==
Two patents for row counters were recorded online in 1982.

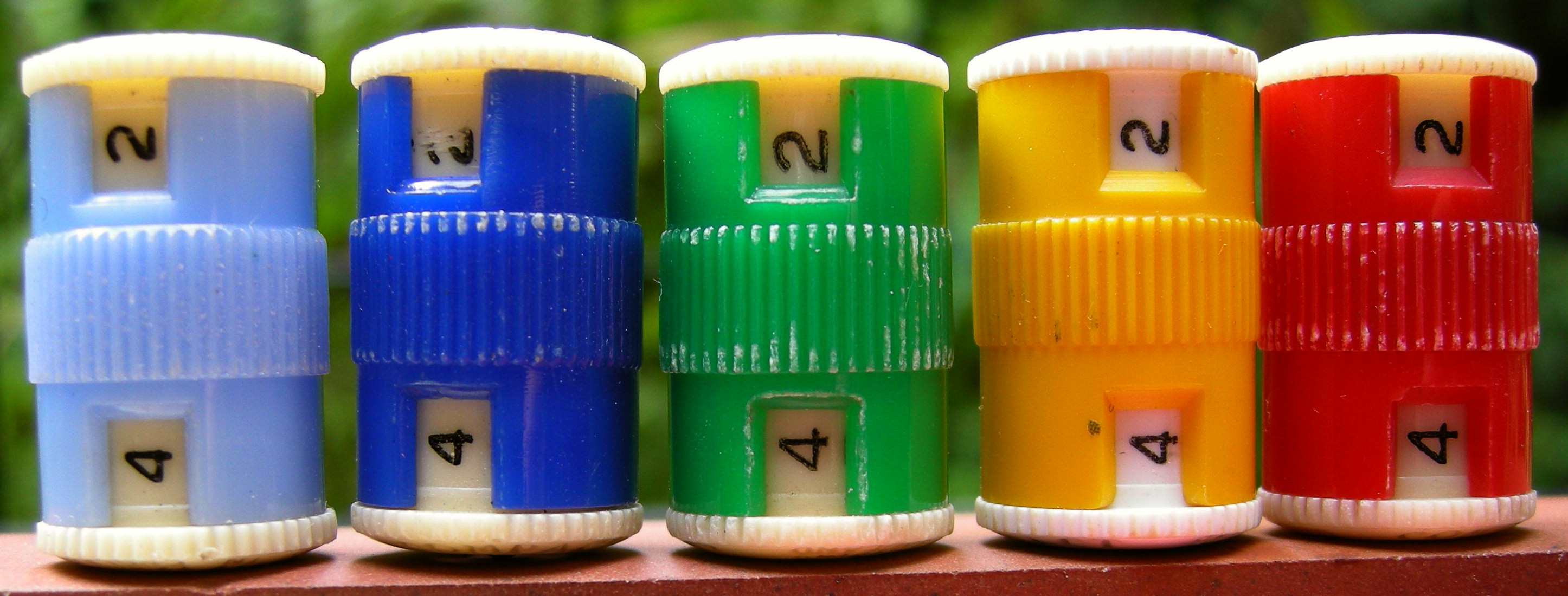
Compact on-needle barrel row counters, 1960s. The numerals are lightly printed, and rub off easily

== See also ==
- Tally counter
