= Counterflow =

Counterflow may refer to:

- Countercurrent exchange, where two flowing bodies flowing in opposite directions to each other exchange, for example, heat
- Counterflow lane a lane in which traffic flows in the opposite direction
- Counterflow Centrifugation Elutriation (CCE) a cell separating technique
- Counterflow in Cooling tower
  - and Cooling tower's contact fill, of towers that wind streams vertically upward
- Counterflow steam engine, such as Uniflow steam engine
- Counterflow heat exchanger in Cryocooler or Recuperator
- Counterflow in quantum turbulence
- Counterflow Recordings, founded by Induce (musician)
- Counterflow (EP), by Victoria Modesta (2016)
