= Count Me Out =

Count Me Out might refer to:

- Count Me Out (1938 film), a 1938 Merrie Melodies animated short starring Egghead.
- Count Me Out (1997 film), a 1997 Icelandic film
- "Count Me Out" (New Edition song), 1985
- "Count Me Out" (Blood Red Shoes song), from Fire like This, 2010
- Count Me Out (Kendrick Lamar song), from Mr. Morale & the Big Steppers, 2022
- "Count Me Out" (Lil Tecca song), from We Love You Tecca, 2019
- "Count Me Out" (CSI: Miami), a television episode
- CountMeOut.ie, a website which assisted Irish ex-Catholics to formally defect and apostatize from the Roman Catholic Church
