= Count On Me =

Count On Me may refer to:

== Albums and EPs ==
- Count On Me (album), by Judah Kelly, 2017
- Count On Me, an album by Julie Grant, 1994
- Count On Me, an album by Robin Meade, 2013
- Count On Me (EP), an EP by Jay Park, 2010

== Songs ==
- "Count On Me" (Brockhampton song), 2021
- "Count On Me" (Bruno Mars song), 2011
- "Count On Me" (Chase & Status song), featuring Moko, 2013
- "Count On Me" (Jefferson Starship song), 1978
- "Count On Me" (Judah Kelly song), 2017
- "Count On Me" (The Statler Brothers song), 1986
- "Count On Me" (Whitney Houston and CeCe Winans song), 1996
- "Count On Me", a song first sung by Frank Sinatra for the 1949 film, On the Town
- "Count On Me", a song by Fra Lippo Lippi from The Colour Album
- "Count On Me", a song by Default from the album One Thing Remains
- "Count On Me", a song by Glenn Campbell from the album Rhinestone Cowboy
- "Count On Me", a song by Gorilla Zoe from the album Welcome to the Zoo
- "Count On Me", a song by Los Kumbia Kings from the album 4
- "Count On Me", a demo song by Alan Menken for Disney's film Aladdin from album The Music Behind the Magic
- "Count On Me", a song by Aespa from the EP Rich Man

== See also ==
- You Can Count On Me (disambiguation)
