= Count Yogi =

American golfer and author (1915–1990)

Count Hillary Yogi
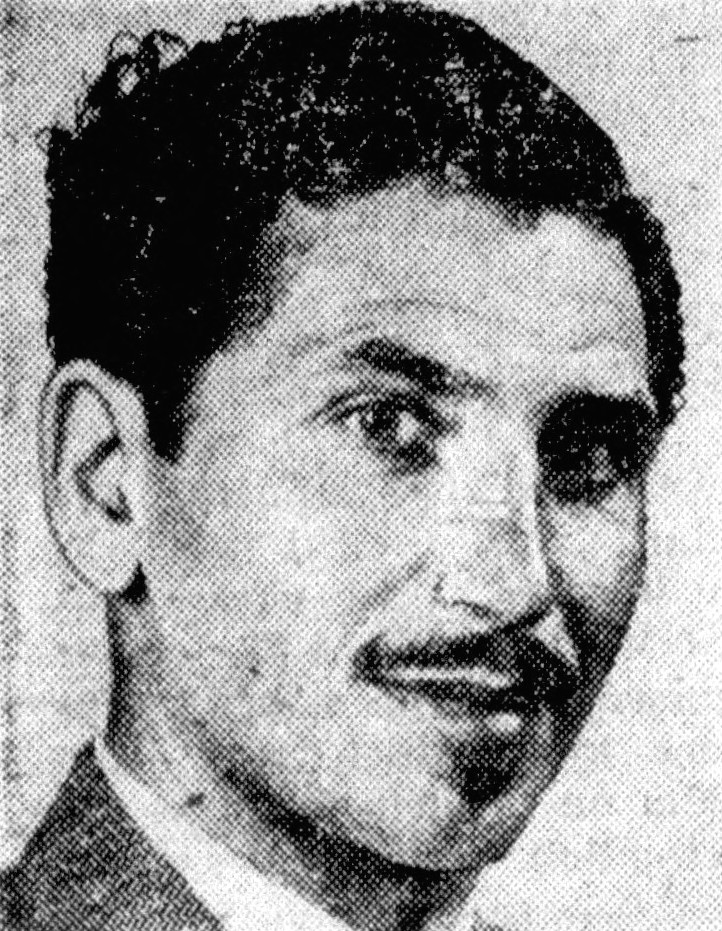
- Yogi, circa 1949
- Born: April 4, 1915; Montana, U.S.
- Died: February 15, 1990 (aged 74); Los Angeles, California, U.S.
- Height: 5 ft 9 in (1.75 m)

Count Hillary Yogi, real name Harry M. Frankenberg (April 4, 1915 – February 15, 1990), was an American author and golf performer. He began his career in Chicago and later moved to Los Angeles, where he adopted the stage name Count Yogi. He was a favorite golf teacher and playing partner of Mickey Rooney, Dean Martin, Hoagy Carmichael and other Hollywood stars. Count Yogi is often referred to as the "greatest golfer you've never heard of". He was a prolific scorer, teacher and traveling promoter of golf in the 20th century, performing the "Count Yogi" golf show at thousands of venues across North America. He also wrote golf books such as 5 Simple Steps to Perfect Golf (1979).

== Early life and golf career ==
Harry Frankenberg was born in Montana. His family moved to Chicago when he was a young boy. He lived near a golf course, mingled with the local golfers and began caddying at an early age. Quickly becoming a skillful golfer and one of Chicago's youngest golf professionals, he won many Chicago-area golf tournaments in the 1930s and '40s. By the mid-1940s, Frankenberg was one of Chicago's most successful golf businessmen, owning several indoor golf ranges and teaching thousands of golfers. The Frankenberg Golf Foundation owned and operated several indoor driving ranges, and his team of golf instructors taught thousands of Chicago area golfers indoors throughout the winter months.

== Later career ==
In the late 1940s, Frankenberg moved with his wife and young family to California, where his wife planned to pursue acting. He quickly joined the local celebrity golf scene. By the 1950s, he was a golf teacher and playing partner of Mickey Rooney, Hoagy Carmicheal and other celebrities. Carmicheal suggested that Frankenberg was like a golf yogi, causing Frankenberg to choose his nickname. Count Yogi's golf skills were legendary. He eventually started a golf show that he would perform in conjunction with golf tournaments and other events across the country. By the 1970s, he had performed over 7,000 shows.

== Death ==
Count Yogi continued to promote golf in and around Los Angeles until his death on February 15, 1990.

== Publications ==
- Yogi, Count (1986). Five Simple Steps to Perfect Golf. New York: Simon & Schuster. ISBN 9780671628796.(former edition by Cornerstone Library, 1979)
- Yogi, Count (2013). Revolutionary Golf Made Easy. Kindle Edition. ASIN B00C4ZUSGU. (Print publisher unknown. Unpublished since 1950?)
- Yogi, Count (2013). Golf 1-2. Kindle Edition. ASIN B00C4ZHG4C. (Print from the 1960s, publisher unknown)
