= Count Me In =

Count Me In may refer to:

== Organizations ==
- Count Me In (movement), a youth-run charitable organization
- Count Me In (charity), a charitable organization that provides support to woman-owned businesses

== Music ==
=== Albums ===
- Count Me In (Death Before Dishonor album), 2007
- Count Me In (Jann Browne album), 1995
- Count Me In (Rebelution album), 2014

=== Songs ===
- "Count Me In" (Gary Lewis & the Playboys song), 1965 song by Gary Lewis & the Playboys
- "Count Me In" (Deana Carter song), 1997
- "Count Me In" (311 song), 2011
- "Count Me In" (Kris Thomas song), 2013 song by Kris Thomas
- "Count Me In", 2014 song by singer and Disney Channel actress Dove Cameron
- "Count Me In", 2018 song by Lil Yachty from his studio album Lil Boat 2
- "Count Me In", 1985 song by Little River Band from their studio album Playing to Win
