= Counter (collectible card games) =

Playing piece used in collectible card games

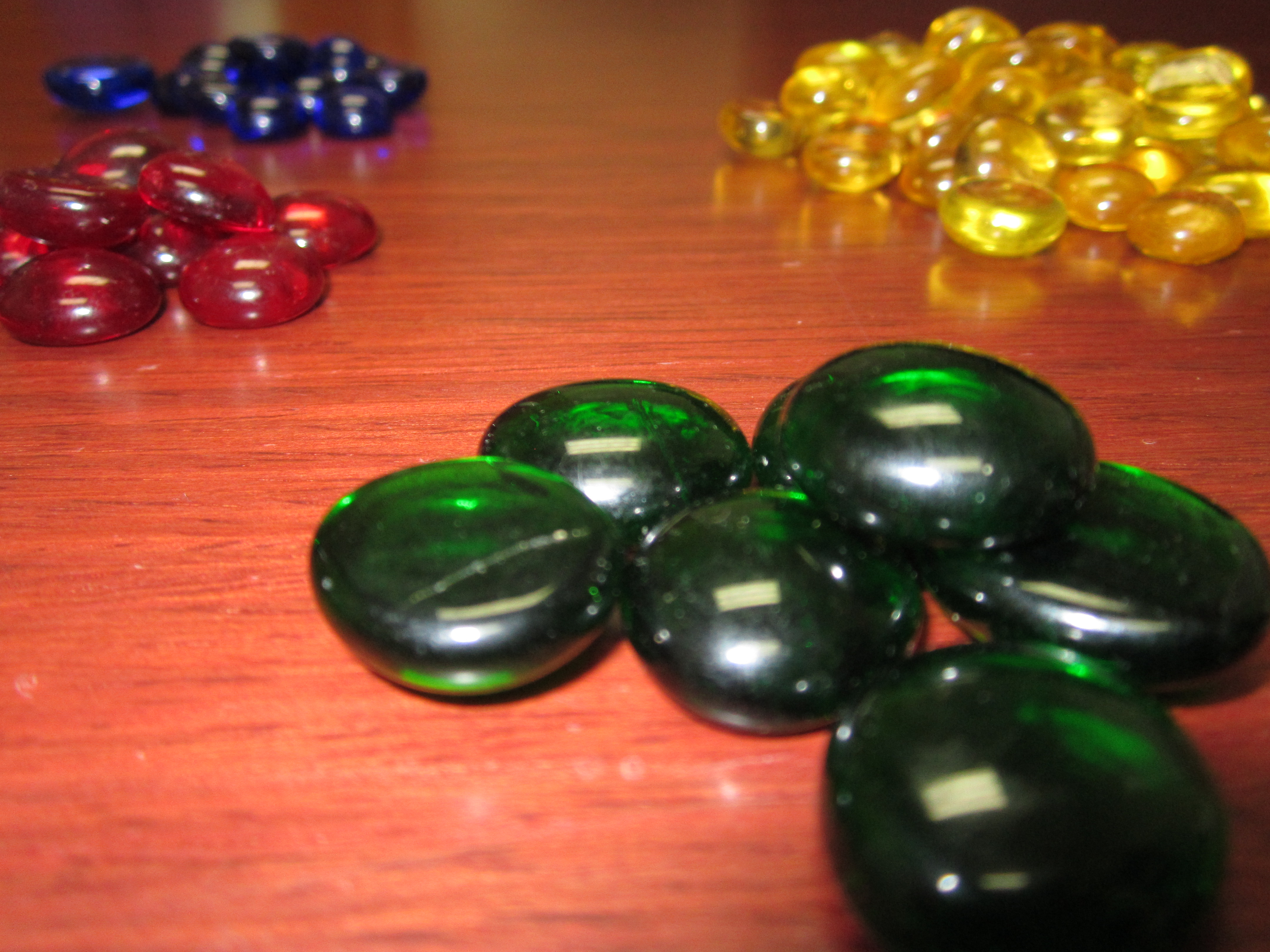
Glass beads are often used as counters

A counter is a gameplay mechanic used in collectible card games (CCG) that physically represents an effect generated by a card. It is represented by any number of small objects, usually glass beads, coins, dice, or bingo chips. They are typically placed on the card generating the counter. This effect may be a count tally for keeping track of things like monitoring a life total, hit points, or a status of a card.

These counters should not be confused with effects that negate or stop a card or effect from being played, in other words a counteractive card.

== Types of counters ==
- Creature counter - also known as token creatures that are generated by cards.
- Time counter - a starting amount of counters is placed on a card. One counter is removed at designated intervals, usually during the player's turn. An effect takes place when the final counter is removed.
- Accumulative counter - when enough counters have been accumulated an effect occurs. The required number of counters is usually removed, with some cards continuing to accumulate counters.
- Life counter - a counter used to represent the life total of a player
- Status counter - a counter used to designate a status of a card, or some other game attribute
