= Hand knitting =

Form of knitting, in which the knitted fabric is produced by hand using needles

Hand knitting is a form of knitting, in which the knitted fabric is produced by hand using needles.

== Types ==
=== Flat knitting ===
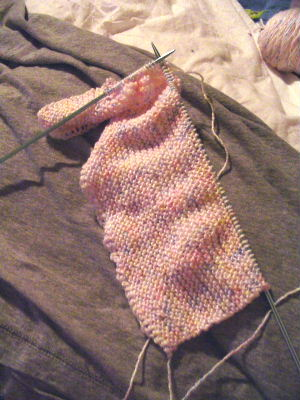
Flat knitting. The loops on the needles are the active stitches, and the yarn coming out of the knitting on the right is the working yarn.

Flat knitting involves working back and forth in rows to create a two-dimensional fabric. At the end of each row, the piece is turned and worked across. This technique produces individual fabric panels, which can be used for flat items such as scarves, shawls, dishcloths, blankets, and afghans. A single panel can be joined at the ends to form continuous or circular items like an infinity scarf, a snood scarf, or a knit hat. Multiple panels can be sewn together to construct garments such as sweaters (pullovers or jumpers), combining separate pieces for the back, front, and sleeves.

Flat knitting can be done with straight needles or circular needles.

=== Circular knitting ===
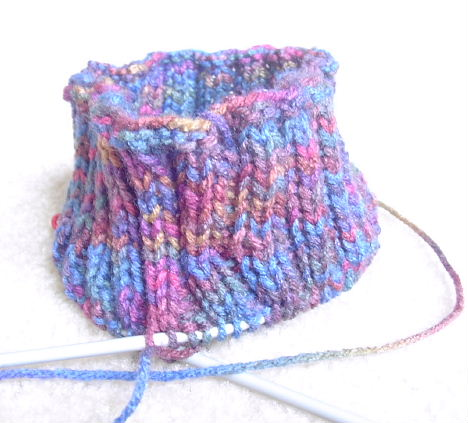
Circular knitting on a circular needle

Circular knitting (also referred to as "knitting or working in the round") creates a seamless tube of knitted fabric. Knitting is worked in continuous rounds (the equivalent of rows in flat knitting). Circular knitting is used to create pieces that are circular or tube-shaped, such as hats, socks, mittens, sleeves, and entire sweaters.

Originally, circular knitting was done using a set of four or five double-pointed knitting needles. In 1918, Frank L. Sessions was issued a patten for circular knitting needles. This invention made knitting tubular forms easier and more ergonomic. A circular needle resembles two short knitting needles connected by a cable of varying length between them.

=== Two-at-a-time ===
Two-at-a-time is a method of knitting two items, such as socks, at the same time. Traditionally, this was done on two sets of double-pointed needles. Other approaches include knitting on two circular needles, and the "magic loop" technique, which involves using a circular needle with a long flexible cable.

=== Fabric Finishing ===
==== Felting ====
Felting is the hand-knitters' term for fulling, a technique for joining knitted or woven animal-fibres. The finished product is put in hot water and agitated until it starts to shrink. The result typically has a felt-like appearance but has reduced dimensions. Bags, mittens, vests, socks, slippers, and hats are just a few items that can be felted.

==== Needle felting ====
Needle felting is a technique used to add decoration to a knitted or felted piece, where raw roving is applied using a very sharp barbed felting needle by repeatedly piercing the roving and background together. Once washed in hot water, the appliqued decoration is fused with the background. Felted knitting can be cut with scissors without concern about fraying.

== Process ==
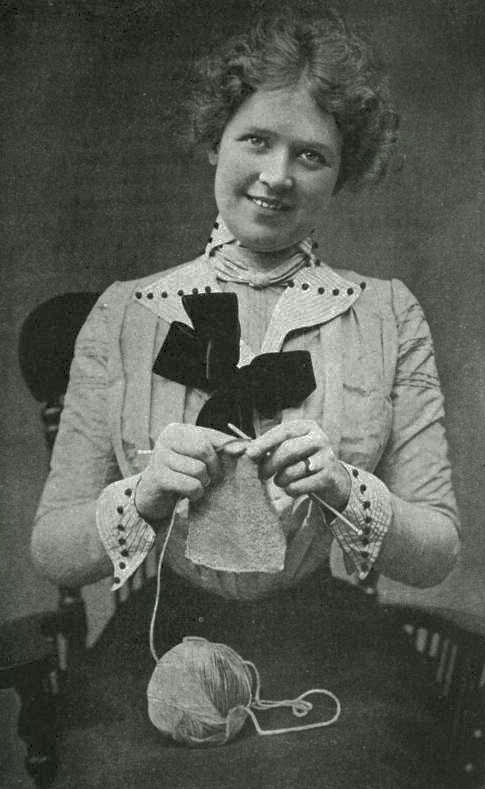
A woman in the process of knitting

There are many hundreds of different knitting stitches used by knitters. A piece of knitting begins with the process of casting on, which involves the initial creation of the stitches on the needle. Different methods of casting on are used for different effects: one may be stretchy enough for lace, while another provides a decorative edging. Provisional cast-ons are used when the knitting will continue in both directions from the cast-on. There are various methods employed to cast on, such as the "thumb method" (also known as "slingshot" or "long-tail" cast-ons), where the stitches are created by a series of loops that will, when knitted, give a very loose edge ideal for "picking up stitches" and knitting a border; the "double needle method" (also known as "knit-on" or "cable cast-on"), whereby each loop placed on the needle is then "knitted on," which produces a firmer edge ideal on its own as a border; and many more. The number of active stitches remains the same as when cast on unless stitches are added (an increase) or removed (a decrease).

Most Western-style knitters follow either the English style (in which the yarn is held in the right hand) or the Continental style (in which the yarn is held in the left hand). These styles show various regional differences. English knitting can be split up into, among others, throwing, flicking, and lever knitting. Continental knitting also shows a similar range of styles. Stitches can be produced by wrapping the needle around the yarn or by simply picking it through (often called "Continental picking").

There are also different ways to insert the needle into the stitch. Knitting through the front of a stitch is called Western knitting. Going through the back of a stitch is called Eastern knitting. A third method, called combination knitting, goes through the front of a knit stitch and the back of a purl stitch. In Scandinavia, but especially in Norway, the purl stitch is produced with yarn held in back and held as close to the needles as possible. This shifts the tensioning of the yarn away from the fingers and on to the needle.

Once the knitted piece is finished, the remaining live stitches are "cast off". Casting (or "binding") off loops the stitches across each other so they can be removed from the needle without unravelling the item. Although the mechanics are different from casting on, there is a similar variety of methods.

In knitting certain articles of clothing, especially larger ones like sweaters, the final knitted garment will be made of several knitted pieces, with individual sections of the garment knit separately and then sewn together. Seamless knitting, where a whole garment is knit as a single piece, is also possible. Elizabeth Zimmermann is probably the best-known proponent of seamless or circular knitting techniques. Smaller items, such as socks and hats, are usually knit in one piece on double-pointed needles or small diameter circular needles. (See Circular knitting.)

== Stitches ==
Describing knitting as a fabric constructed using loops of yarn hides the complexity and number of different stitches that can be created. A piece of knitting begins with the process of casting on (also known as "binding on"), which involves the initial creation of the stitches on the needle. Different methods of casting on are used for different effects: one may be stretchy enough for lace, while another provides a decorative edging — Provisional cast-ons are used when the knitting will continue in both directions from the cast-on. There are various method employed to "cast on," such as the "thumb method" (also known as "slingshot" or "long-tail" cast-ons), where the stitches are created by a series of loops that will, when knitted, give a very loose edge ideal for "picking up stitches" and knitting a border; the "double needle method" (also known as "knit-on" or "cable cast-on"), whereby each loop placed on the needle is then "knitted on," which produces a firmer edge ideal on its own as a border; and many more. The number of active stitches remains the same as when cast on unless stitches are added (an increase) or removed (a decrease).

== Social aspects ==
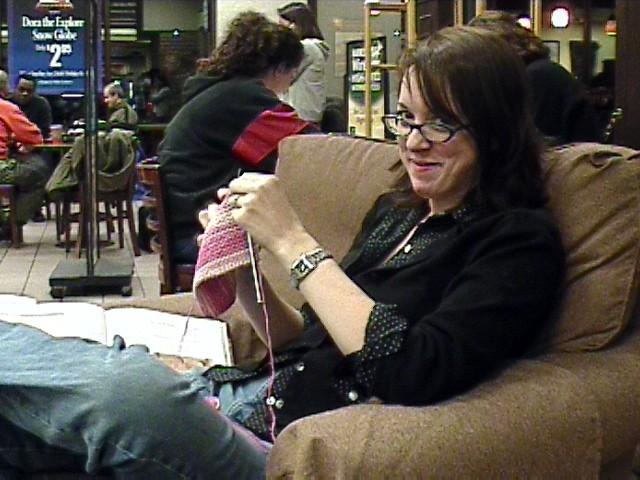
This woman is knitting at a coffee shop; although it can be done by one person alone, knitting can be a social activity. There are many knitting guilds and other knitting groups or knitting clubs.

One of the earliest known examples of knitting was finely decorated cotton socks found in Egypt in the end of the first millennium AD. The first knitting trade guild was started in Paris in 1527. With the invention of the knitting machine, however, knitting "by hand" became a useful but non-essential craft. Similar to quilting, spinning, and needlepoint, knitting became a social activity.

Hand knitting has gone in and out of fashion many times in the last two centuries, and at the turn of the 21st century underwent a revival. According to the industry group Craft Yarn Council of America, the number of women knitters in the United States age 25–35 increased 150% in the two years between 2002 and 2004. While in the 1940s and 1950s knitting was pursued largely to make do and mend, knitting is appreciated more recently for its therapeutic benefits, ability to bring people together, and as an art.

Additionally, many contemporary knitters have an interest in blogging about their knitting, knitting patterns, and techniques, or joining a virtual community focused on knitting, such as the extremely popular Ravelry. There are also a number of popular knitting podcasts, and various other knitting websites. One website, LoveCrafts, allows users to upload pictures of projects and add tags. Other users can comment, encouraging conversation and continuous learning. Contemporary knitting groups may be referred to in the U.S. as a "Stitch 'N Bitch" where a group of knitters get together to work on projects, discuss [knitting patterns], troubleshoot their work and just socialize. In the UK, the term has been "knitting circle" since the early 20th century.

There are now numerous groups that are not only growing individually, but also forming international communities. Communities also exist online, with blogs being very popular, alongside online groups and social networking through mediums such as Yahoo! Groups, where people can share tips and techniques, run competitions, and share their knitting patterns. More people are finding knitting a recreation and enjoying the hobby with their family. Knitting parties also are becoming popular in small and large communities around the U.S. and Canada.

=== Graffiti ===
In the last decade, a practice called knitting graffiti, guerilla knitting, or yarn bombing— the use of knitted or crocheted cloth to modify and beautify one's (usually outdoor) surroundings—emerged in the U.S. and spread worldwide. Magda Sayeg is credited with starting the movement in the US and Knit the city are a prominent group of graffiti knitters in the United Kingdom. Yarn bombers sometimes target existing pieces of graffiti for beautification. For instance, Dave Cole is a contemporary sculpture artist who practiced knitting as graffiti for a large-scale public art installation in Melbourne, Australia for the Big West Arts Festival in 2009. The work was vandalized the night of its completion. A new movie, shot by a Tasmanian filmmaker on a set made almost entirely out of yarn, was partially inspired by "knitted graffiti".

=== Charity ===
Knitting garments for free distribution to others is a common theme in modern history.

Knitters made socks, sweaters, scarves, mittens, gloves, and hats for soldiers in Crimea, the American Civil War, and the Boer Wars; this practice continued in World War I, World War II and the Korean War, and continues for soldiers in Iraq and Afghanistan. In these historical projects, yarn companies often provided knitting patterns approved by the various branches of the armed services; they were distributed by local chapters of the American Red Cross or other organizations. Modern projects usually entail the knitting of hats or helmet liners; the liners provided for soldiers must be of 100% worsted weight wool and be crafted using specific colors.

The Australian charity Wrap with Love provides blankets knitted by volunteers to people most in need around the world who have been affected by war. Clothing and afghans are frequently made for children, the elderly, and the economically disadvantaged in various countries. Pine Ridge Indian Reservation accepts donations for the Lakota people in the United States. Prayer shawls, or shawls in which the crafter meditates or says prayers of their faith while knitting with the intent on comforting the recipient, are donated to those experiencing loss or stress. Many knitters today knit and donate "chemo caps," soft caps for cancer patients who lose their hair during chemotherapy. Yarn companies offer free knitting patterns for these caps.

The US-based charity Sheep Dreamzzz trains women in Nicaragua to knit baby blankets. They receive all of the profits. Nicaragua is the poorest country in Central America. The blankets are all hand-knitted and the women work inside a home. People purchase these blankets to give a gift and also help those in need. PNC Financial has given Sheep Dreamzzz blankets for their Operation Shower participation (baby blankets for military moms) in association with the non-profit work done by professional golfer Jim Furyk and his wife Tabitha.

Originally started after the 2004 Indonesian tsunami, Knitters Without Borders is a charity challenge issued by knitting personality Stephanie Pearl-McPhee that encourages knitters to donate to Médecins Sans Frontières (Doctors Without Borders). Instead of knitting for charity, knitters are encouraged to donate a week's worth of disposable income, including money that otherwise might have been spent on yarn. Knitted items are occasional offered as prizes to donors. As of September 2011, Knitters Without Borders donors have contributed CAD$1,062,217.

Security blankets can also be made through the Project Linus organization which helps needy children.

There are organizations that help reach other countries in need such as afghans for Afghans. This outreach is described as, "afghans for Afghans is a humanitarian and educational people-to-people project that sends hand-knit and crocheted blankets and sweaters, vests, hats, mittens, and socks to the beleaguered people of Afghanistan."

Penguin sweaters were knitted by volunteers for the rehabilitation of penguins contaminated by exposure to oil slicks. The project is now complete.

Chicken sweaters were also knitted to aid battery hens that had lost their feathers. The organization is not currently accepting donations, but maintains a list of volunteers.

=== Sweater curse ===
Knitting especially large or fine garments, such as sweaters, can require months of work and, as gifts, may have a strong emotional aspect. The so-called sweater curse expresses the experience that a significant other will break up with the knitter immediately after receiving a costly hand-knit gift such as a sweater. A significant minority of knitters claim to have experienced the sweater curse. A poll in 2005 indicated that 15% of active knitters say they have experienced the sweater curse firsthand, and 41% consider it a possibility that should be taken seriously. Although sometimes labeled a "superstition", the sweater curse is not treated in knitting literature as anything paranormal.

== Psychological and meditative aspects ==
The oral histories of many knitters have been collected, and suggest that hand-knitting is often associated with compassion. "I knit love into every stitch" is a common refrain.

The repetitive aspect of hand-knitting is generally relaxing and can be well-suited for meditational or spiritual practice.

=== Health benefits ===
Studies have shown that knitting, along with other forms of needlework, provides several significant health benefits. These studies have found the rhythmic and repetitive action of knitting can "help prevent and manage stress, pain and depression, which in turn strengthens the body's immune system", as well as create a relaxation response in the body which can decrease blood pressure, heart rate, help prevent illness, and have a calming effect. Pain specialists have also found that the brain chemistry is changed when one knits, resulting in an increase in "feel good" hormones (i.e. serotonin and dopamine), and a decrease in stress hormones.

Knitting, along with other leisure activities has been linked to reducing the risk of developing Alzheimer's disease and dementia. Much like physical activity strengthens the body, mental exercise makes the human brain more resilient.

A repository of research into the effect on health of knitting can be found at Stitchlinks, an organization founded in Bath, England.

== Mega knitting ==
Increasingly popular Mega knitting is hand knitting using knitting needles greater than or equal to half an inch in diameter.

Mega knitting uses the same stitches and techniques as conventional knitting, except that hooks may be carved into the ends of the needles. The hooked needles greatly enhance control of the work, catching the stitches and preventing them from slipping off.

Mega knitting produces a chunky, bulky fabric or an open lacy weave, depending on the weight and type of yarn used.

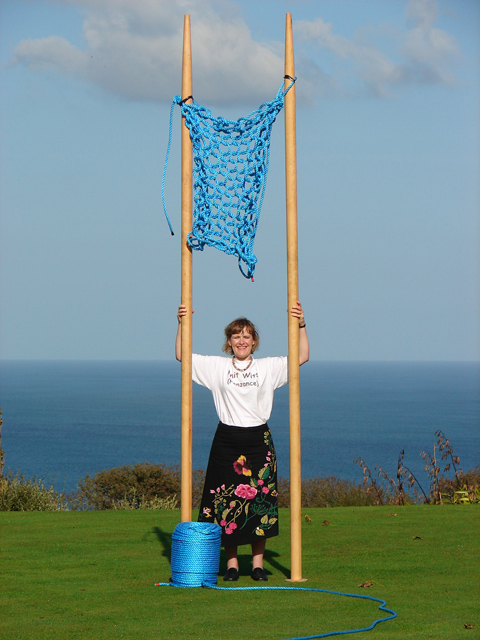
Julia Hopson with world-record 3.5 meter (11'6") long knitting needles

The current holder of the Guinness World Record for Knitting with the Largest Knitting Needles is Julia Hopson of Penzance in Cornwall. Julia knitted a square of ten stitches and ten rows in stockinette stitch using knitting needles that were 6.5 centimeters (2 1/2 inches) in diameter and 3.5 meters (11 feet 6 inches) long.

== In literature ==
Knitting is sometimes featured in literature. Knitting and its techniques may be used as a metaphor; its meditative and spiritual aspects may be emphasized; it may signal various types of domesticity; or it may be used for dramatic irony, as when an apparently harmless knitter proves deadly and implacable. Examples from 19th century novels include Madame Thérèse Defarge in Charles Dickens' A Tale of Two Cities, Anna Makarovna in Leo Tolstoy's War and Peace, various characters in Jane Austen's novels and Miss Ophelia in Harriet Beecher Stowe's Uncle Tom's Cabin. Several characters in Virginia Wolff's novels are knitters. In the first decade of the 21st century, knitting has been a key element in several novels and even murder mysteries.

== Knitting materials ==
=== Yarn ===
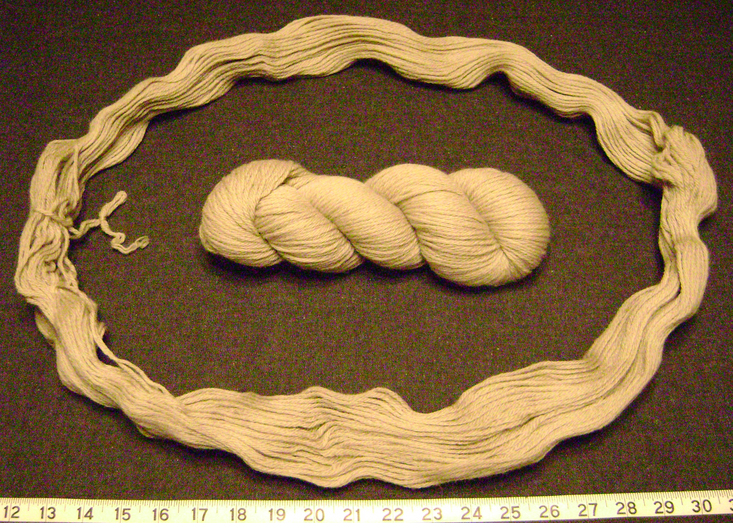
A skein of wool yarn (center) is uncoiled into its basic loop. A tie is visible at the left; after untying, the hank may be wound into a ball or balls suitable for knitting. Knitting from a normal hank directly is likely to tangle the yarn, producing snarls.

Yarn for hand-knitting is usually sold as balls or skeins (hanks), although it may also be wound on spools or cones. Skeins and balls are generally sold with a yarn-band, a label that describes the yarn's weight, length, dye lot, fiber content, washing instructions, suggested needle size, likely gauge, etc. It is common practice to save the yarn band for future reference, especially if additional skeins must be purchased. Knitters generally ensure that the yarn for a project comes from a single dye lot. The dye lot specifies a group of skeins that were dyed together and thus have precisely the same color; skeins from different dye-lots, even if very similar in color, are usually slightly different and may produce a visible stripe when knitted into the same project. If a knitter buys insufficient yarn of a single dye lot to complete a project, additional skeins of the same dye lot can sometimes be obtained from other yarn stores or online.

The thickness of the yarn is a significant factor in determining the gauge, i.e., how many stitches and rows are required to cover a given area for a given stitch pattern. Thicker yarns generally require thicker knitting needles, whereas thinner yarns may be knit with thick or thin needles. Hence, thicker yarns generally require fewer stitches, and therefore less time, to knit up a given garment. Patterns and motifs are coarser with thicker yarns; thicker yarns produce bold visual effects, whereas thinner yarns are best for refined patterns. Yarns are grouped by thickness into six categories: superfine, fine, light, medium, bulky, and superbulky; quantitatively, thickness is measured by the number of wraps per inch (WPI). The related weight per unit length is usually measured in tex or dernier.

In addition to choosing the correct thickness for the gauge, the knitter must also pick the type of yarn fiber. There are currently about fifteen types of yarn fiber, falling into two categories, natural and synthetic. Natural fibers are those that are obtained from a plant or an animal and have different attributes depending on the animal/plant they are harvested from which must be taken into account when considering the uses of a finished knitting object. Example: Wool is well suited to items which will be used to hold in heat, even when damp, such as winter hats and mittens. Linen, however, would be well suited to a light summer sweater when breathability is a factor. Synthetic fibers are made by forcing a thick solution of polymerized chemicals through spinneret nozzles and hardening the resulting filament in a chemical bath. Natural fibers are generally softer and more comfortable whereas synthetics are durable and easier to dye. Some fibers can be harder to knit with than others for a variety of reasons. Cotton, for example, doesn't stretch as much as wool, and as such requires the knitter to work harder to maintain gauge.

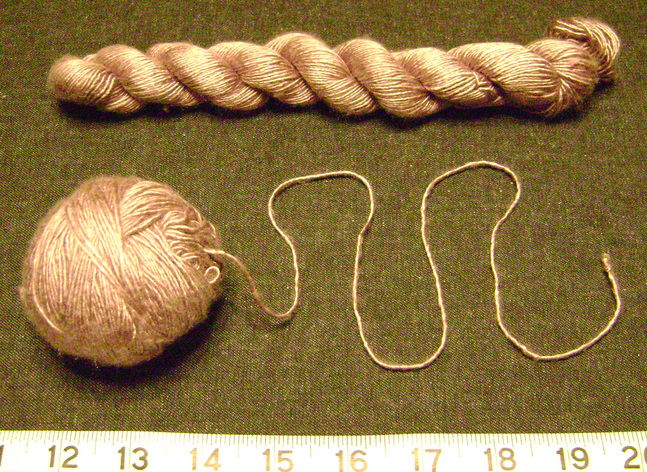
Transformation of a hank of lavender silk yarn (top) into a ball in which the knitting yarn emerges from the center (bottom). The latter is better for knitting since the yarn is much less likely to tangle.

Before knitting, the knitter will typically transform a hank into a ball where the yarn emerges from the center of the ball; this making the knitting easier by preventing the yarn from becoming easily tangled. This transformation may be done by hand, or with a device known as a ballwinder. When knitting, some knitters enclose their balls in jars to keep them clean and untangled with other yarns; the free yarn passes through a small hole in the jar-lid.

A yarn's usefulness for a knitting project is judged by several factors, such as its loft (its ability to trap air), its resilience (elasticity under tension), its washability and colorfastness, its hand (its feel, particularly softness vs. scratchiness), its durability against abrasion, its resistance to pilling, its hairiness (fuzziness), its tendency to twist or untwist, its overall weight and drape, its blocking and felting qualities, its comfort (breathability, moisture absorption, wicking properties) and of course its look, which includes its color, sheen, smoothness and ornamental features. Other factors include allergenicity; speed of drying; resistance to chemicals, moths, and mildew; melting point and flammability; retention of static electricity; and the propensity to become stained and to accept dyes. Different factors may be more significant than others for different knitting projects, so there is no one "best" yarn. The resilience and propensity to (un)twist are general properties that affect the ease of hand-knitting. More resilient yarns are more forgiving of irregularities in tension; highly twisted yarns are sometimes difficult to knit, whereas untwisting yarns can lead to split stitches, in which not all the yarn is knitted into a stitch. A key factor in knitting is stitch definition, corresponding to how well complicated stitch patterns can be seen when made from a given yarn. Smooth, highly spun yarns are best for showing off stitch patterns; at the other extreme, very fuzzy yarns or eyelash yarns have poor stitch definition, and any complicated stitch pattern would be invisible.

Sometimes unconventional materials are like paper, rope, flexible metal wire, and plastic tubing are used in place of yarn.

== Tools ==
The process of knitting has three basic tasks: (1) the active (unsecured) stitches must be held so they don't drop; (2) these stitches must be released sometime after they are secured; and (3) new bights of yarn must be passed through the fabric, usually through active stitches, thus securing them. In very simple cases, knitting can be done without tools, using only the fingers to do these tasks; however, hand-knitting is usually carried out using tools such as knitting needles or rigid frames. Depending on their size and shape, the rigid frames are called knitting boards, knitting rings (also called knitting looms) or knitting spools (also known as knitting knobbies, knitting nancies, or corkers). Other tools are used to prepare yarn for knitting, to measure and design knitted garments, or to make knitting easier or more comfortable.

=== Needles ===
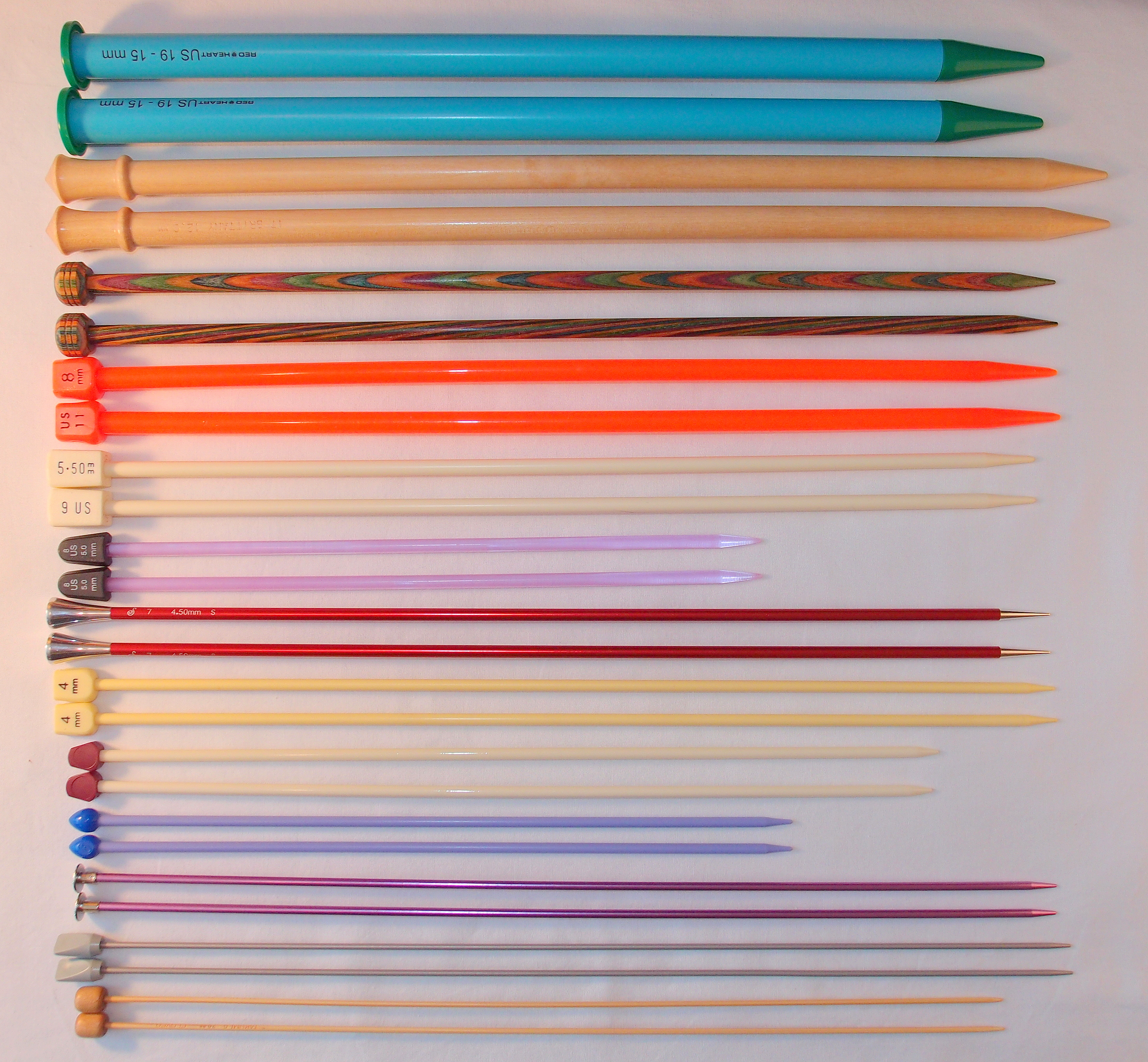
Knitting needles in a variety of sizes and materials. Different materials have varying amounts of friction, and are suitable for different yarn types.

There are four basic types of knitting needles (also called "knitting pins"). The first and most common type consists of two slender, straight sticks tapered to a point at one end, and with a knob at the other end to prevent stitches from slipping off. Such needles are usually 10-16 inches long but, due to the compressibility of knitted fabrics, may be used to knit pieces significantly wider. The most important property of needles is their diameter, which ranges from below 2 mm to 25 mm (roughly 1 inch). The diameter affects the size of stitches, which affects the gauge of the knitting and the elasticity of the fabric. Thus, a simple way to change gauge is to use different needles, which is the basis of uneven knitting. Although knitting needle diameter is often measured in millimeters, there are several different size systems, particularly those specific to the United States, the United Kingdom and Japan; a conversion table is given in the knitting needle article. Such knitting needles may be made out of any materials, but the most common materials are metals, wood, bamboo, and plastic. Different materials have different frictions and grip the yarn differently; slick needles such as metallic needles are useful for swift knitting, whereas rougher needles such as bamboo are less prone to dropping stitches. The knitting of new stitches occurs only at the tapered ends, and needles with lighted tips have been sold to allow knitters to knit in the dark.

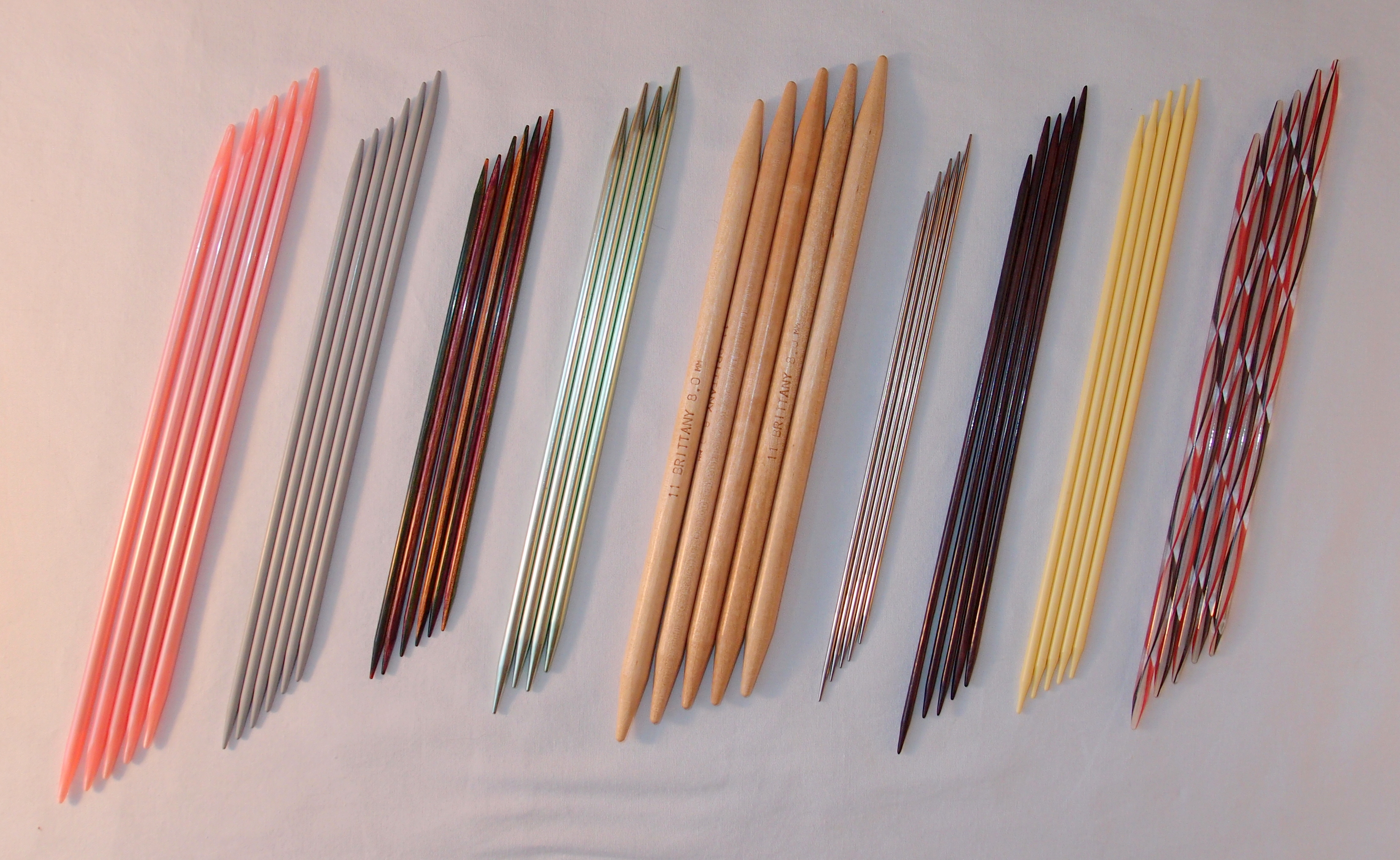
Double-pointed knitting needles in various materials and sizes. They come in sets of four, five or six.

The second type of knitting needles are straight, double-pointed knitting needles (also called "dpns"). Double-pointed needles are tapered at both ends, which allows them to be knit from either end. Dpns are typically used for circular knitting, especially smaller tube-shaped pieces such as sleeves, collars, and socks; usually one needle is active while the others hold the remaining active stitches. Dpns are somewhat shorter (typically 7 inches) and are usually sold in sets of four or five.

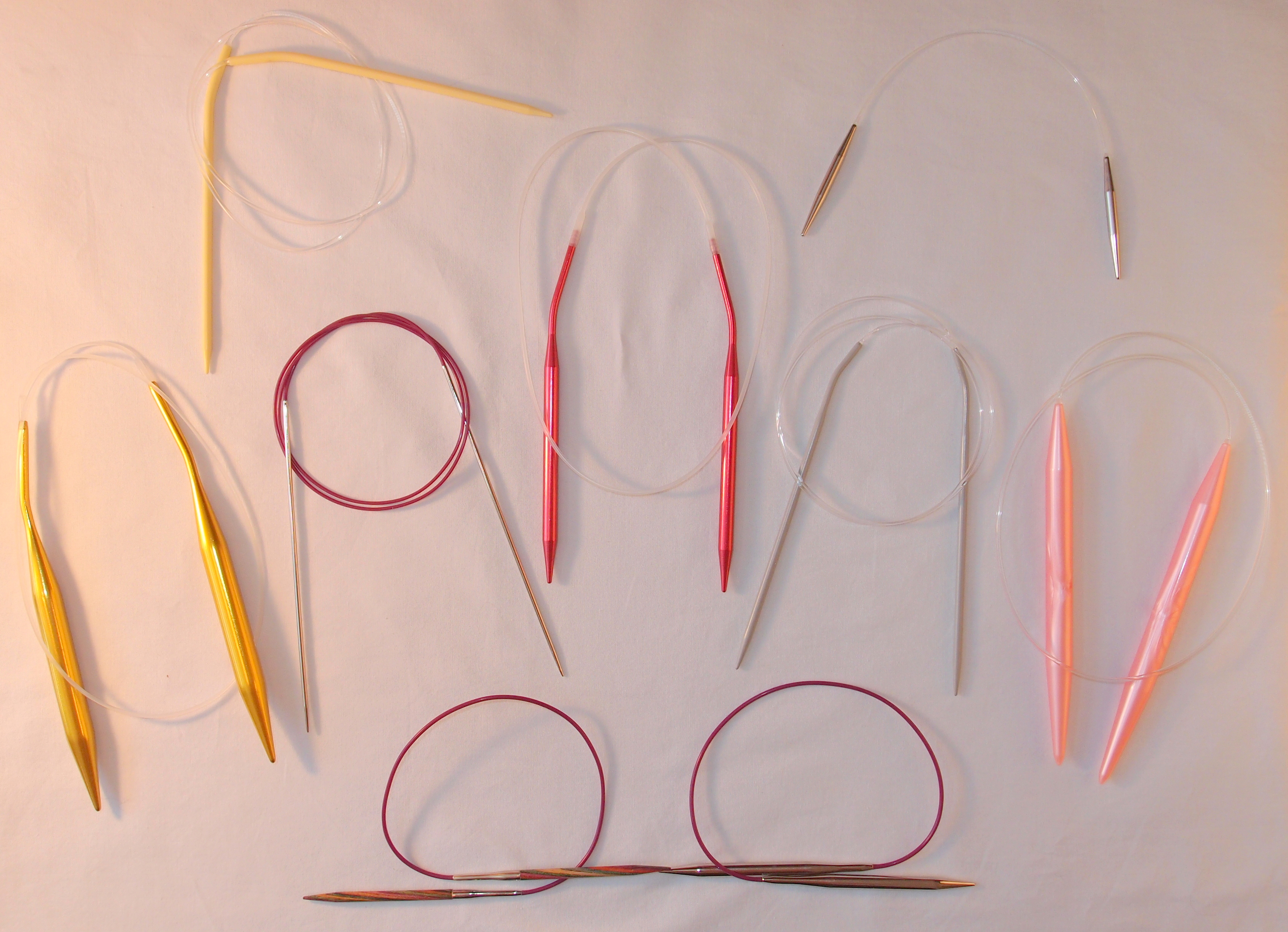
Circular knitting needles in different lengths, materials and sizes, including plastic, aluminum, steel and nickel-plated brass.

Cable needles are a special case of dpns, although they usually are not straight, but dimpled in the middle. Cable needles are typically very short (a few inches), and are used to hold stitches temporarily while others are being knitted. Cable patterns are made by permuting the order of stitches; although one or two stitches may be held by hand or knit out of order, cables of three or more generally require a cable needle.

The third needle type consists of circular needles, which are long, flexible double-pointed needles. The two tapered ends (typically 5 inches (130 mm) long) are rigid and straight, allowing for easy knitting; however, the two ends are connected by a flexible strand (usually nylon) that allows the two ends to be brought together. Circular needles are typically 24-60 inches long, and are usually used singly or in pairs; again, the width of the knitted piece may be significantly longer than the length of the circular needle. Special kits are available that allow circular needles of various lengths and diameters to be made as needed; rigid ends of various diameters may be screwed into strands of various lengths. The ability to work from either end of one needle is convenient in several types of knitting, such as slip-stitch versions of double knitting. Circular needles may be used for flat or circular knitting.

The fourth type of needle is a hybrid needle. It is a straight needle with a point on one end and a flexible strand on the other end with a stopper, such as a large lightweight bead, at the end. This type of needle allows a larger project to be worked at one time than a straight needle, while folding up quickly and more compactly for travel.

==== Mega needles ====
The largest aluminum circular knitting needles on record are size US 150 and are nearly 7 feet tall. They are owned by Paradise Fibers and are currently on display in the Paradise Fibers retail showroom.

=== Ancillary tools ===
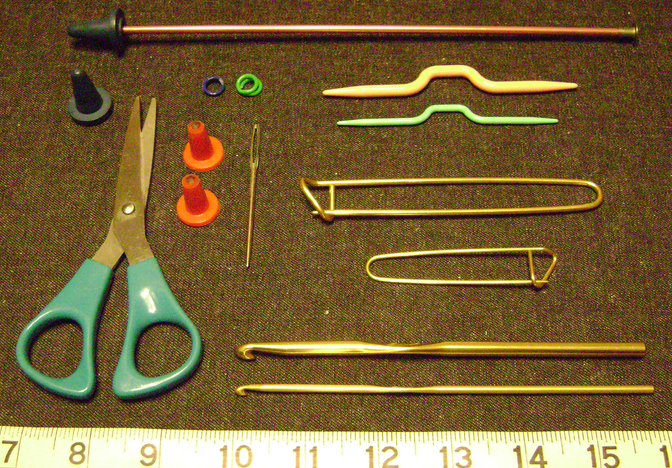
Some ancillary tools used by hand-knitters. Starting from the bottom right are two crochet hooks, two stitch holders (like big blunt safety pins), and two cable needles in pink and green. On the left are a pair of scissors, a yarn needle, green and blue stitch markers, and two orange point protectors. At the top left are two blue point protectors, one on a red needle.

Various tools have been developed to make hand-knitting easier. Tools for measuring needle diameter and yarn properties have been discussed above, as well as the yarn swift, ballwinder and "yarntainers". Crochet hooks and a darning needle are often useful in binding off or in joining two knitted pieces edge-to-edge. The darning needle is used in duplicate stitch (also known as Swiss darning), while the crochet hook is also essential for repairing dropped stitches and some specialty stitches such as tufting. Other tools such as knitting spools or pom-pom makers are used to prepare specific ornaments. For large or complex knitting patterns, it is sometimes difficult to keep track of which stitch should be knit in a particular way; therefore, several tools have been developed to identify the number of a particular row or stitch, including circular stitch markers, hanging markers, extra yarn and counters. A second potential difficulty is that the knitted piece will slide off the tapered end of the needles when unattended; this is prevented by "point protectors" that cap the tapered ends. Another problem is that too much knitting may lead to hand and wrist troubles; for this, special stress-relieving gloves are available. Finally, there are sundry bags and containers for holding knitting projects, yarns and needles.

== See also ==
- Finger knitting
- List of knitting stitches
- Knitting abbreviations
- Knitted fabric
- Knitting clubs
- Yarn bombing
