= List of knitting stitches =

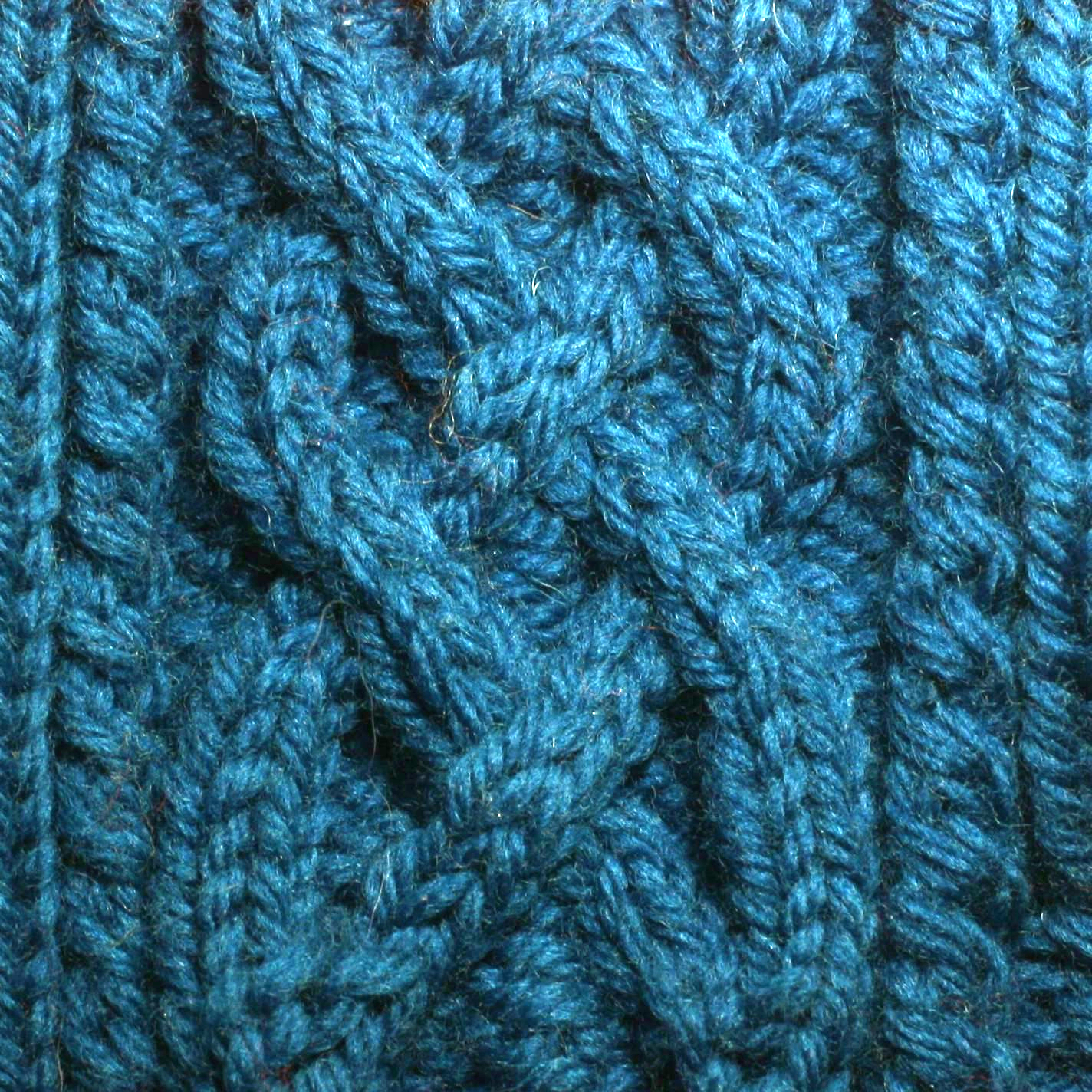
Cable-knit

Demonstration of stitches.

This is a list of knitting stitches. Common knitting abbreviations as used in patterns are shown in parentheses.

== Individual stitches ==
- Knit stitch (k)
- Purl stitch (p)

Variations

- Elongated stitch
- Plaited stitch, also known as a twisted stitch (k tbl, p tbl)
- Slip stitch, may be knit or purl stitch (sl, sl st)

=== Increases ===
- Yarn over (yo)
- Dip stitch which can be either
  - A raised increase, knitting into row below (k-b, k 1 b)
  - A lifted increase, knitting into the yarn between the stitches (inc, m1)
- Knit front and back (kfb)
- Purl front and back (pfb)

=== Decreases ===
All the decreases mentioned are from the perspective of the "right side" of the fabric.

==== Left Leaning Decreases ====
===== Single Decreases =====
- Knit two together left (K2tog-L)
- Knit two together through the back loops (K2tog tbl)
- Purl front and back: pass slipped stitch over (S1, K1, PSSO)
- Purl two together through back loop (P2tog tbl)
- Slip Slip Knit (SSK)
- Slip, Slip Purl, Knit (SSPK)
- Slip, Knit, Pass over (SKP)

===== Double Decreases =====
- Knit three together left (K3tog left-leaning)
- Purl three together through back loop (P3tog tbl)

==== Right Leaning Decreases ====
===== Single Decreases =====
- Knit two together (K2tog)
- Purl two together (P2tog)

===== Double Decreases =====
- Knit three together (K3tog)
- Purl three together (P3tog)

==== Centered Decreases ====
===== Double Decreases =====
- Knit three together centered (K3tog centered)/ Centered Double Decrease (CDD)
- Purl three together centered (P3tog centered)/ Centered Double Decrease Purl (CDDP)

== Stitch patterns ==
=== Knit and purl ===
Basic

- Garter stitch
- Stockinette stitch, also known as stocking stitch
- Reverse stockinette stitch

Variations

- Basketweave stitch
- Seed stitch, also known as moss stitch
- Waffle stitch

=== Rib ===
- English rib (or mistake rib or uneven rib)
- Farrow rib
- Fisherman's Rib stitch

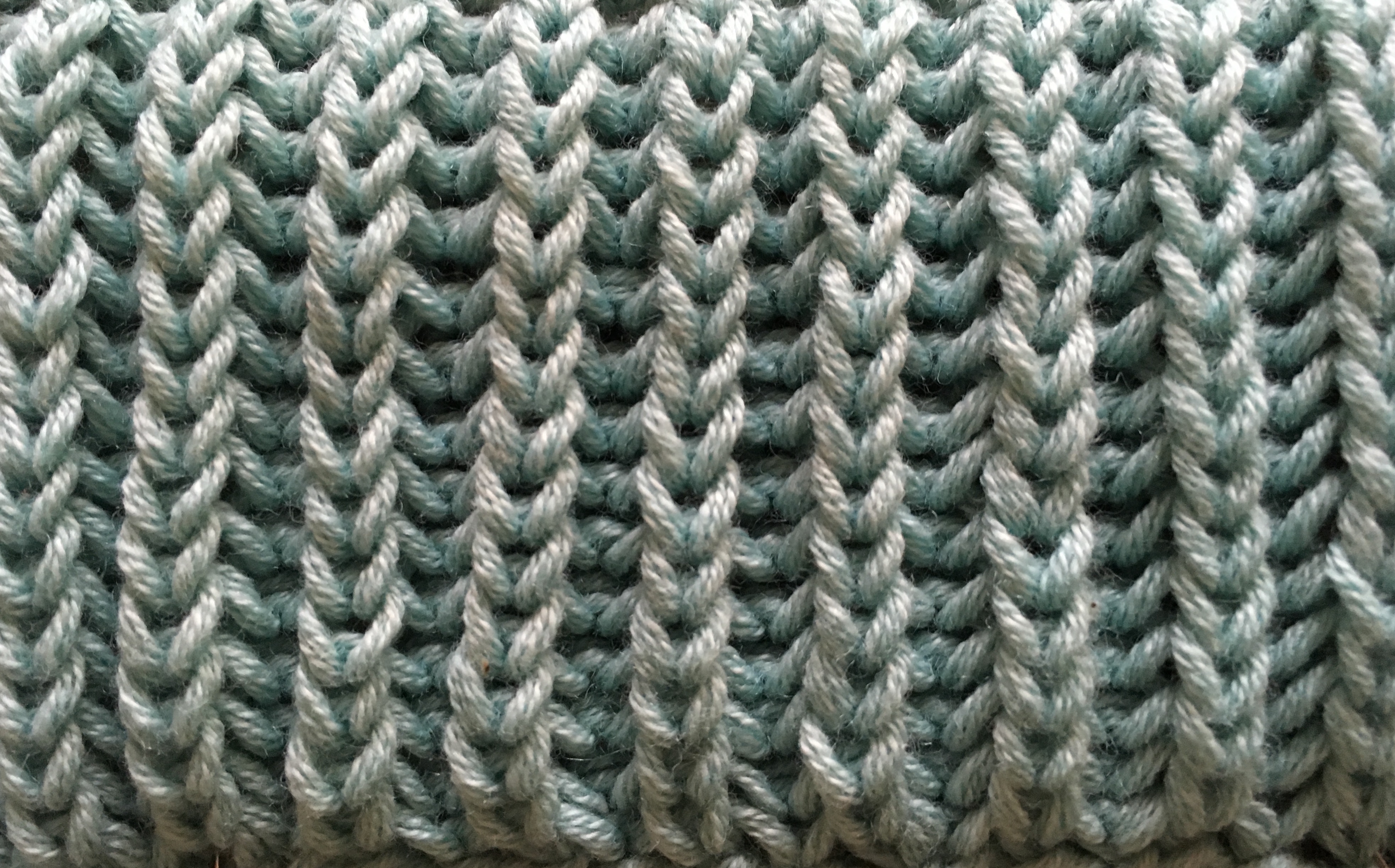
A swatch of fisherman's rib stitch

=== Eyelet and lace ===
- Faggoting
- Raspberry stitch

=== Cable and twist ===
- Cable stitch

=== Slipped stitch patterns ===
- Crossed stitch
- Herringbone stitch
- Linen stitch is a pattern that creates a tightly knit fabric that resembles woven linen. Tailored garments are especially suited for the linen stitch. It is a durable stitch, and is often used to reinforce the heels of hand-knitted socks. It includes knit and purl stitches, as well as slipped stitches.
- Loop stitch

=== Other ===
- Bobble
- Tricot knitting

=== Gallery ===
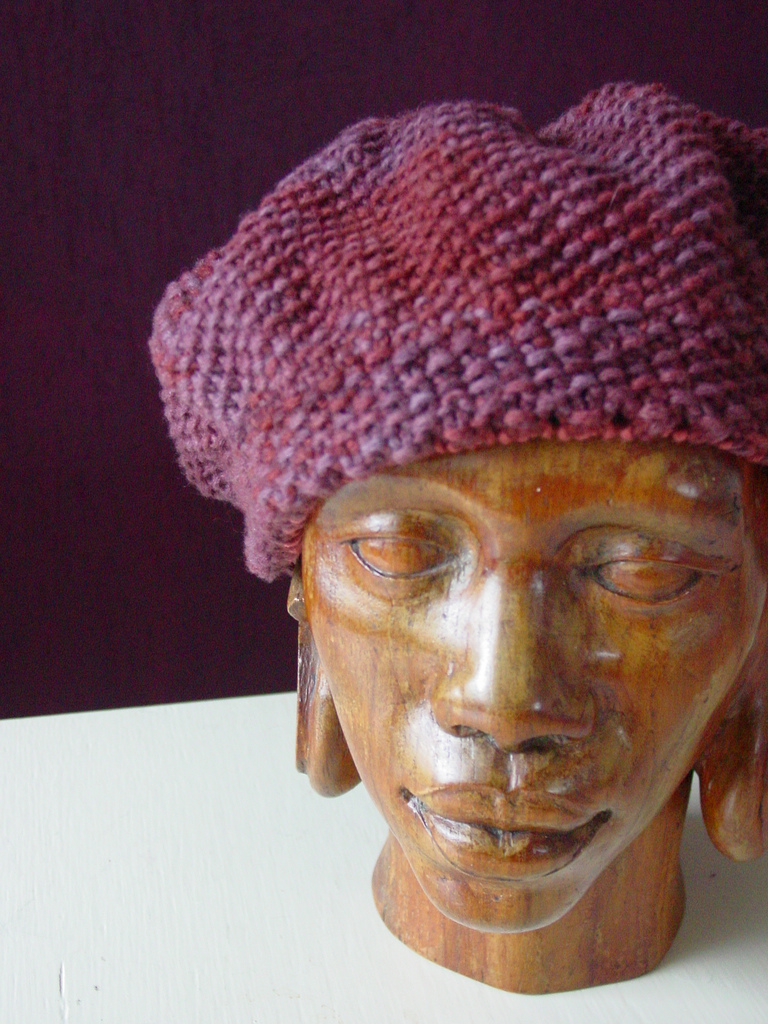
Seed stitch

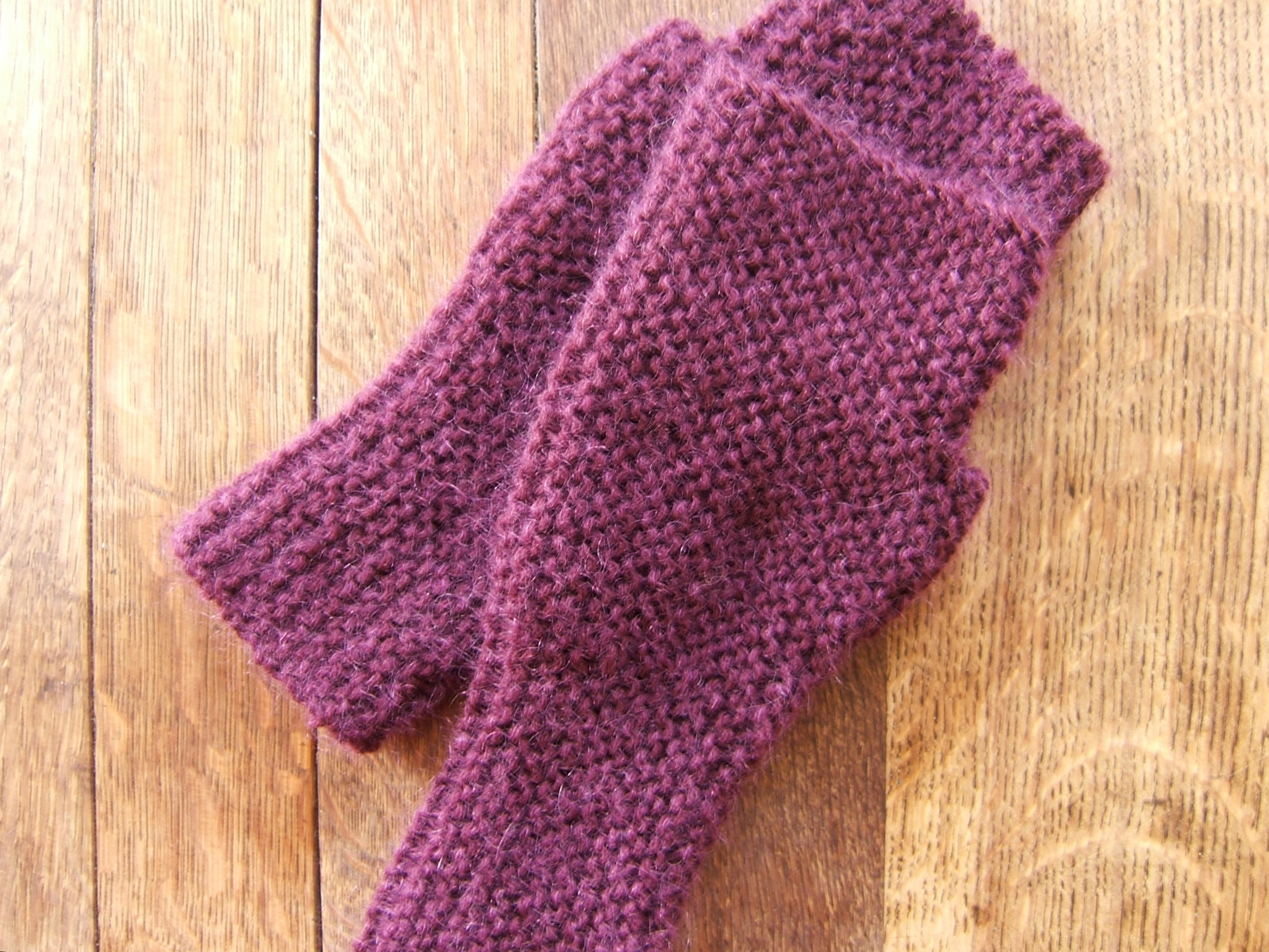
Garter stitch

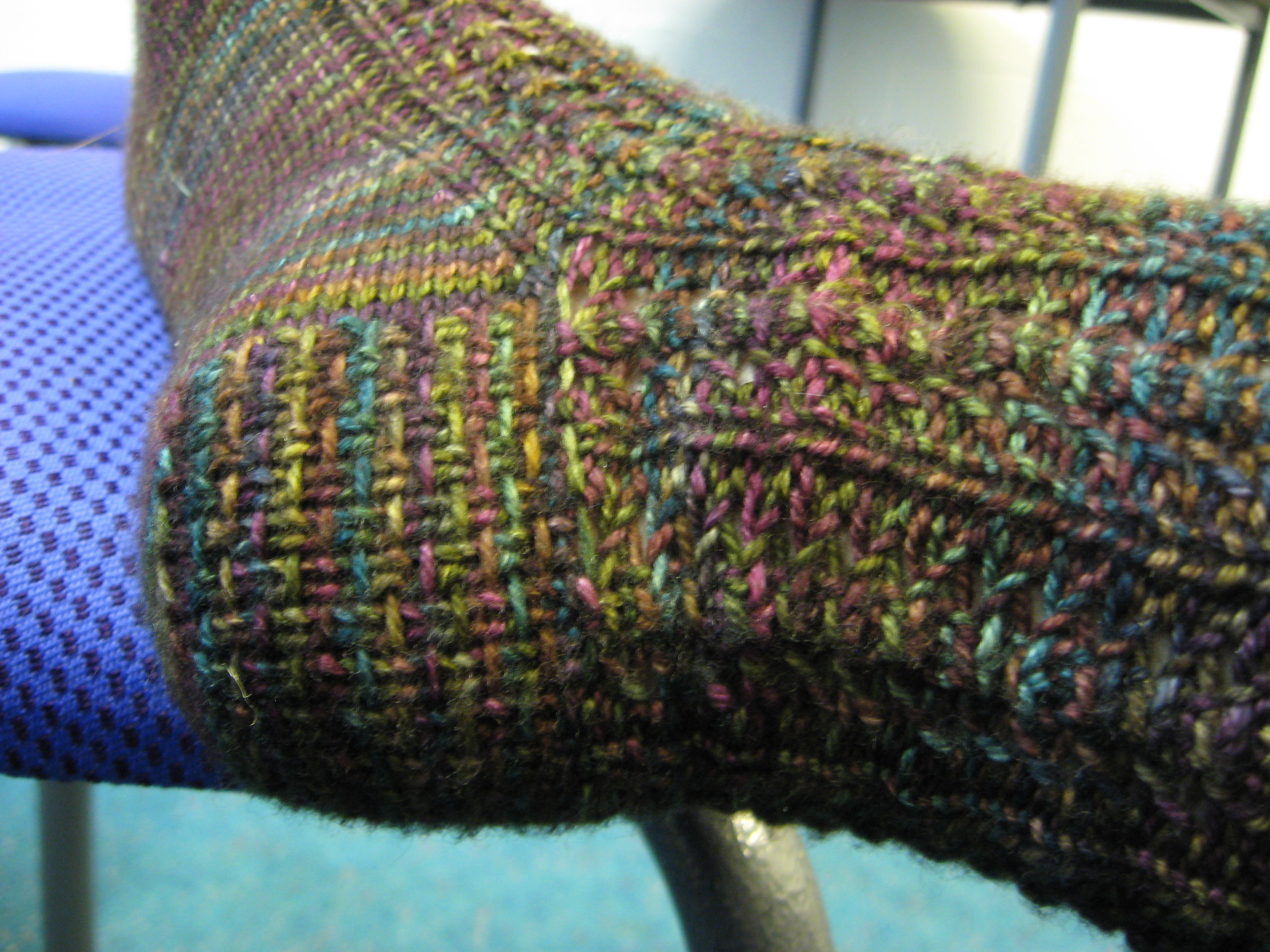
Linen stitch (on heel)

== See also ==
- Basic knitted fabrics
- Binding off
- Casting on
- Knitting
- Knitting abbreviations
