= Knitting (disambiguation) =

Knitting is a method by which yarn is turned into fabric.

Knit, knitted, or knitting may also refer to:

- Hand knitting
- Knit line, another name for meld line or weld line, the line where two flow fronts meet
- Knit product, another name for Zappa–Szép product, a mathematical term
- Knitted fabric
- Knitting, bone healing

== Film ==
- Knitting (film), a 2008 Chinese film directed by Yin Lichuan
- The Knitting, a 2012 South Korean short film directed by Yoon Eun-hye

== See also ==
- History of knitting
- List of knitting stitches
