= Dip stitch =

Knitting technique

In knitting, a dip stitch is made by knitting into a stitch (or even the space between stitches) of an earlier row.

The most common type of dip stitch is to knit into the row below, which may be used for visual effect or to increase the number of stitches (a lifted increase). Knitting into the row below and dropping the stitch above is a quick alternative to brioche knitting, which is normally done by knitting together a yarn over and a slip stitch.

Longer dip stitches can be made for visual effects; they draw a narrow V-shaped pair of yarns from any earlier to any later point in the knitting. Popular motifs made with dip stitches include flowers, flower-stem leaves and fans.
