= Buttonhole (knitting) =

In knitting, buttonholes can be made in several ways.

== Buttonhole techniques (knitting) ==
- Eyelet buttonhole -- Work to desired buttonhole location, yarn over, decrease.
- Vertical buttonhole -- Knit to desired buttonhole location, attach a second yarn and begin knitting with this yarn; knit the two fabrics flanking the buttonhole independently until the work reaches the desired length of the buttonhole. Rejoin the two flanks, drop the other yarn end, and work as one again.
- Vertical buttonhole without breaking the yarn -- Knit half of the stitches of the button band back and forth until the piece reaches the desired length of the buttonhole. Finish with a row that ends at the buttonhole. Without turning the work, make one yarn over for every two rows you've just worked on the half of the stitches. Continue to make the button band and the main fabric of the project. When you get to one stitch before the yarn overs at the buttonhole, work that stitch together with one of the yarn overs, then turn the work. Continue to work on your project, knitting one stitch together with a yarn over every time you get to the buttonhole until there is one yarn over left between two sides of the buttonhole. In the next row, work that yarn over together with the stitch in front of it, and continue to work on your project.
- Two-row buttonhole (horizontal) -- Bind off an appropriate number of stitches and cast them back on in the next row. The yarn is usually woven into the bound off stitches, for reinforcement.
- One-row buttonhole (horizontal) -- Work to where you want the buttonhole to be. Slip next stitch, move yarn to the back of work, slip second stitch, pass first slipped stitch over the second, slip next stitch, pass second stitch over the third, and repeat until desired width of buttonhole is reached. Turn work and, by using the cable cast-on or backward loop cast on, cast on the number of stitches bound off plus one. Turn work again. Slip the next stitch to the right-hand needle and pass the extra cast-on stitch over the slipped stitch.

Any type of knit buttonhole can be strengthened (and given neater edges) with embroidery, specifically the buttonhole stitch.
