= Short row (knitting) =

Knitting technique

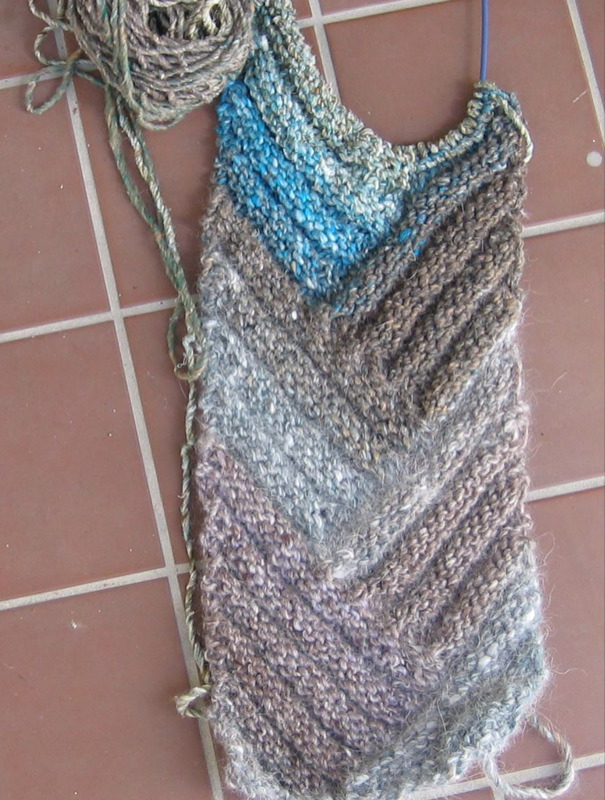
A ribbed scarf hand-knit with a pattern that uses short rows.

In knitting, a short row is a row that is not fully knitted; the work is turned before reaching the end of the row. When working short rows, technique must be employed to prevent holes or gaps where the work is turned. There are several ways to do this. Among the most common are (1) Wrap and Turn, (2) German short rows and (3) Japanese short rows.

== Wrap and turn method ==
In the Wrap and Turn method, just before the work is turned, the working yarn is passed around the next unknitted stitch, forming a “wrap.” Later, this “wrap” is picked up and knitted into a stitch, concealing it from view.

== German short rows ==
In German short rows, the work is turned and the last stitch worked is slipped purlwise with yarn in front to the right needle. Finally, the working yarn is pulled over the top of the needle to the back, which rotates the stitch on the needle so that it tips backwards, forming what appears to be a double-stitch, sometimes referred to as a “German double stitch”. The working yarn stays to the back for the next stitch if it is to be knitted, or rotated below the right needle and pulled to the front, if it is to be purled, both of which maintain the proper (“tipped back”) orientation of the German double stitch. Eventually, this German double stitch is worked like a single stitch, which masks its appearance as viewed from the Right Side to look like a regular stitch.

== Japanese short rows ==
In Japanese short rows, a locking stitch marker is used to hold the loop of the working yarn at the turning point. Eventually, the loop is picked up (and stitch marker removed) and worked together with the stitch on the other side of the gap. This is just another way of doing Wrap and Turn as the loop is stored on a stitch marker rather than stored around another stitch. Because the formed loop is usually smaller around a stitch marker than around a stitch, Japanese short rows are usually slightly tighter than Wrap and Turn.

Of the three methods listed here, Japanese short rows usually results in the tidiest turning point with the least extraneous yarn bulk. It is the preferred method when working short rows in lace, or with lighter weight yarns.

== Usages ==
The typical bobble provides a simple illustration of short rows. The extra bobble stitches are knitted back and forth several times without knitting the entire row.

Short rows may be used to bend a flat ribbon of knitting, which requires more fabric on the outside of the curve than on the inside of the curve. Short rows introduced on the outside edge will cause the ribbon to bend.

Similar to increases and decreases, a common use for short rows is in shaping, e.g., in making sock heels, shaping the neck of a sweater or cardigan, or adding French darts near the bust point. Short rows introduce extra rows ("courses") of knitting, whereas increases introduce extra columns ("wales"). In principle, any shaping possible with other increase/decrease method is also possible with short rows. However, such shaping may be more challenging to visualize.

Short rows are also useful in making more attractive bound off edges over multiple rows, e.g., in a raglan armhole, in a sleeve cap, or over a shoulder slant. The stitches to be bound off can be "held in reserve" on the knitting needles without being knitted using short rows. At the end, all the stitches can be bound off at once, producing a more continuous edge without the typical "ladder" of decreases.
