= Arm knitting =

Knitting technique

Arm knitting is a knitting technique which uses the knitter's arms instead of knitting needles. This method of knitting gained popularity during 2013 and 2014.

== Process ==
Arm knitting typically uses yarn in a size of 6 or "extra bulky". Knitters can decide the number of skeins they want to use based on desired thickness and length. Scissors are the only other tool than the knitter's arms. Normal crafts that can be made with arm knitting are blankets, scarves, infinity scarves, and cowls. Tutorials claim that the knitter can create a scarf in thirty minutes, though it can be around an hour depending on the length and width of the scarf.

- First the knitter must cast on to their arm with a slipknot and a tail. The number of stitches that are cast on determine the width of the scarf, blanket, or cowl.
- After the desired number of stitches the knitting begins. The stitches are switched between both arms. This process continues until the craft is at the desired length.
- Stopping the knitting is a process known as binding off. To bind off the knitter will knit two stitches and then move the stitch closest to the body over the stitch further from the body. This process continues until all the stitches are bound off.
- Once the project has been bound off it can be sewn together to make an infinity scarf, or for blankets it can be left as is. It is also possible to create fringes on the ends of the scarf instead of making it into an infinity scarf.
