= Buttonhole (disambiguation) =

A buttonhole is a hole in a fabric that is paired with a functional button that serves as a fastener.

Buttonhole may also refer to:

- Buttonhole (floral), a flower or floral decoration worn by men
- Buttonhole (knitting), a buttonhole in a knitted fabric

== See also ==
- Buttonholer
