= Elongated stitch =

In knitting, an elongated stitch is a stitch that is longer than others. It may be created by wrapping the yarn around the righthand needle two or more times, or by placing yarn overs between stitches and dropping them on the next row. Elongation is often used in combination with other stitch techniques that produce textured effects in the fabric, as well as in lace work where it is used to create open areas. Works that involve elongated stitch knitting generally require blocking in order to finish the piece.
