= Brioche knitting =

Family of knitting patterns

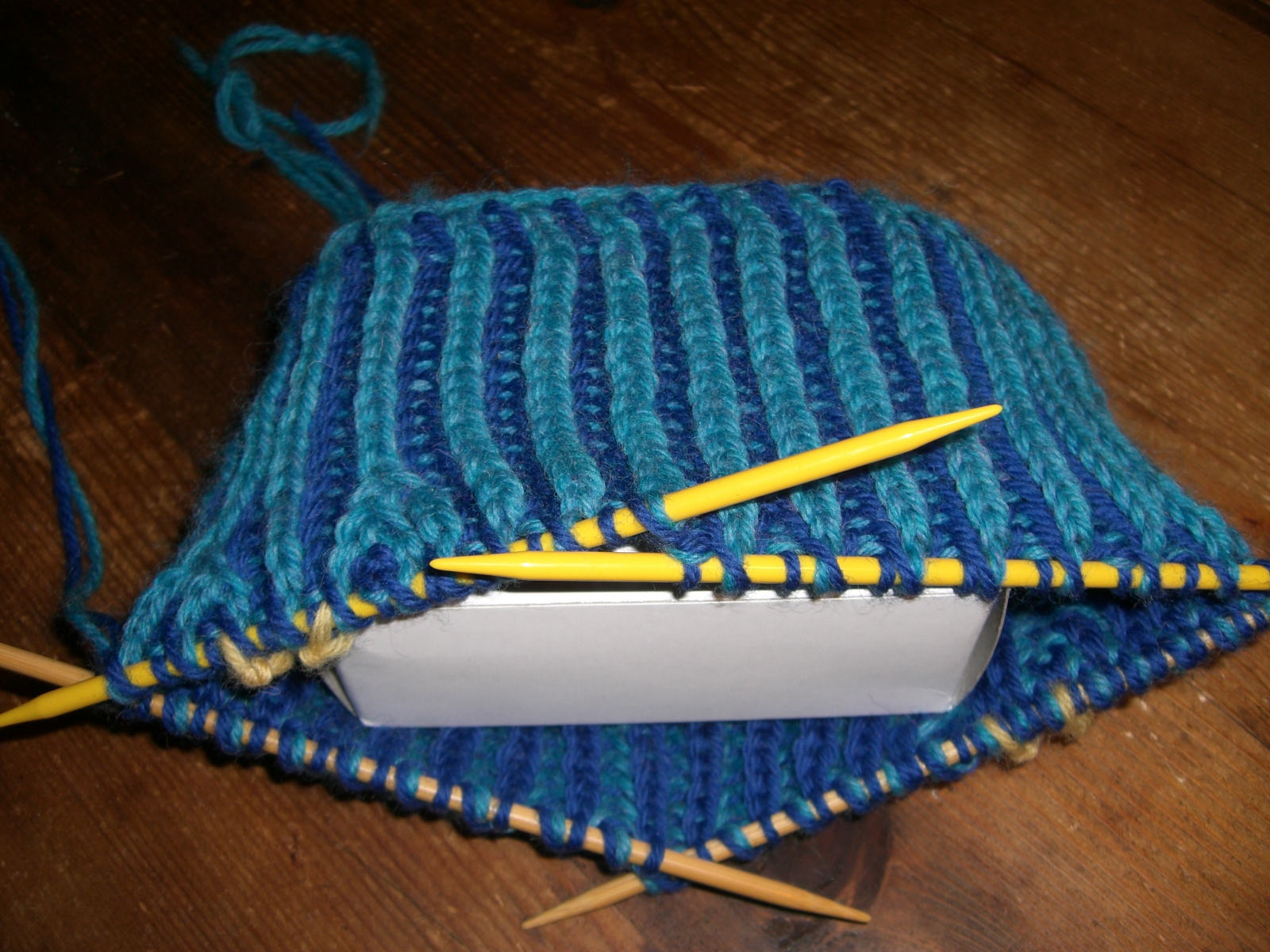
Two-color Brioche knitting

Brioche knitting is a family of knitting patterns involving tucked stitches, i.e., yarn overs that are knitted together with a slipped stitch from the previous row. Such stitches may also be made by knitting into the row below (equivalent to the slipped stitch) and dropping the stitch above (equivalent to the yarn over).

These two approaches provide four ways to form brioche fabric: (1) making a yarn over before slipping every purl stitch, then knitting the pairs together in the next row, (2) making a yarn over before slipping every knit stitch, then purling the pairs together in the next row, (3) knitting into the stitch below, and (4) purling into the stitch below.

The tucked stitches may form a second layer of knitting in front of the first layer, resembling an array of arches or (seen upside-down) of fish scales.

Brioche knitting may have originated in the Middle East. However, the term "brioche" seems to have derived from French slang for "mistake". The name might be a reference to the brioche dinner roll, which is formed of two pieces, one stacked atop the other.

Brioche stitch is also known as English rib (mostly in Europe).

Brioche Stitch is included in Barbara G. Walker's A Treasury of Knitting Patterns and in Elizabeth Zimmermann's Knitting Without Tears. Nancy Marchant introduced several varieties of the brioche stitch to American knitters with her book Brioche Knitting, inspired by the brioche knitting she found very prevalent in the Netherlands. The brioche stitch can be used to knit any kind of garment or project that regular knitting can be used for, but will be double-thick. Nancy Marchant standardized brioche-knitting abbreviations and terminology so that knitters worldwide could share patterns and understand the abbreviations.

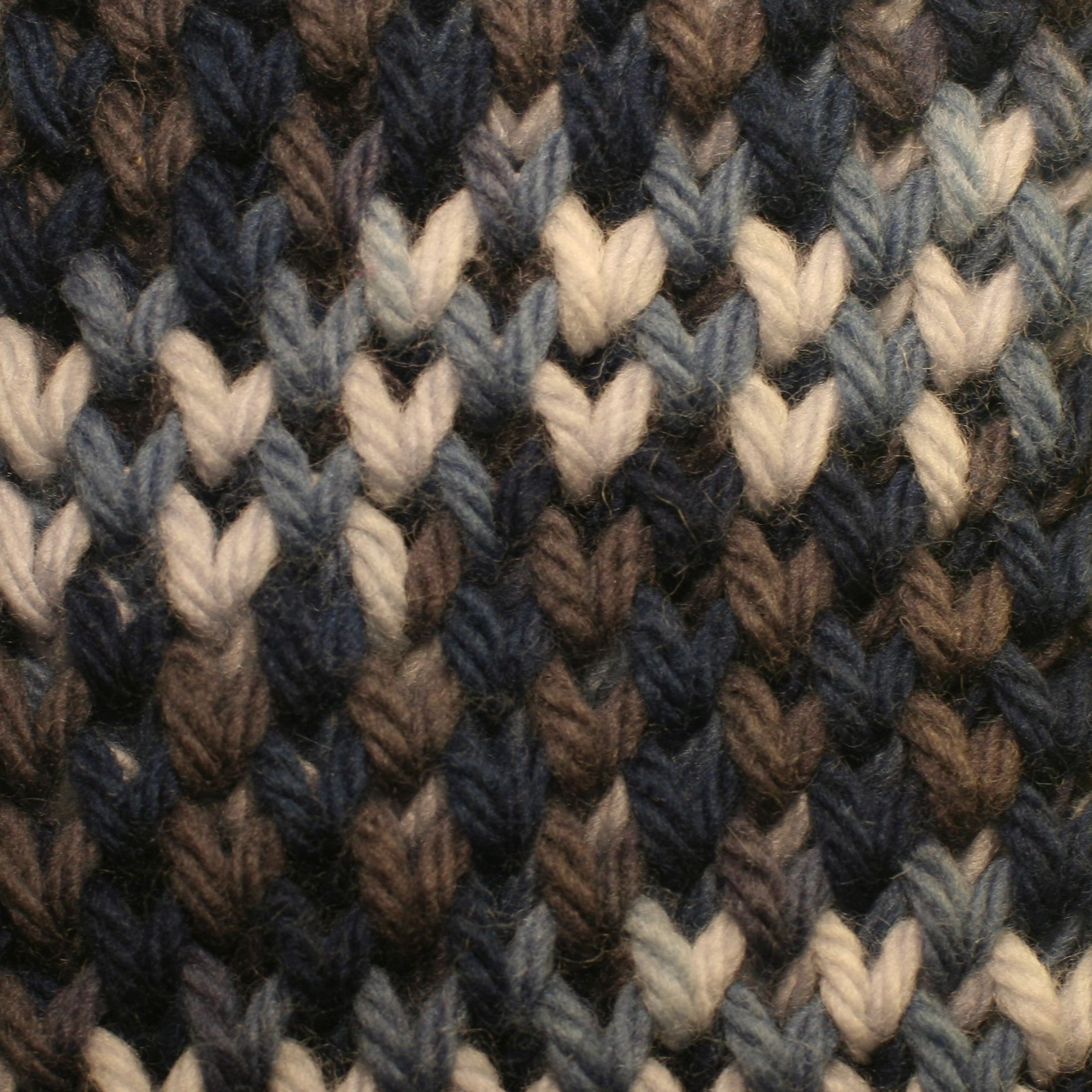
Two-color Honeycomb Brioche in a variegated yarn

Marchant has attempted to standardize and simplify the terminology for the stitch. She defines the basic stitch of brioche knitting as the brioche-knit stitch, which she calls the "bark" stitch (abbreviated "brk"), which consists of a knit-stitch knitted together with its "wrap", a yarnover from the previous row. The brioche-purl stitch (or the "burp" stitch (abbreviated "brp") is the purled version.

Each bark or burp stitch is followed by a yarn-front, slip-one, yarnover (yf-sl1yo). This sets up the bark and burp stitches for the next row.

In brioche knitting, it takes two "passes" to complete a single row of knitting, since only half the stitches are knitted each time. The other half are slipped. For this reason, it takes more conscious effort to be able to count rows and stitches and measure gauge.
