= Increase (knitting) =

Knitting term

In knitting, an increase is the creation of one or more new stitches, which may be done by various methods that create distinctive effects in the fabric. Most knitting increases either lean towards the left or the right.

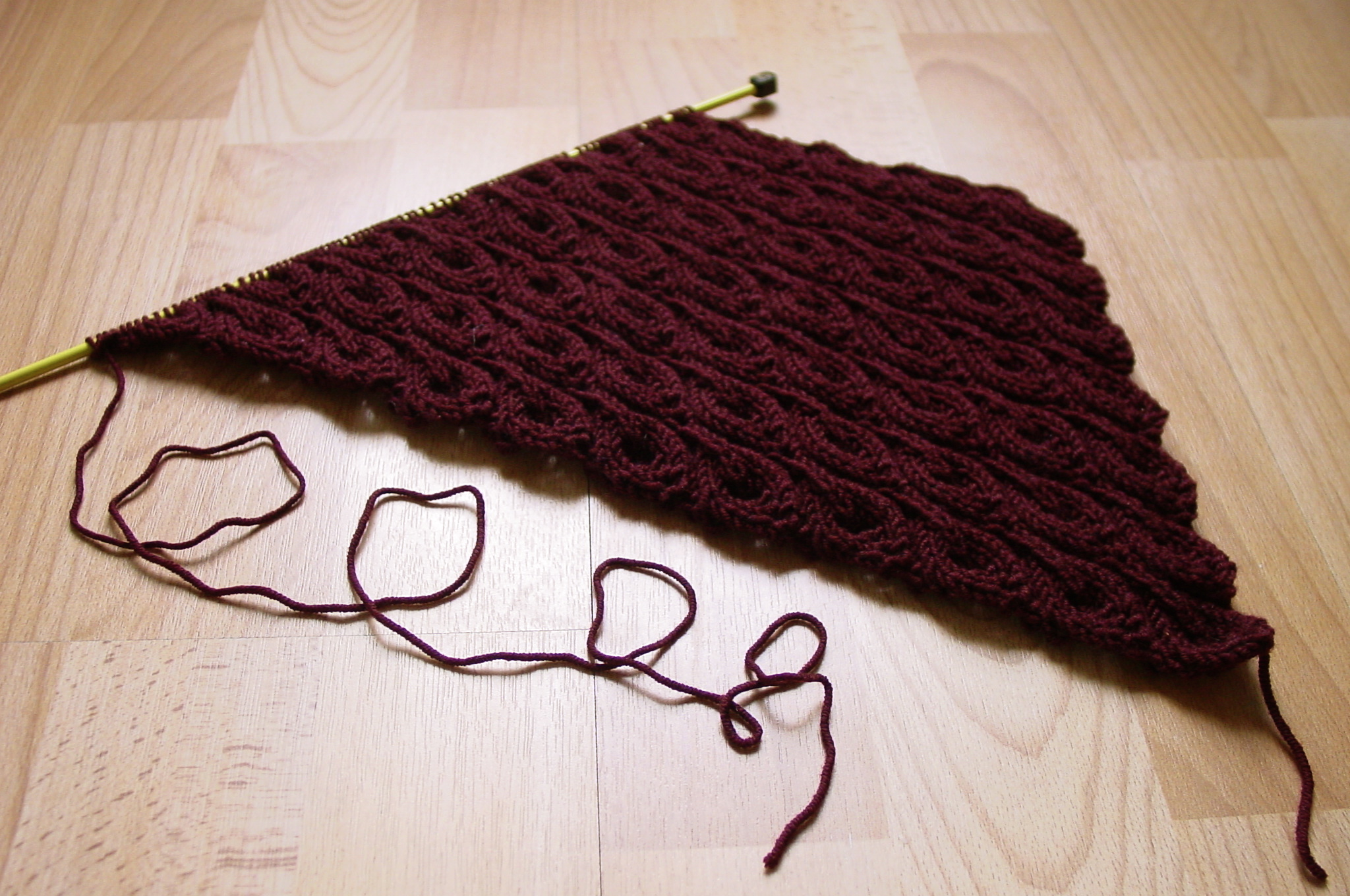
Example of a knitting increase and decrease

== Methods of single increasing (knitting) ==
- Yarn-over increase or "eyelet increase" – The simplest increase is to do a yarn-over between two existing stitches. On subsequent rows, the yarn-over will be knitted, making a new stitch. This disadvantage of this method is that a small hole (eyelet) is produced at the yarn-over. This can be improved by twisting the yarn-over stitch - similar to a "make one" (below) or purling the increase through the back loop in the return row.
- Raised Increase – Lift the strand connecting two knitted stitches in the row below onto the left needle (effectively producing a yarn-over) and knit it, either normally or twisted. This method (especially if twisted) leaves almost no hole, since forming the yarn-over stitch from the (presumably tight) connecting strand draws the two neighboring stitches together. If the strand is picked up coming from the front, the result will be a right-leaning decrease (M1R). If it is picked up from the back, the result will be a left-leaning decrease (M1L)
- Bar increase – Knit the stitch normally but without transferring the knitted stitch to the right needle; the same stitch is then knitted through the back loop (KFB - knit front & back). This increase creates a bar or a nub on the fabric.
- Moss increase – Knit the stitch normally but without transferring the knitted stitch to the right needle; the same stitch is then purled. This increase makes a bar or nub on the fabric.
- Lifted Increase – For a right-side increase, knit into the right leg of the stitch of the row below the next stitch to be knit, then knit the next stitch. For a left-side increase, knit one stitch, then knit into the left leg of the stitch of the row below it through the back loop. This kind of increase can be visually subtle.
- Pulled Increase – For a right-side increase, pull a loop from the space between the first and the second stitches on the left-hand needle, then knit the first stitch on the left-hand needle. For a left-side increase, slip one stitch purlwise to the right-hand needle, then pull a loop from the space between the first and the second stitches on the right-hand needle, return the slipped stitch to the left-hand needle, knit this stitch through the back loop, and slip the pulled loop purlwise to the right-hand needle. This is a textured decorative increase.
- "Make One" (M1) – Place a half-hitch loop on the needle between two stitches, either before or after, and twisted either left or right, depending on the desired effect.
- Column of Increases – A second strand of yarn or roving is passed up the piece. The second strand is used to make an extra stitch in each row by knitting a doubled stitch up from the lower row. The resulting piece has one more stitch in each row and each row is in the shape of an inverted V. The column of increases is used to make square sweater yokes.
- Double Increases - Knit into the back of a stitch without transferring the stitch to the right needle, knit into the back loop of the same stitch, again without transferring the stitch, and then one more time into the front loop. This general concept can also be applied to raised increases or yarn over increases. Unlike all other increases, double decreases typically are centered and have no slant.

Finally, a large number of increases in a row is best done by casting on; examples include buttonholes, etc. Increases are typically placed on the right side of a project but there are also purl increases for the wrong side.

== Role in fabric shaping ==
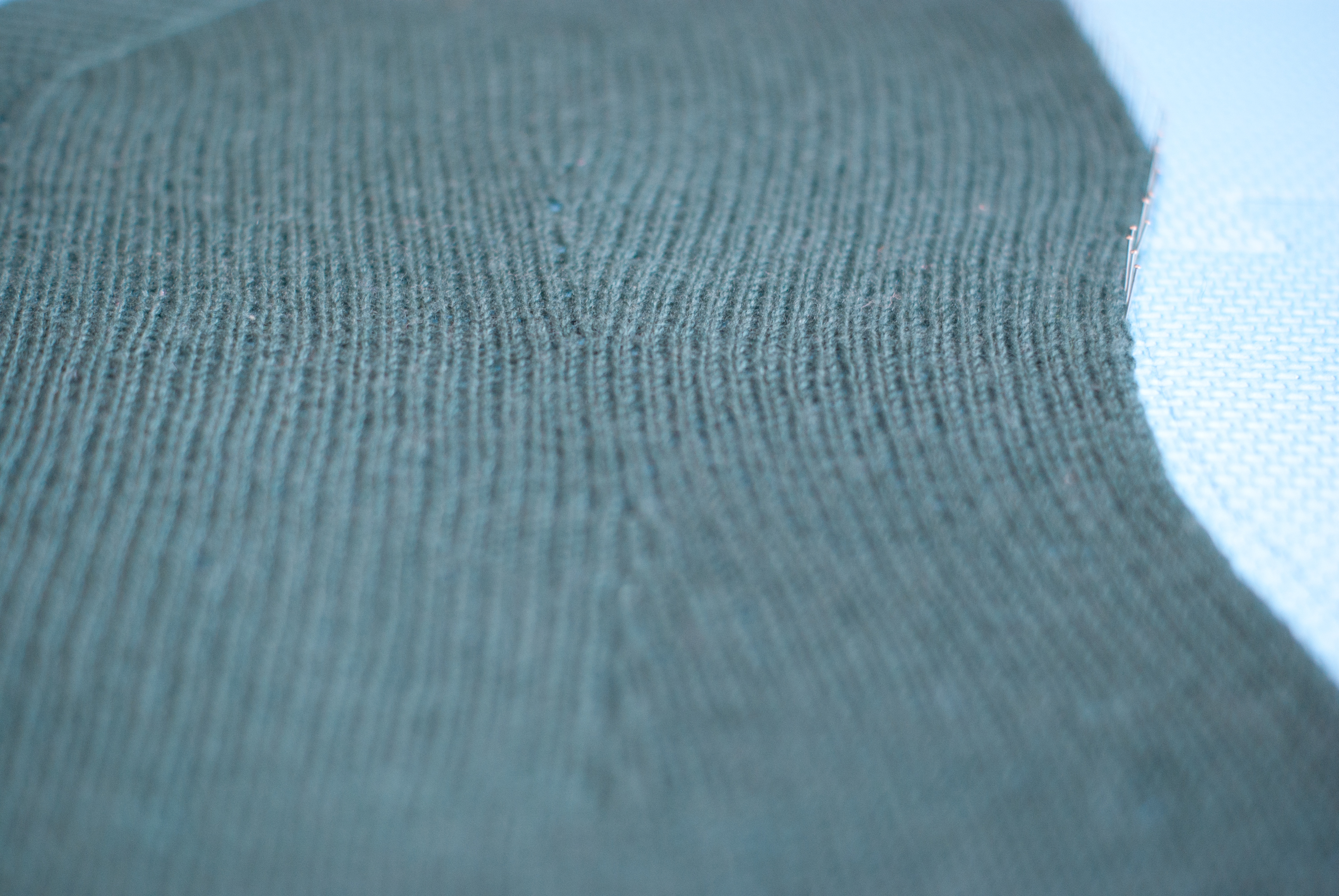
Knitting increase shapes a sweater pattern

The typical use for increases and decreases is to taper a flat piece of knitted fabric, e.g., in widening the sleeve of a sweater from the wrist to the biceps. However, increases and decreases can also be used to produce curvature, i.e., to make the knitted fabric cup (positive curvature) or gather (negative curvature); in woven fabrics, this curvature is produced with darts, flares and gussets. A great advantage of knitted fabrics is that they can be shaped nearly invisibly without seams or cutting (as woven fabrics must) with increases, decreases, and/or short rows. Lace patterns also make use of increases by immediately combining them with increases. As a result, the stitch count doesn't change but the knitter can create stunning patterns through the eyelets, bars, and slanting lines these stitches create.

== See also ==
- Sweater design
