= Casting on (knitting) =

Family of knitting techniques for adding new stitches

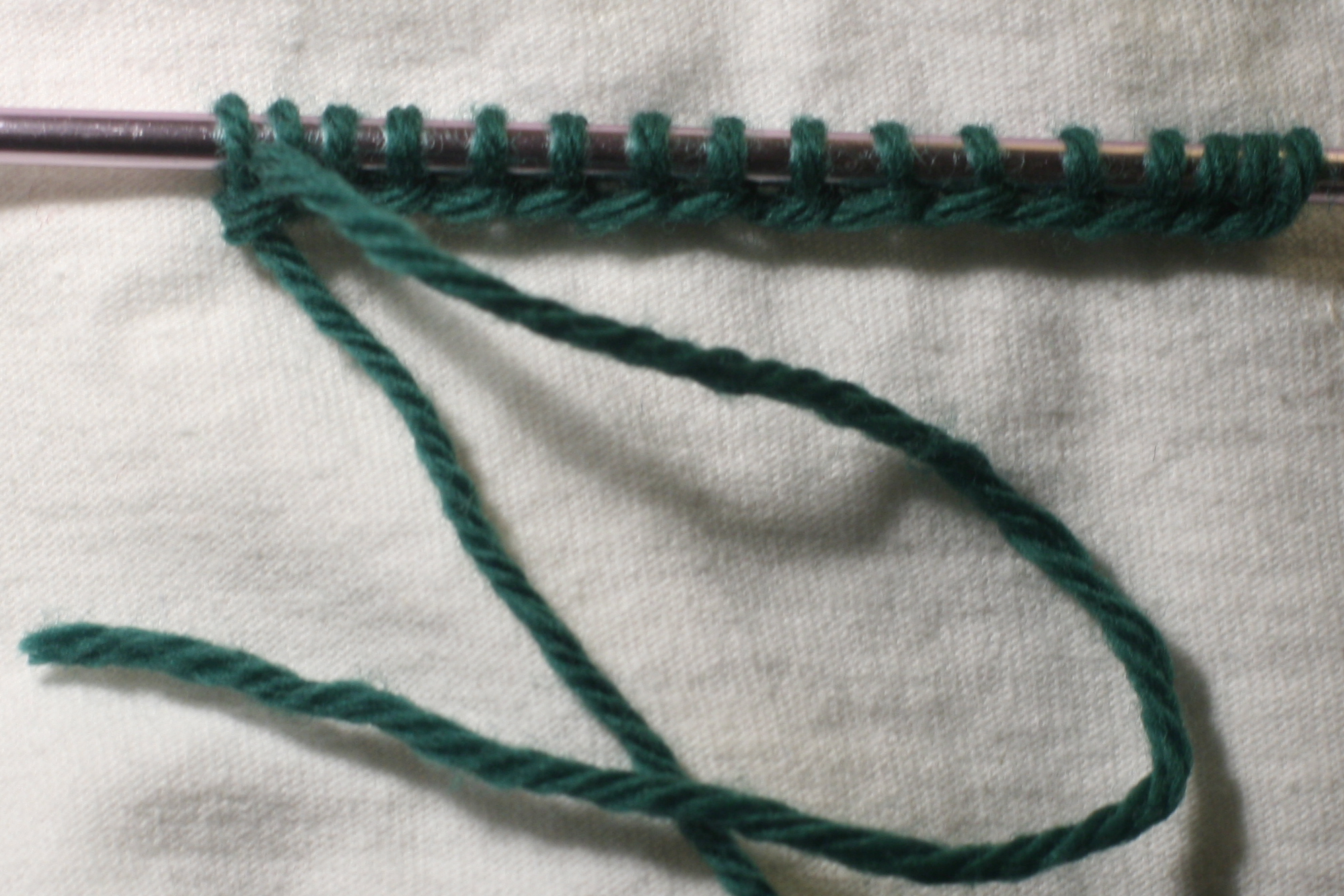
Long-tail cast-on

Casting on from one loop (more loops will be added to the top of the needle)

In knitting, casting on is a family of techniques for adding new stitches that do not depend on earlier stitches, i.e., having an independent lower edge. In principle, it is the opposite of binding off, but the techniques involved are generally unrelated.

The cast-on can also be decorated with various stitch patterns, especially picots. The cast-on stitches can also be twisted clockwise or counterclockwise as they are added to the needle; this is commonly done for the single cast-on described below to give it a neater, more uniform look.

Casting on is sometimes done with doubled-up needles or a needle of larger size than for the main pattern; the extra bit of yarn in each stitch makes the edge less tight and gives it more flexibility.

When casting on at the beginning, one end of the yarn is usually secured to the knitting needle by knotting it, typically with a slip knot. This knot is unnecessary when casting on in the middle of the fabric (e.g., when making the upper edge of a buttonhole) since the yarn is already secured to the fabric. The original slip knot can be pulled out after a few rows have been knitted without damaging the knitted fabric. It is also possible to cast on using a simple twisted loop.

Once one loop has been secured around the needle, or if it is already secured to the fabric, there are several different methods for adding others.

== Methods for casting on in handknitting ==
Knit-on cast-on
Perhaps the most straightforward method, in which a new loop is drawn through the previous loop and then added to the needle. However, this method is deprecated for giving an untidy edge. It can also be done in a purl version or even a rib version.
Cable cast-on
A closely related technique, in which a new loop is drawn through the space between the two previous loops and then added to the needle. This edge is firm and has a neat, corded look; although it may be too bulky with thick yarns.
Single cast-on
An even simpler method, also called the "simple cast-on" or "backward loop cast-on", which involves adding a series of half hitches to the needle. This creates a very stretchy, flexible edge. It is a common approach for adding several stitches to the edge in the middle of a knitted fabric, but it is difficult to knit from and make even. A variation is the twisted simple cast on, where one twists the new loop around the thumb, with the yarn going around the back of the thumb to the front as in the simple cast-on, but picking up the new loop from the backside of the loop. This is tighter and neater but has less elasticity.
Long tail cast-on
A common method, in which all the loops are made with one yarn, while the other end (the dangling end from the original slip knot) is used to secure the base of each loop. The loops will appear like knit stitches. This method is also called the "knit half-hitch cast on". Although popular, this method requires that the knitter estimate the length of the dangling yarn before the stitches are cast on; if the dangling yarn is too short, the knitter will run out of yarn with which to secure the stitches before the full number of stitches have been cast on. In that case, the knitter will have to pull everything out, re-position the slip knot to give a longer tail, and begin anew. This can be avoided by estimating the length of the dangling yarn in advance, using one of several available methods. Despite this shortcoming, it is a good all-around method for casting on. Another variation for this method is to use two different yarns, one being the main yarn used in the project, and the second being a piece of contrasting waste yarn. One attaches the two with a slip knot, and then using the waste or contrast yarn as the long tail, starts the row. This is useful if for picking up stitches on the cast-on edge in order to knit in the opposite direction. One can also use it decoratively, making the contrast or waste yarn a part of the pattern design.
To execute it, start by figuring out how much yarn is required for the cast-on row, and pull out that amount of yarn. With that, put a slip knot on the needle (this is not absolutely necessary, since the first cast-on stitch will create a slip knot in the process, but it is generally more secure to start with a slip knot). Hold the needle in the right hand and the yarn in the left, with the long tail pulled around the thumb and hanging in front, and the yarn from the ball around the first or second finger, with the ball tail heading toward the back. Once completed, take the needle under the front of the long tail, picking up a half hitch, then back to the yarn over the finger from the top side of the yarn, pulling the loop through the half hitch formed.
:This cast-on can also be done in a purl and a twisted stitch version as well.
Tubular cast-on
Involves knitting onto a cast on row knitted in a contrasting yarn with half as many stitches. Each knit stitch into the contrasting stitches is followed by a yarn-over to double the number of stitches. After several rows, a tuck is formed by knitting together the first and third rows, forming a tube through which elastic can be pulled. A neat edge, nicely suited for 1×1 ribbing.
Provisional cast-on
Also known as an "invisible cast-on", since the waste yarn used can be pulled out later to allow the knitter to continue the knitting in the opposite direction. This cast-on is also the best method for double-knit fabrics, since the knitting has no boundary; the knitting is continuous from one side of the fabric to the other. Holding the ends of a waste yarn and the working yarn, make an overhand knot. Place a needle held in the left hand between the two yarns, with the knot below, the waste yarn held underneath and parallel to the needle out to the right, and the working yarn up and in front of the needle. Bring the working yarn down behind the needle and in front of the waste yarn; up behind the waste yarn and over-and-up then down in front of the needle; down behind the waste yarn; then up in front of the needle. Repeat for each two stitches. When the desired number of stitches is reached, loosely fasten the waste yarn and work as usual with the working yarn. To take out the provisional cast-on, unfasten the end of the waste yarn and carefully pull it out, picking up the now loose loops on a needle and working from the opposite direction of previous work.
Two-needle cast-on
Similar to a long tail cast-on, but using two needles held together. The half-hitch part is formed around the lower needle, while the loop is only wrapped around the upper needle. The second needle is removed before the first round.
Braided cast-on
Frequently used in mitten edges.
Chain cast-on
Uses a crochet hook or two knitting needles. To execute, hold a knitting needle in left hand and crochet hook or second knitting needle in right hand. Make a slip-knot in yarn and put it on the crochet hook or right-hand needle. Wrap the yarn from the back of the left-hand needle and over to the front, over the crochet hook or right needle, pass the slip-knot loop over the wrap, leaving the new loop on the crochet hook or right needle. Repeat, wrapping the yarn over the left-hand needle before passing it over the crochet hook or right needle to make a new loop, until there is one less stitch than required. Place the last loop on the left-hand needle as the first stitch that will be worked. This cast-on creates an edge that mimics a standard bind-off edge.
Crochet chain cast-on
For this, do a simple crochet chain. Once the chain is large enough to equal the number of stitches needed, plus a few extra, turn the chain over so that the bumps that were forming as the yarn was pulled through the hole are visible. Put the knitting needle through those bumps and knit through it as normal. This produces the same edge as knitting on.
Provisional chain cast-on
Simply the crochet chain cast-on using waste yarn; this is also an "invisible cast-on" that can be pulled out later to allow knitting in the opposite direction. Work a crochet chain in waste yarn, loosely fastening the tail end. With working yarn, pick up the chain-bumps, as for the crochet chain cast-on, to create the working stitches. To take out the cast-on, simply pull out the tail of the waste yarn at the fastened end and "zip off" the crochet chain. Pick up the now loose loops and work from the opposite direction of previous work. This is done in toe-up socks and shawls or scarves with directional patterns that need to start from a center edge.
Turkish cast-on
Used for circular beginnings, often for the toes of socks made toe-up. It is invisible (as with the provisional cast-on). Begin with two circular needles held one above the other from above (Upper called A, lower called B). Place a slip-knot on B, and wrap the yarn up behind A. Then begin wrapping it around both needles, down in front and up in back, until the number of wraps equals half the number of stitches needed. Slide B along, through the wraps, until they sit on the cable, and the ends dangle on either side. Then bring the other, loose, end of A up, and knit into the wraps still on A. Once all those wraps are knitted, pull A until the wraps are on the cable, and pull B so that the tip of the needle holds the wraps, pointed to the end with the working yarn. Bring up the other end of B and knit across the wraps again. This completes one round. From here, continue to work around the stitches on the two circular needles, increasing as desired, or switch to double pointed needles or a single circular needle for the Magic Loop method of knitting circularly.
Magic cast-on
Developed by Judy Becker; also known as the "magic toe-up cast-on" due to its popular use in beginning toe-up sock construction. Instructions were first published in an issue of the on-line knitting magazine knitty.com .
Circular cast-on
Popularized by Elizabeth Zimmermann as "Emily Ocker's Circular Beginning".
Old Norwegian cast-on
Also known as the "German twisted cast-on" and similar to the "long-tail cast-on" but uses a longer tail due to a second twist in the thumb loop, giving the cast on edge more stretch than the long-tail cast on. Leaving a tail the necessary length, make a slipknot and place it on a needle held in the right hand. The slipknot counts as the first stitch. Place the thumb and index finger of the left hand between the yarn ends so that the strand connected to the ball is around the index finger and the tail end is around the thumb. Secure the yarn ends with the other fingers and hold the palm upwards, making a V of yarn. Bring the needle in front of the thumb, under both yarns around the thumb, down into the center of the thumb loop, back forward, and over the top of the yarn around the index finger. Use the needle to catch this yarn, then bring the needle back down through the thumb loop, turning the thumb slightly to make room for the needle to pass through. Drop the loop off the thumb and place the thumb back in the V configuration while tightening up the resulting stitch on the needle..
