= Cable knitting =

Knitting style

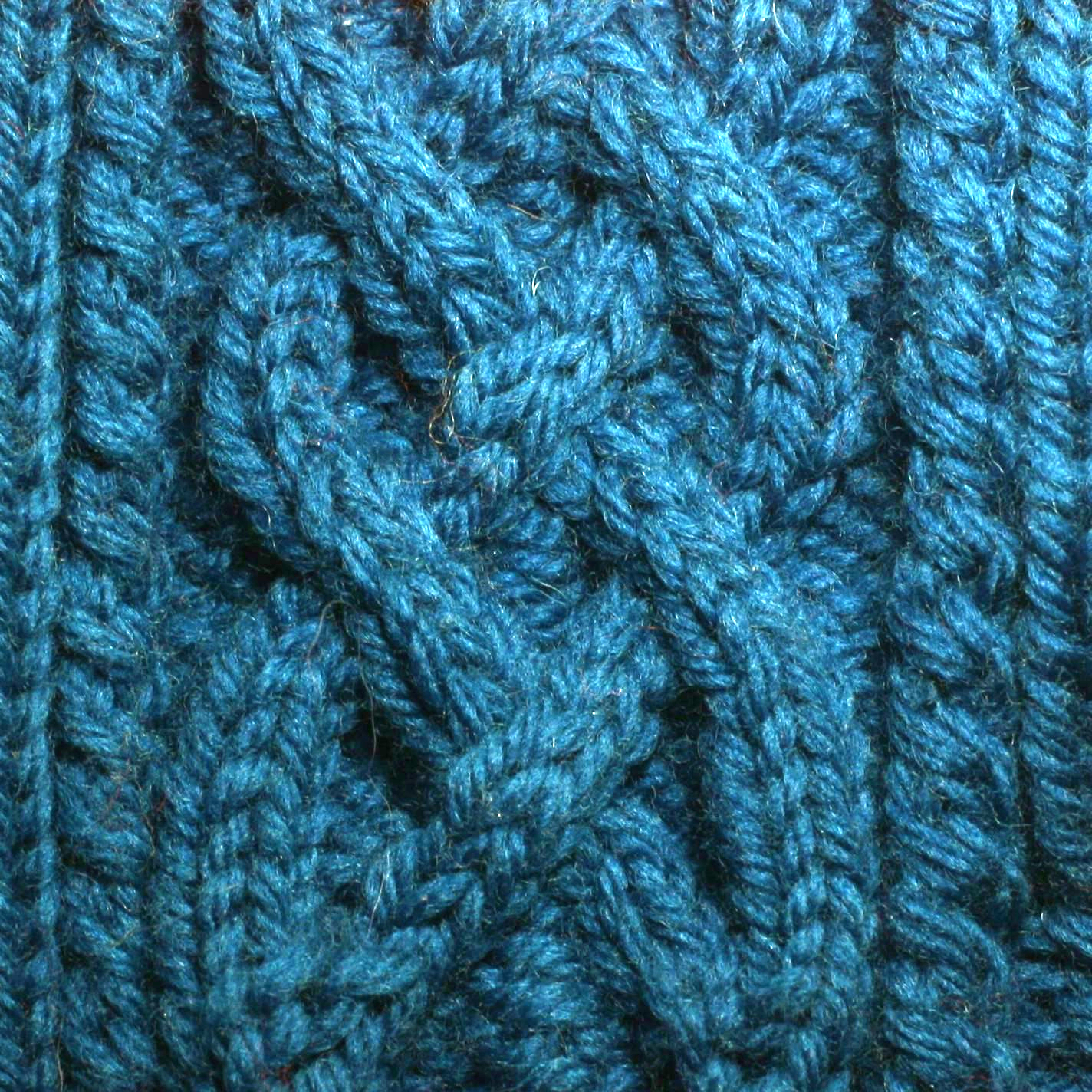
A cable-knit piece of fabric

Cable knitting is a style of knitting in which textures of crossing layers are achieved by permuting stitches. For example, given four stitches appearing on the needle in the order ABCD, one might cross the first two (in front of or behind) the next two, so that in subsequent rows those stitches appear in the new order CDAB.

== Methods ==
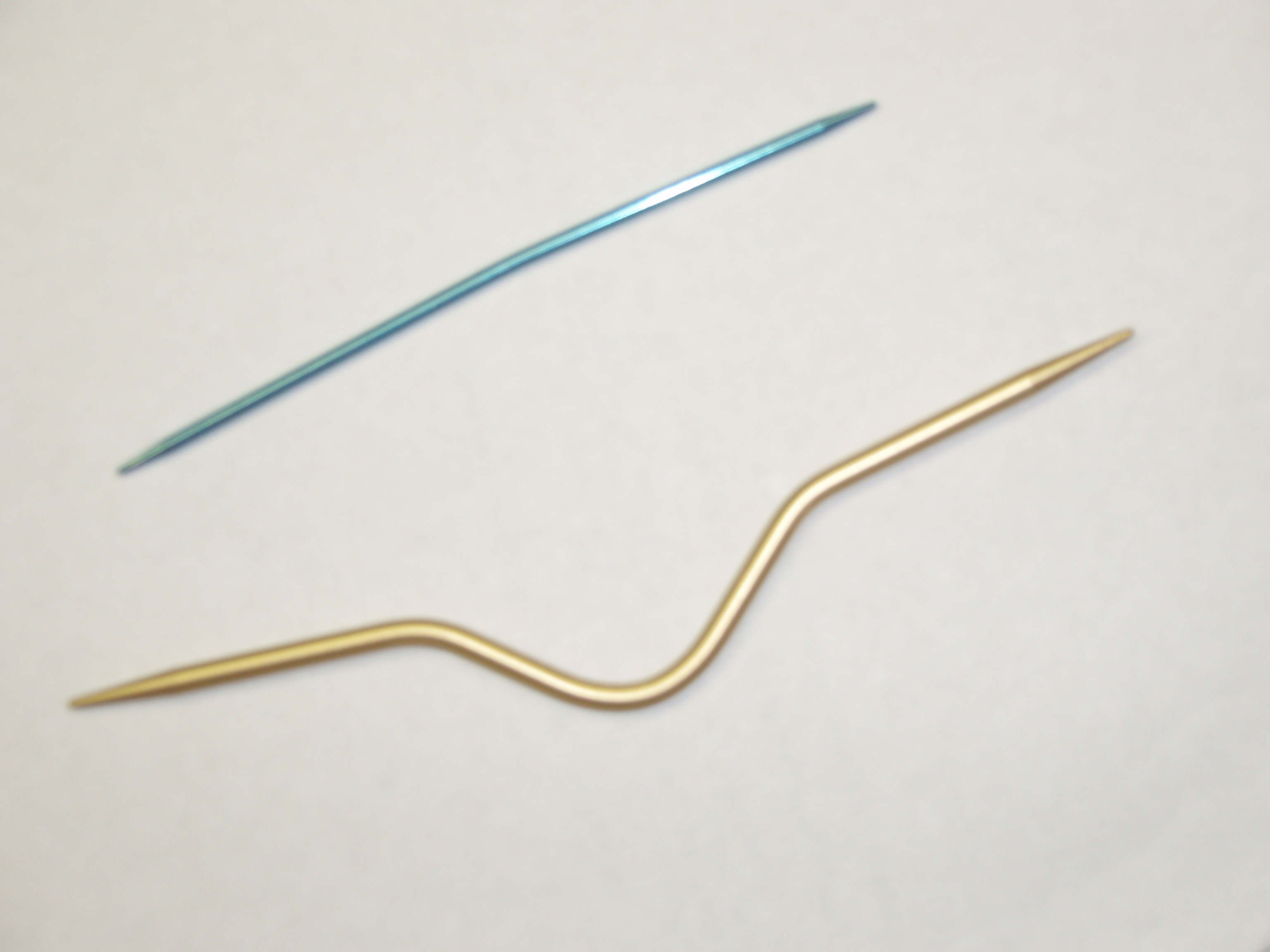
Two different styles of cable needles

The stitches crossing behind are transferred to a small cable needle for storage while the stitches passing in front (or behind) are knitted. The former stitches are then transferred back to the original needle or knitted from the cable needle itself. Instead of a cable needle, some knitters prefer to use a large safety pin or, for a single stitch, simply hold it in their fingers while knitting the other stitch(es). Cabling is typically done only when working on the right side of the fabric, i.e., every other row. This creates a spacer row, which helps the fabric to relax.

Cable knitting usually produces a fabric that is less flexible and more dense than typical knitting, having a much narrower gauge. This narrow gauge should be considered when changing from the cable stitch to another type of knitted fabric. If the number of stitches is not reduced, the second knitted fabric may flare out or pucker, due to its larger gauge. Thus, ribbed cuffs on an Aran sweater may not contract around the wrist or waist, as would normally be expected. Conversely, stitches may need to be added to maintain the gauge when changing from another knitted fabric such as stocking to a cable pattern.

Cables are usually done in stocking stitch and surrounded with reverse stocking; this causes the cables to stand out against a receding background; however, any stitch can be used. Another possible effect is meta-cabling, where the cable itself is consisting of smaller cables, such as a three-cable plait made of strands that are themselves 2-cable plaits. In such cases, the "inner" cables sometimes split directions, forming complex branching patterns. Another effect is to have one cable "pierce" another cable, rather than having it pass over or under the other.

Cable direction can have a left or right slant. Holding stitches to the front of the work on the cable needle creates a cable cross to the left. Holding the stitches to the back of the work will create a slant to the right.

== Cable braids ==
Cables are often used to make braid patterns. Usually, the cables themselves are with a knit stitch while the background is done in purl. As the number of cables increases, the number of crossing patterns increases, as described by the braid group. Various visual effects are also possible by shifting the center lines of the undulating cables, or by changing the space between the cables, making them denser or more open.

A one-cable serpentine is simply a cable that moves sinusoidally left and right as it progresses. Higher-order braids are often made with such serpentines crossing over and under each other.

A two-cable braid can look like a rope, if the cables always cross in the same way (e.g., left over right). Alternatively, it can look like two serpentines, one on top of the other.

A three-cable braid is usually a simple plait (as often seen styled in long hair), but can also be made to look like the links in a chain, or as three independent serpentines.

A four-cable braid allows for several crossing patterns.

The five-cable braid is sometimes called the Celtic princess braid, and is visually interesting because one side is cresting while the other side is in a trough. Thus, it has a shimmering quality, similar to a kris dagger.

The six-cable braid is also called a Saxon braid, and looks square and solid. This is a large motif, often used as a centerpiece of an Aran sweater or along the neckline and hemlines.

The seven-cable braid is rarely used, possibly because it is very wide.

A cable pattern is like a set of serpentine or wave-like cables, each one meandering around its own center line. A vast variety of cable patterns can be invented by changing the number of cables, the separations of their center lines, the amplitudes of their waves (i.e., how far they wander from their center line), the shape of the waves (e.g., sinusoidal versus triangular), and the relative position of the crests and troughs of each wave (e.g., one wave crests as another is crossing its center line).

New cable patterns can also be inspired by pictures, scenes from nature, Celtic knotwork, and even the double helix of DNA.

== Cable lattices ==
In some cases, one can form a lattice of cables, a kind of ribbing made of cables where the individual cable strands can be exchanged freely. A typical example is a set of parallel two-cable plaits in which, every so often, the two cables of each plait separate, going left and right and integrating themselves in the neighbouring cables. In the process, the right-going cable of one plait crosses the left-going cable of its neighbour, forming an "X".

== Cable textures ==
Many patterns made with cables do not have a rope-like quality. For example, a deep honeycomb pattern can be made by adjacent serpentines, first touching the neighbor on the left then the neighbor on the right. Other common patterns include a "Y"-like shape (and its inverse) and a horseshoe crab pattern.

== Aran sweaters ==
Many consider cable knitting to reach its heights in the Aran sweater, which consists of panels of different cable patterns.

== In popular culture ==
Notable cable-knits in film and television include sweaters worn Elvis Presley in Jailhouse Rock, Steve McQueen in the original The Thomas Crown Affair, Harry Burns (Billy Crystal) in When Harry Met Sally..., Hugh Ransom Drysdale (Chris Evans) in Knives Out, and Carmy Berzatto (Jeremy Allen White) on The Bear. Taylor Swift wears an Aran sweater on the cover of the Evermore album.
