= Knitting pattern =

Instructions for hand or machine knitting a particular design

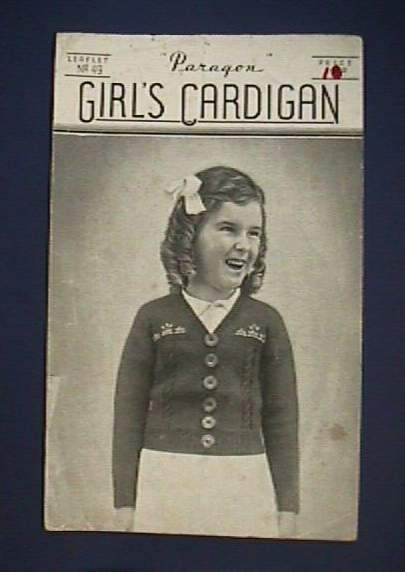
Knitting pattern - Paragon Girls Cardigan Leaflet no 49

A knitting pattern is a set of written instructions on how to construct items using knitting.

== Forms ==
There are two basic forms of knitting patterns:

- Text patterns which use numerals and words (and usually abbreviations), and
- Chart patterns which use symbols in a chart.

Some patterns include the entire instructions in both forms, as some knitters prefer one or the other.

Some patterns mix the forms to take advantage of the best of each. For example, a pattern's start and end may be described in text and a repeated design as a chart.

Each knitting pattern typically provides its own abbreviations and symbol keys or refers to a standard. There is no single authoritative source for knitting symbology and knitting abbreviations, so multiple standards exist. However, there are some knitting abbreviations that are commonly used even across these multiple standards.

Both forms use the convention of sequential row numbers; a row counter is often used to keep track of progress through the pattern.

=== Text patterns ===
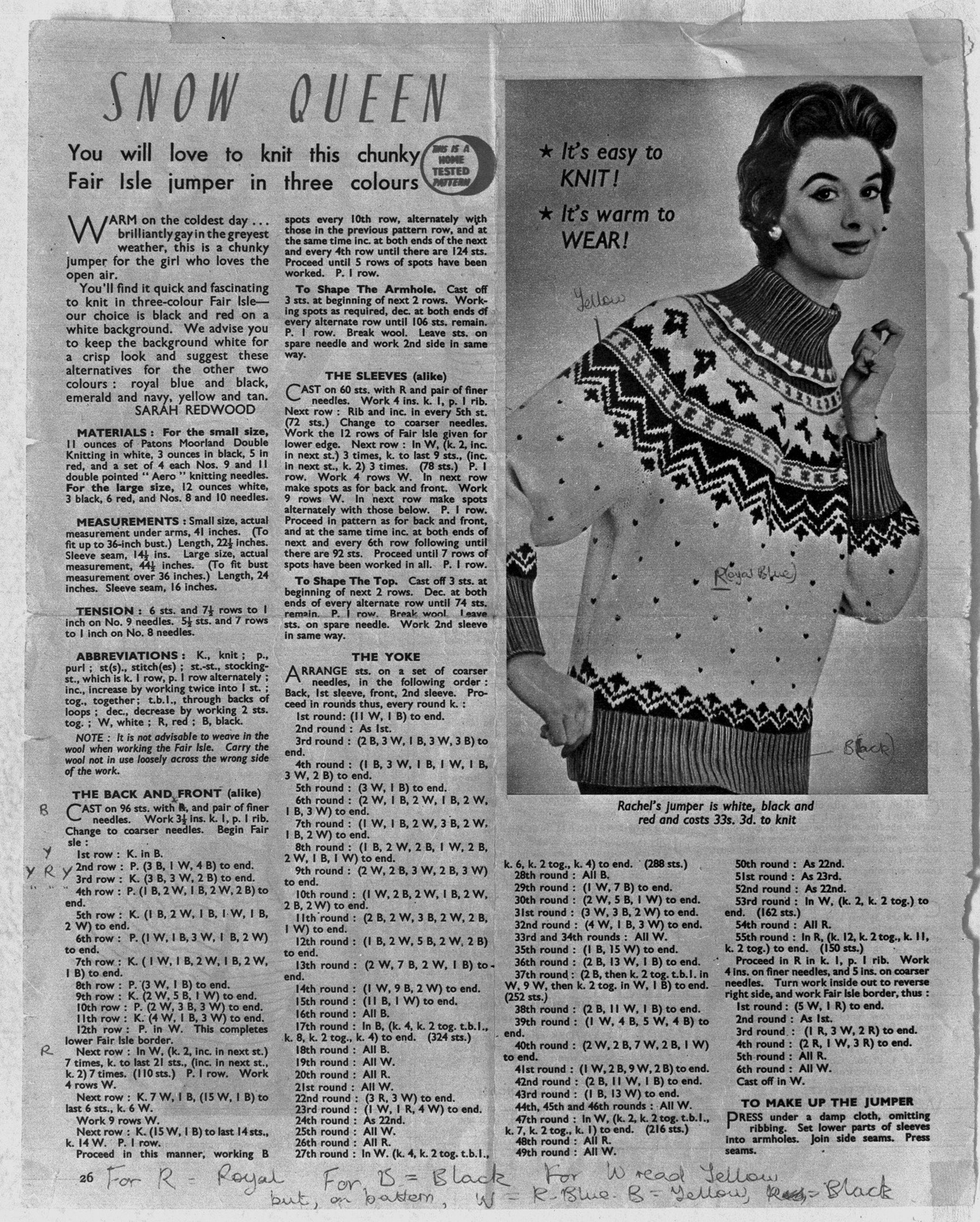
A text knitting pattern from 1959.

Text pattern details can vary from a general description to detailed stitch-by-stitch instruction. Knitting abbreviations are used for brevity.

Text patterns typically provide sequential instructions to be followed and may also include helpful advice.

==== List of common knitting abbreviations ====
Below is a list of common knitting abbreviations used in text patterns.

Abbreviation	Meaning	Notes
k	Knit	May be followed by a number to denote how many times to do the stitch (ex: K3 means to knit three stitches)
p	Purl	May be followed by a number to denote how many times to do the stitch (ex: P3 means to purl three stitches)
st	Stitch	May also be written as s
yo	Yarn over	May also be written as yf or yfwd (yarn forward)
tog	Together	Used in tandem with other knitting abbreviations (ex: K2tog means to knit two stitches together)
sl	Slip	Stitch is slipped purlwise, unless the knitting pattern states otherwise
wyif	With yarn in front	
wyib	With yarn in back	
psso	Pass slipped stitch over	
ssk	Slip 1 stitch knitwise, slip another stitch knitwise, then knit those two stitches together through the back loop	Creates a left-leaning decrease
RS	Right side (of fabric)	
WS	Wrong side (of fabric)	

=== Chart patterns ===
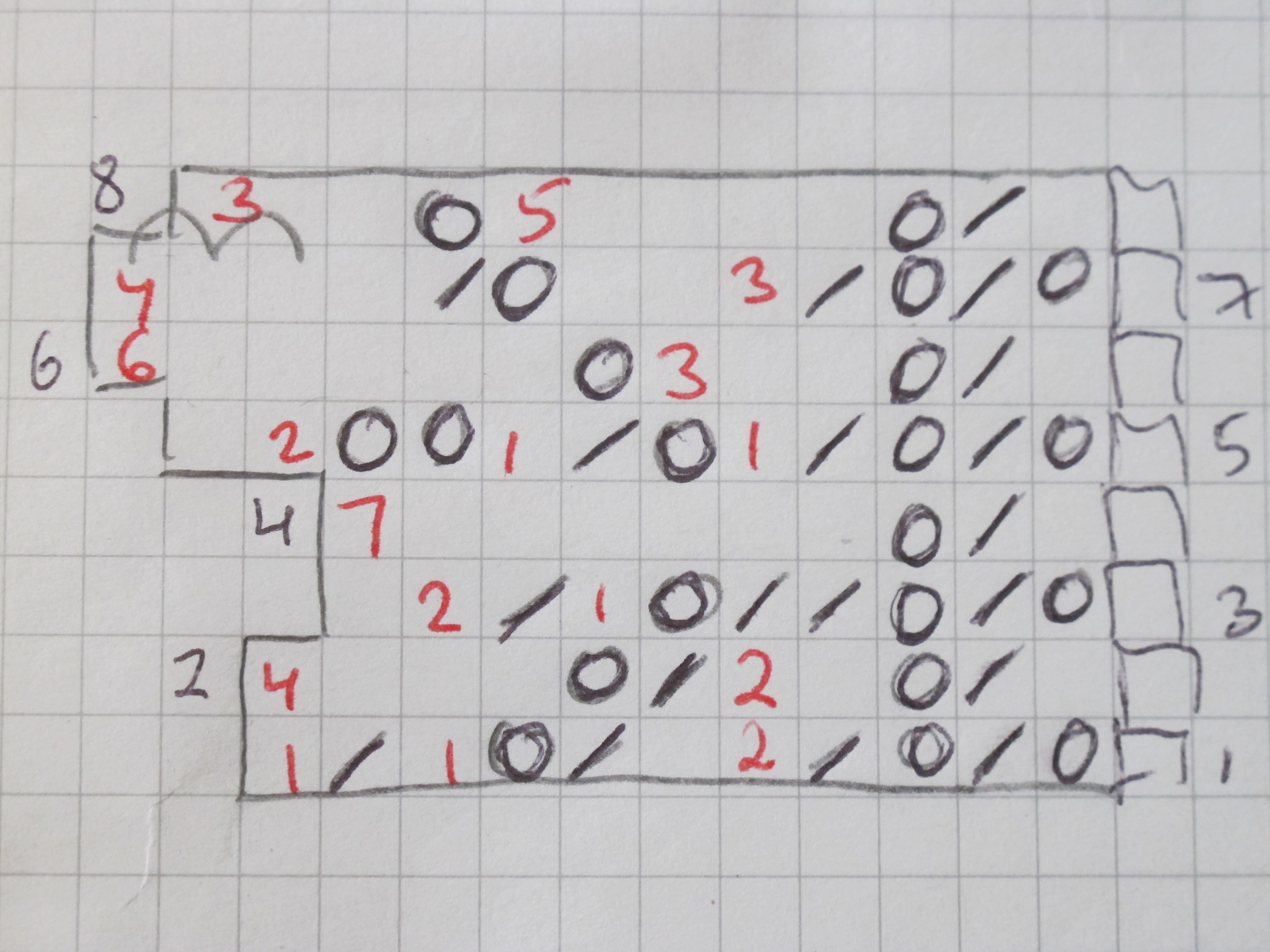
A knitting pattern chart drawn on graph paper. Row numbers are labeled at the sides of the chart.

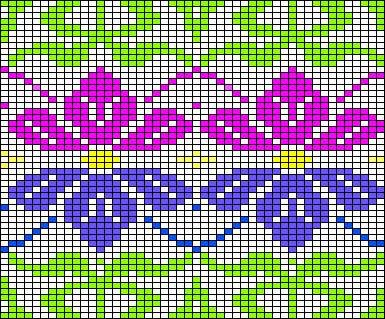
A knitting pattern chart with colorwork.

Chart patterns use a matrix of blocks filled with letters and symbols to describe the knitted stitches, typically with one stitch per block. The same symbol can have a different meaning depending on whether the stitch is worked on the right side or wrong side of the knitted fabric. When knitting flat, typically odd-numbered rows are considered the right side of the fabric and even-numbered rows are considered the wrong side of the fabric unless the knitting pattern denotes otherwise. When knitting in the round, all rows are considered the right side of the fabric.

Chart patterns provide visual feedback on the relative position of stitches. They may be color-coded for multi-color knitting.

==== List of typical chart symbols ====
Below is a list of typical symbols used in a knitting pattern chart.

Symbol	Meaning (RS)	Meaning (WS)	Notes
	Knit	Purl	
	Purl	Knit	A small dot symbol instead of a dash symbol may be used instead
	Yarn over	Yarn over	
	k2tog	p2tog	Creates a right-leaning decrease
	ssk	ssp	Creates a left-leaning decrease

== Sources ==
The earliest known pattern book containing a knitting pattern was published in 1524. The earliest published English knitting pattern appeared in Natura Exenterata: or Nature Unbowelled, which was printed in London in 1655. Knitting books started to become more widespread in the 1800s; Jane Gaugain was an early influential author of knitting pattern books in the early 1800s.

Individual knitting patterns, sold as leaflets, date to early 1900s.

Yarn companies give away knitting patterns to promote use of their yarn.

== Gallery ==
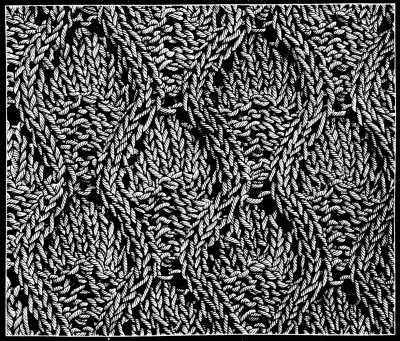

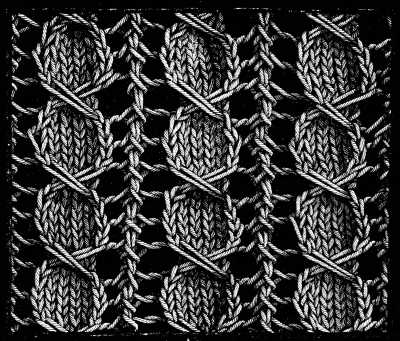

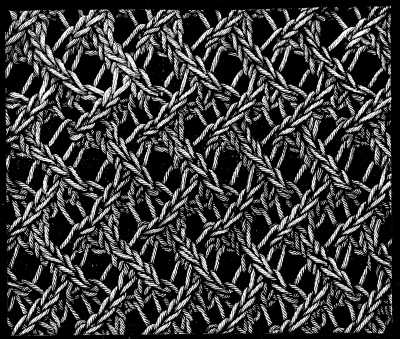

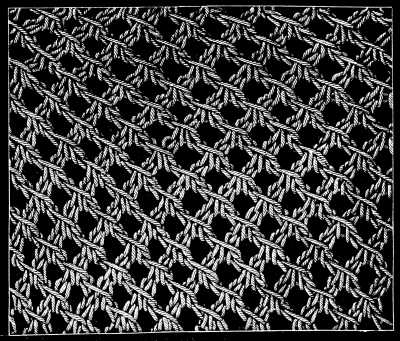

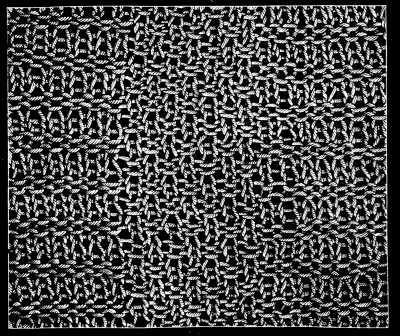

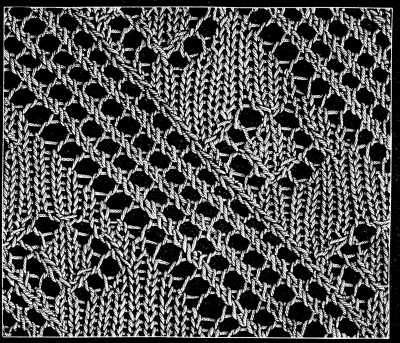

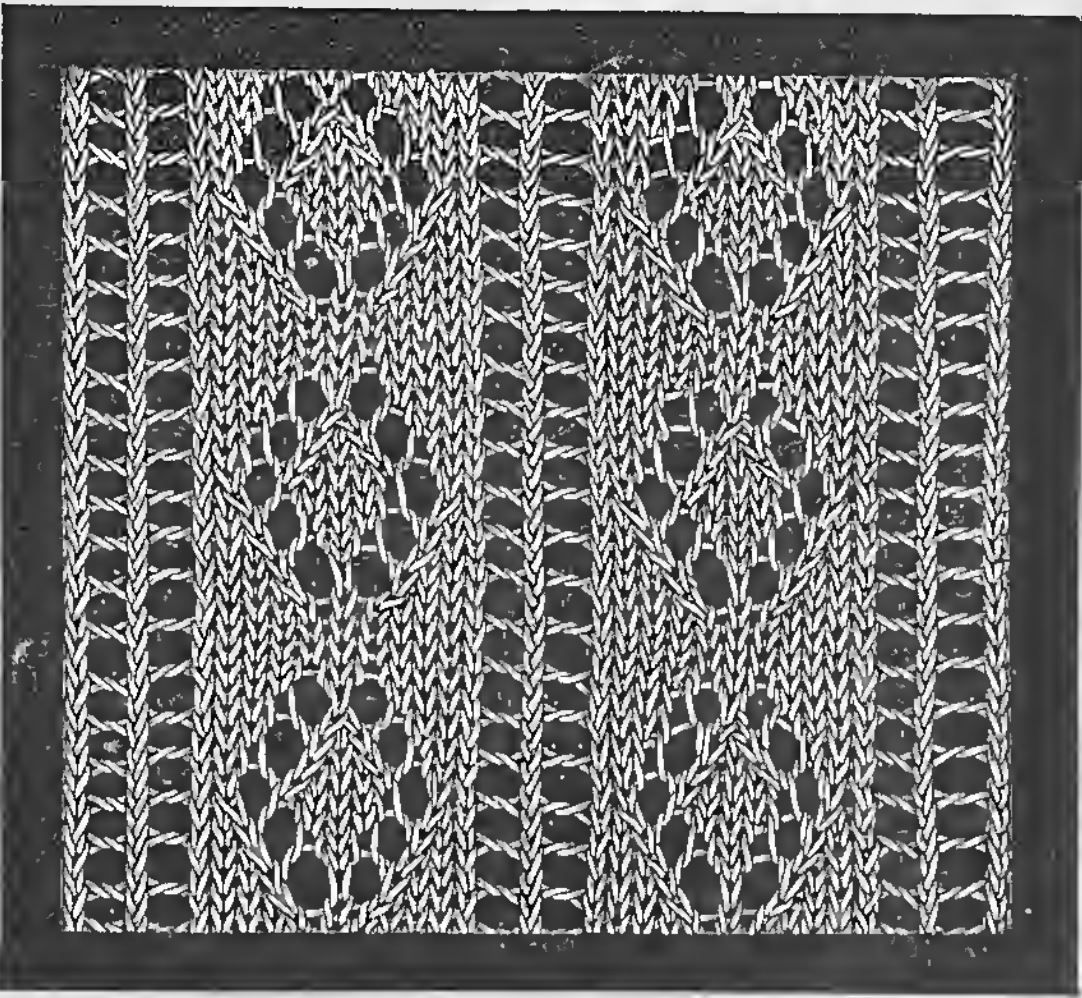

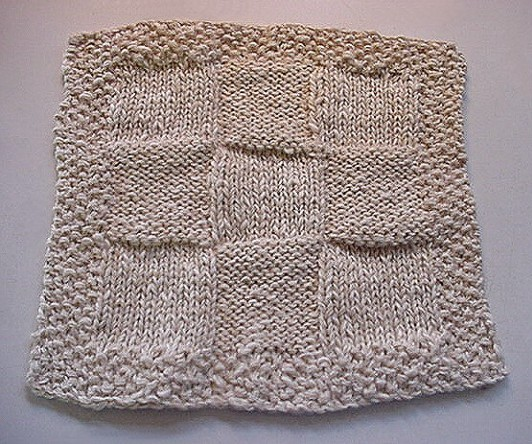

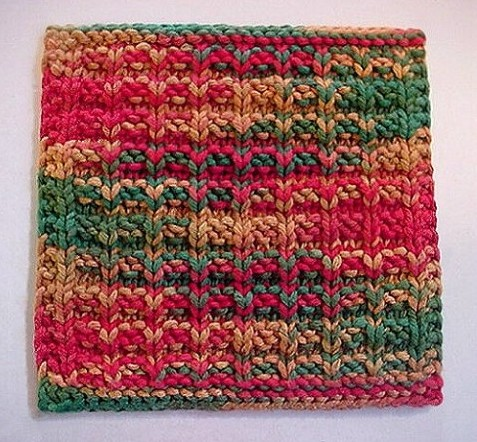

== See also ==
- Freeform crochet and knitting, to make a piece that is not constrained by patterns
- List of knitting stitches
