= Yarn over =

Knitting technique in which the yarn is passed over the right-hand knitting needle

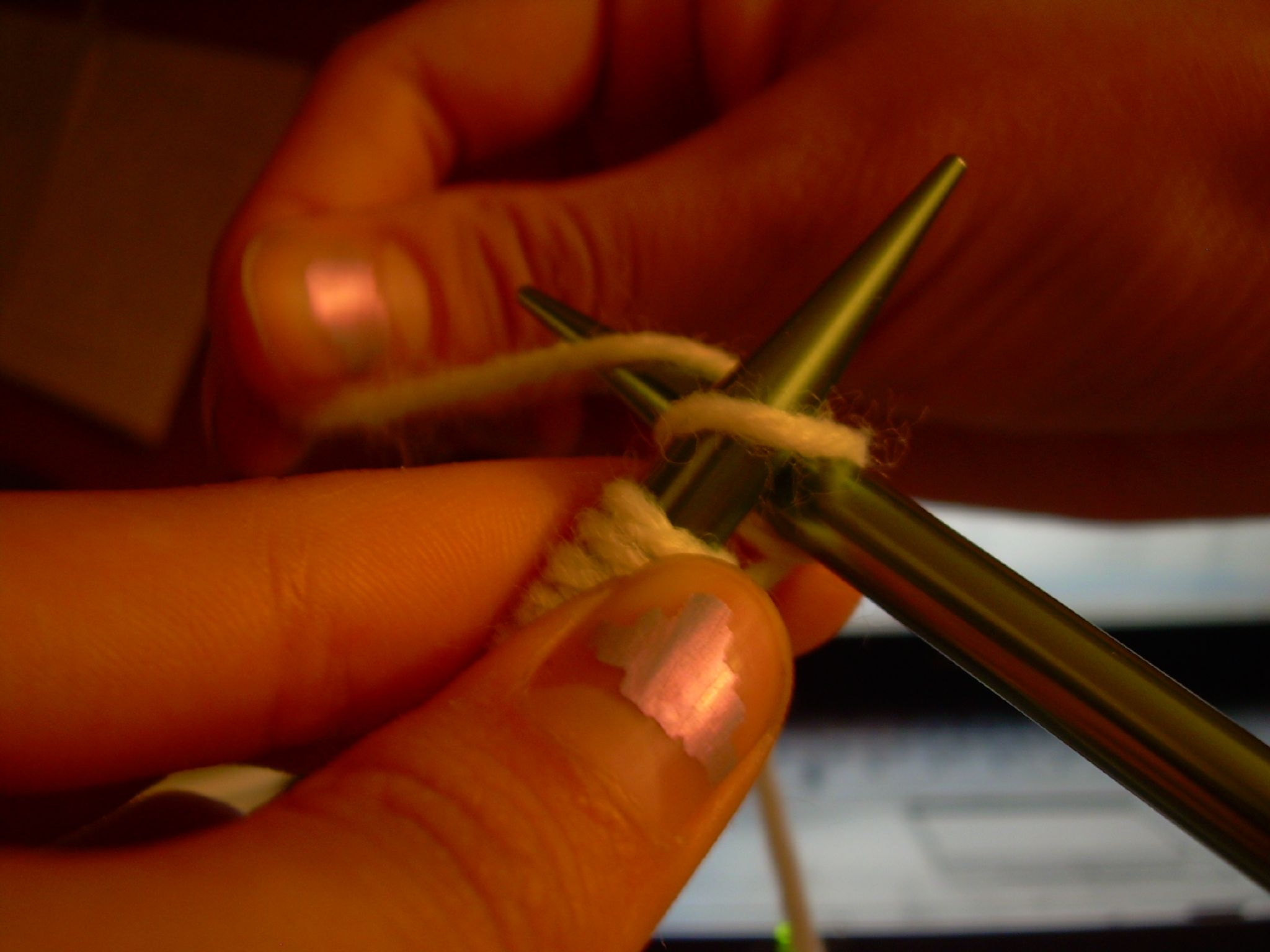
Yarn over example

In knitting, a yarn over is technique in which the yarn is passed over the right-hand knitting needle. In general, the new loop is knitted on the next row, either by itself (producing a hole) or together with an adjacent stitch (e.g., in "tucked" slip stitches). The yarn-over may also be dropped on the next row, producing a longer stretch of yarn between the stitches of the previous row. Conversely, the effect of a yarn-over can be obtained by picking up the yarn between stitches of the previous row; the difference is that the yarn then is shorter, and the flanking stitches of the previous row may be overly drawn together.

The term "yarn-over" refers only to the act of wrapping the yarn around the needle, and not to the working of the next existing stitch. Yarn-overs are often used to increase the number of stitches, since knitting a yarn-over creates a new stitch where none existed previously, but does not use up a stitch on the needle. Yarn-overs are also common in eyelet and lace knitting, since they produce stable holes in the fabric.

Yarn-overs are also used to slip stitches neatly without having to pass the yarn in front or back. Instead, a yarn-over is done adjacent to the slipped stitch, and the two are knit together on the following row. Thus, the yarn is "tucked away" by passing over the slipped stitch, rather than in front or back. This is the basis for brioche knitting.

There are several types of yarn-over, depending on how many times the yarn is wrapped around the knitting needle and on the direction (chirality) with which the yarn is wrapped. Normally, the yarn is wrapped with a right-handed chirality, i.e., counterclockwise when looking at the right-hand needle point-on. Wrapping the yarn the other way (i.e., left-handedly) will result in a plaited stitch if the stitch is knit on the following row.

Wrapping the yarn multiple times produces a very long loop, which can yield interesting visual effects. For example, a row of such long stitches makes an interesting horizontal stripe. Alternatively, the knitting of the long loop can be deferred until a later row (e.g., 5 rows later); in this case, the loop need not be knit vertically, but can be knit diagonally, e.g., to form the lower leaves of a flower.
