= Twisted stitch =

In knitting, a twisted stitch, also known as a plaited stitch, is a single knitted stitch that is twisted clockwise (right over left) or counterclockwise (left over right), usually by one half-turn (180°) but sometimes by a full turn (360°) or more.

== Methods ==
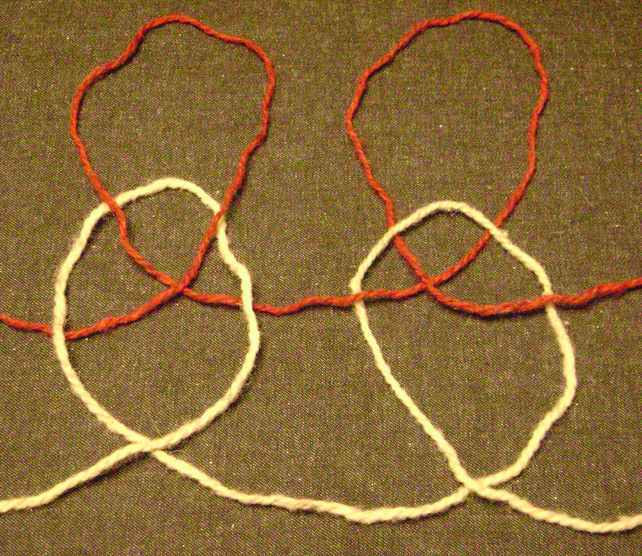
Large-scale illustration of plaited stitches in knitting

Twisted stitches can be produced in several ways. Knitting into the back loop produces a clockwise plaited stitch in the lower stitch being knitted (i.e., the loop that was on the left-hand needle.) The clockwise-plaited stitch is also called a left crossed stitch, since the left strand (i.e., the outgoing strand) of the loop crosses over the right incoming strand. Left-crossed stitches are sometimes called twisted stitches, although the latter term might be confused with similar terms from cable knitting. Conversely, a counterclockwise plaited stitch can be produced if the yarn is wrapped around the needle in the opposite direction as normal while knitting a stitch. Such a stitch is also called a "right crossed stitch", since the right incoming strand crosses over the left outgoing strand. Here, the plait appears in the upper stitch being knitted, i.e., in the new loop being formed. In the "brute-force" approach, the knitter can produce any sort of plaiting by removing the stitch to be knitted from the left-hand needle, twisting it as desired, then returning it to the left-hand needle and knitting it.

== Applications in knitting ==
Both clockwise and counterclockwise plaited stitches are often repeated in wales, i.e., in columns of knitting, where they make attractive, subtly different ribbings. Fabrics made with plaited stitches are stiffer than normal and "draw in" sideways, i.e., have a smaller widthwise gauge.

Extra-long, full-turn clockwise plaited stitches can be made by knitting through the back loop and wrapping the yarn twice; this is an attractive stitch when repeated in a row, creating openness and a change in scale that enlivens even simple stockinette or garter stitch.

Plaited stitches are also useful in increases and decreases, both for drawing the fabric together and for covering potential "holes" in the fabric. The SSK (slip, slip, knit) decrease is one such example and looks markedly better than the much simpler k2tog tbl.

== As a method for correcting errors ==
As an aside, knitting through the back loop is a useful technique for untwisting stitches on the left-hand needle that "hang backwards". Such stitches are often produced when a knitted fabric is partially pulled out and some stitches are accidentally put back onto the needle with a backward twist, or when picking up stitches with a crochet hook (e.g. the gusset of socks) and slipping them on the needle twisted.
