= Binding off =

Knitting technique

In knitting, binding off, or casting off, is a family of techniques for ending a column (a wale) of stitches. Binding off is typically used to define the final (usually upper, taking the cast on edge as the lower) edge of a knitted fabric, although it may also be used in other contexts, e.g., in making button holes. In principle, binding off is the opposite of casting on, but the techniques are generally not mirror images of one another. Sometimes, however, they can produce a mirror image appearance.

== Techniques ==
Binding/casting off generally involves passing the final loop of a wale over the loop of an adjacent stitch. Techniques differ, however, in how this is done:

Simple bind/cast off
Involves simply passing each loop over an adjacent stitch. (The yarn is passed through the final loop to secure the whole chain.) This technique produces a tight edge with little elasticity. Its advantages are that

1. it does not flare as many bound/cast-off edges do;
2. it will retain its length, even under tension (good for shoulder seams);
3. it does not require that the knitting yarn be nearby;
4. it can be done in any direction.

Knit bind/cast off
Involves knitting each loop before passing it over the next loop. The start is made by knitting two stitches as normal, then pulling the first knitted stitch on the right needle over the second knitted stitch on the right needle, knitting the next stitch on the left needle, and continuing to the end. This can be done tightly or loosely, depending on the tension of the knitter. To ensure that the bind/cast-off edge is loose, one method is to use a needle at least two sizes larger than the project needle size.

Purl bind/cast off
Involves purling each loop before passing it over the next loop. This is simply the purl version of the knit bind/cast off. This can also be in patterns, such as a rib pattern.

Decrease bind/cast off
Involves iterative decreases, e.g., "k2tog, return loop to left needle".

Sewn bind/cast off
This involves the use of a tapestry needle with an extremely long tail of the yarn. Using this long tail, pull the needle through two front loops as if to purl, then back through the first stitch as if to knit. Drop the first stitch off. Repeat to the end. There are several variations, but this is the most well-known.

Three needle bind/cast off
This bind/cast off is used for joining two pieces of knitting, such as the front and back of a sweater by binding/casting off their stitches together to create a seam. For this bind/cast off, the two needles (in the case of a sweater, each may hold the shoulder stitches) are held parallel with the right sides of the knitting facing each other. Binding/casting off as with the knit bind/cast off, each stitch is the result of knitting together one stitch from each needle (i.e. pass needle through first stitch of first needle, first stitch of second needle, wrap yarn, pull through, and drop both stitches)

Tubular bind/cast off
A stretchy bind/cast off used on a ribbed edge; most helpful for sock and neckline edges.

Yarn-over bind/cast off
A simple method used to create a stretchy bind/cast-off edge on various stitch patterns, including all types of ribbing. It is particularly well-suited for finishing toe-up socks, cuffs, and necklines. The edge is formed by making a regular yarn over before purling a stitch and a reverse yarn over before knitting a stitch. After each stitch is purled or knitted, both the yarn over and the preceding stitch are passed over the newest stitch on the right-hand needle and off the needles.
