= Basketweave (knitting) =

Knitting technique

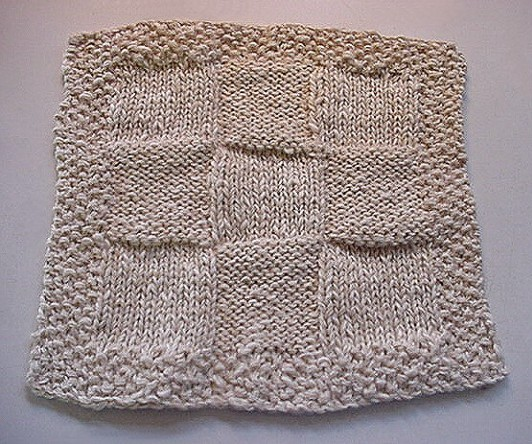
Knitting basketweave stitch (unblocked)

In knitting, a basketweave pattern is characterized by intersecting ribs and welts.

In its simplest form, basketweave is composed of a checkerboard pattern of identical rectangles that alternate between stockinette stitch and reverse stockinette stitch. In this form of basketweave, the only variables are the dimensions of the rectangles, i.e., the number of stitches across and number of rows long. If the rectangles are much longer vertically than horizontally, a basketweave may also be called a broken rib pattern. Similarly, if the rectangles are much longer horizontally than vertically, a basketweave may also be called a broken welt pattern. More complicated types of basketweave can be made with allowing the rib and welt widths to vary (i.e., by using rectangles of different sizes), and by allowing some rows or welts to continue uninterrupted.

Other variations of basketweave change the stitch patterns that compose the rectangles. Instead of stockinette stitch and its reverse, the rectangles can be done in seed stitch, in cables or lace. An especially common variant is to alternate rectangles of ribbing with rectangles of welting, e.g., rectangles of three ribs set against rectangles of three welts.

A visually fascinating alternative approach to basketweave patterns is entrelac knitting, in which the grain of the knitted fabric itself follows a woven pattern.
