= Loop knitting =

In loop knitting, long, dangling loops are introduced into the middle of a knitted fabric or along an edge (fringe border). The loops may appear singly or in large clusters. An overall array of such loops may be used to give a "shaggy" look to the fabric and/or make it warmer, e.g., tufting the inside of mittens. After they're made, the loops may be cut or left intact; two adjacent loops tied together in a bow-knot is an attractive pattern as well.

== Techniques ==
A fringe border can be made by dropping stitches along the border from the top to bottom of the knitted fabric. This is the same as producing a vertical stripe in drop-stitch knitting.

A common method for producing one or more loops is as follows. The yarn is formed into the desired number of loops with the desired length. These loop(s) are held behind the work, drawn through the desired stitch using the right-hand needle and placed on the left-hand needle next to the desired stitch. The loops and the desired stitch are knit together to secure the loops.

Another method for producing a dangling loop is to knit twice into the same stitch, leaving a long loop in between; the two stitches are knit together to secure the loop.

this is very common in the name of the weft and warp
