= Rahul Jain =

Indian textile designer

- Born: 1963 (age 61–62); Delhi, India
- Occupation(s): Textile designer, art historian, author
- Awards: Padma Shri (2015); Shortlisted for Jameel Prize III

Rahul Jain is an Indian textile designer, art historian, and author. Born in Delhi in 1963, he founded ASHA, a textile workshop engaged in promoting the traditional Indo-Iranian weaving techniques in Varanasi in 1993 and is reportedly contributing to the revival of the dying art form of silk weaving on traditional Indian drawlooms. He employs silver and gold threads on pure Indian, Iranian, and Turkish silk and his motifs are known to be Mughal, Safavid and Ottoman inspired.

Jain has authored a book on textile art, Rapture - The Art of Indian Textiles, which describes the history of Indian textile art for 500 years. He has also published two more books, Mughal Patkas Ashavali Saria and Indo-Ground Fragments in the Collections of the Calico Museum of Textiles and the Sarabhai Foundation, a book on the historical techniques used in textile weaving and Handcrafted Indian Textiles: Tradition and Beyond, a book on design, techniques and aesthetics.

Jain was shortlisted for the Jameel Prize III, an international award for contemporary Islamic art. He was honoured by the Government of India in 2015 with Padma Shri, the fourth highest Indian civilian award.

== See also ==
- Mughal art
- Safavid art
