= Drop-stitch knitting =

Knitting technique

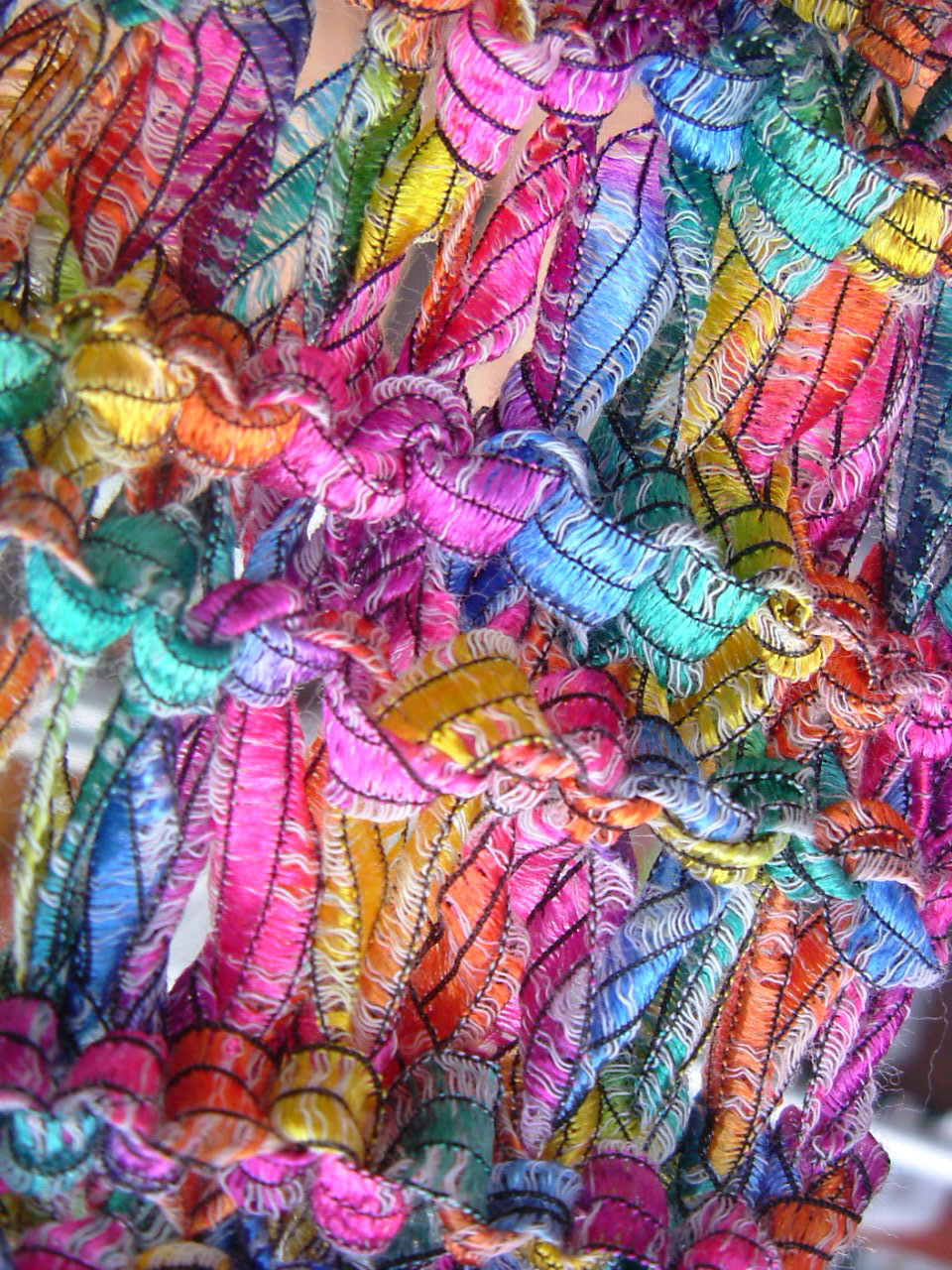
Close-up view of a hand-knitted drop stitch scarf.

Drop-stitch knitting is a knitting technique for producing open, vertical stripes in a garment. The basic idea is to knit a solid fabric, then (deliberately) drop one or more stitches (i.e., draw a loop out from the loop below it, and so on repeatedly), producing a run (or ladder) in the fabric. The run will continue to the bottom (i.e., cast-on) edge of the garment, or until it encounters an increase, at which it stops.

Drop-stitch runs are an easy way to get the "see-through" effect of lace, but with a much more casual look. The designer can make interesting arrangements of open stripes (of whatever length); the endpoints of the stripe are specified by the initial increase and the point at which the first stitch was dropped. Drop-stitch stripes are usually vertical, since they follow the grain of the knitting, i.e., the wales, the columns of dependent loops. However, the grain of the knitting can be made off-vertical, e.g., in entrelac or by increasing on one edge and decreasing on the other. A drop-stitch that does not produce a vertical stripe (or a run) occurs when the initial increase happens in the middle of a stitch (wrap the yarn over the right needle multiple times during the stitch which should produce what looks to be multiple yarn-overs on the right needle) and the increase is then dropped instead of worked in the next row. This produces a stitch that is twice as long as a normal stitch. This method will produce a horizontal stripe when it is used on multiple adjacent stitches. When the number of increases applied to a single stitch is raised the resulting stitch is proportionately lengthened.

Instead of being left open, the cross-strands of runs (the "rungs" of the ladder) can also be modified in various ways. For example, using a crochet hook, one can re-work them into larger knitted bights, e.g., by drawing four strands through the four below them, and so on indefinitely. As another example, the "rungs" can be bound up in different patterns using a contrasting yarn and a darning needle.
