= Finger knitting =

Form of knitting using the fingers

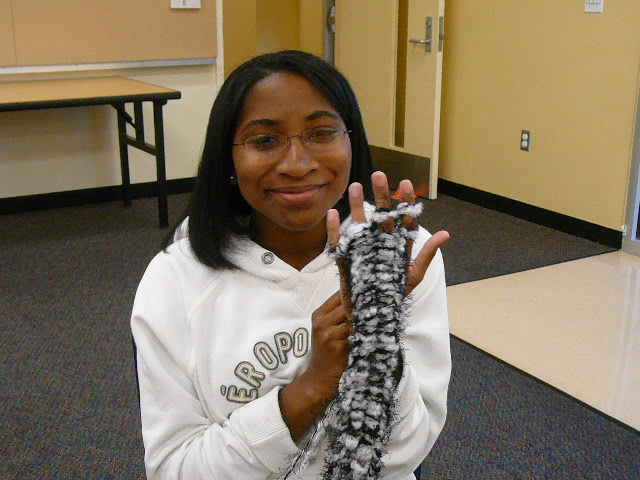
Scarf finger knitted

Finger knitting is a form of knitting where a knitted cord is created using only hands and fingers, instead of knitting needles or other traditional tools.

== Uses ==
Though finger knitting may be performed by people of all ages, it is cited as a teaching tool for children because of its comparative simplicity in contrast to traditional knitting. It effectively demonstrates that knitting involves a series of loops strung together. Finger knitting may also be safely practiced on airplanes that prohibit knitting needles.

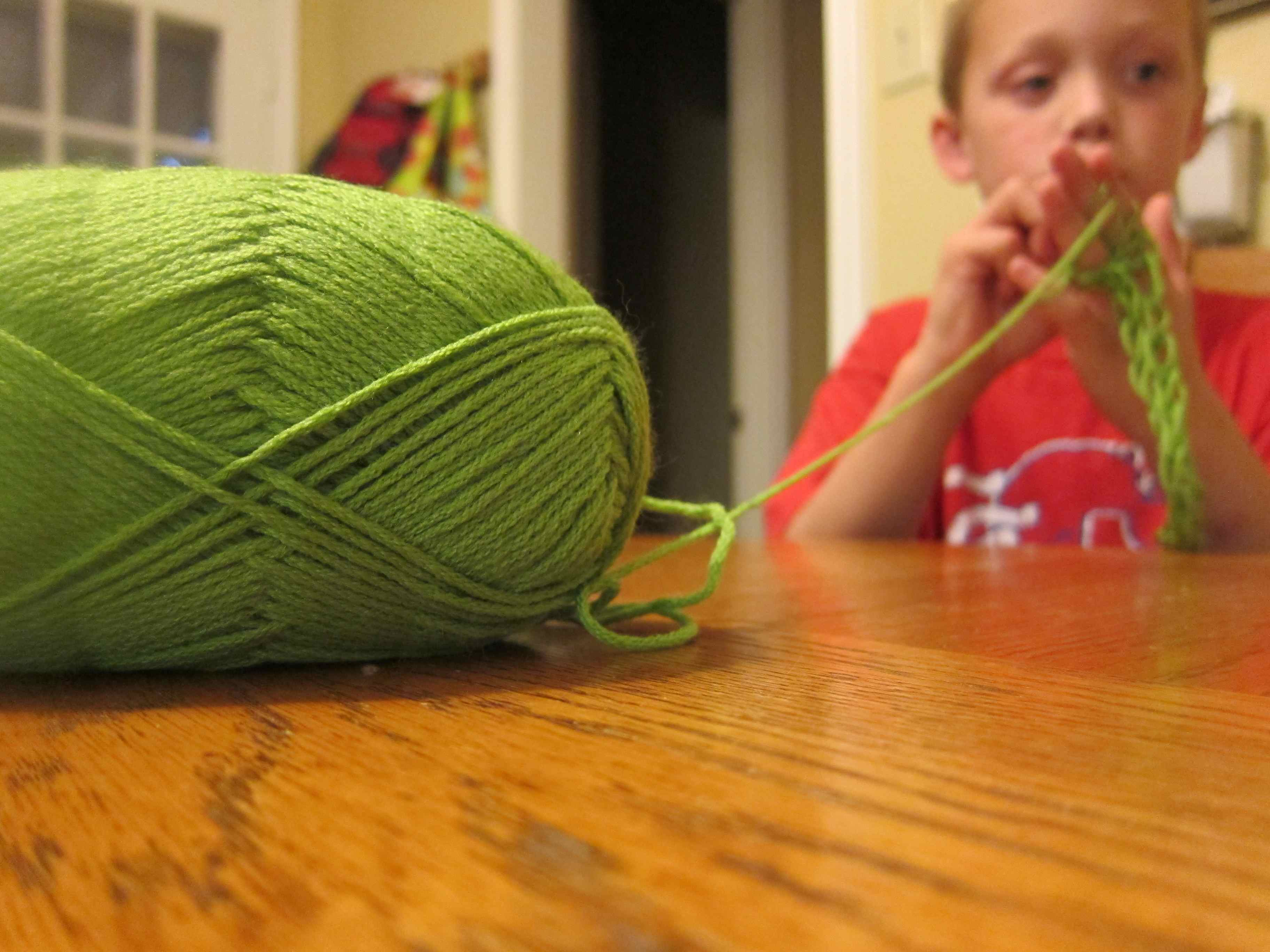
Child finger knitting

== Records ==
Several world record attempts have been made with finger knitting. The current record, as acknowledged by the Guinness Book of World Records, is held by a German man who knitted a 4,321-metre (14,177 ft) strand in 2004. Ten days before the German record was set, 11-year-old Gemma Pouls of Hamilton, New Zealand, set the record with a 2,779.49-metre (9,119.1 ft), which weighed over 5 kg (11 lb).
