= Knitting =

Method of forming fabric

Person knitting

Video description of knitting a sock and the two basic stitches: knit and purl

Knitting is the process of interlooping a continuous length of yarn to create textile fabric made of rows of interconnected loops. Knitting can be done by hand, by machine or using one of a variety of frames developed for the purpose. When done by hand, one uses a pair of knitting needles where the loops are created one at a time. When done by machine the loops are created on hooks that work one entire row of knitting at a time.

Hand knitting needles are either straight with blunt ends or so-called "circular needles" that are a single flexible tube or wire with blunt needles at both ends. The resulting knitted fabric consists rows of loops that intermesh with the rows above and below.

Differences in yarn (varying in fiber type, yarn weight, color, uniformity, twist per inch), in needle size, and in stitch type allow for a variety of knitted fabrics with different properties, including texture, thickness, heat retention, and water resistance. A small sample of knitwork is known as a "swatch" and helps the maker determine the gauge of the intended work.

== Overview ==
=== Etymology of the words knit and knitting ===
There are several possible origins of the word knit and knitting. These include the German derivation from the word knutten (to tie), the Old Norse word knytja, and the Old English words cnyttan (to tie a knot, bind together, fasten by tieing) and cnotta (knot).

=== History and culture ===
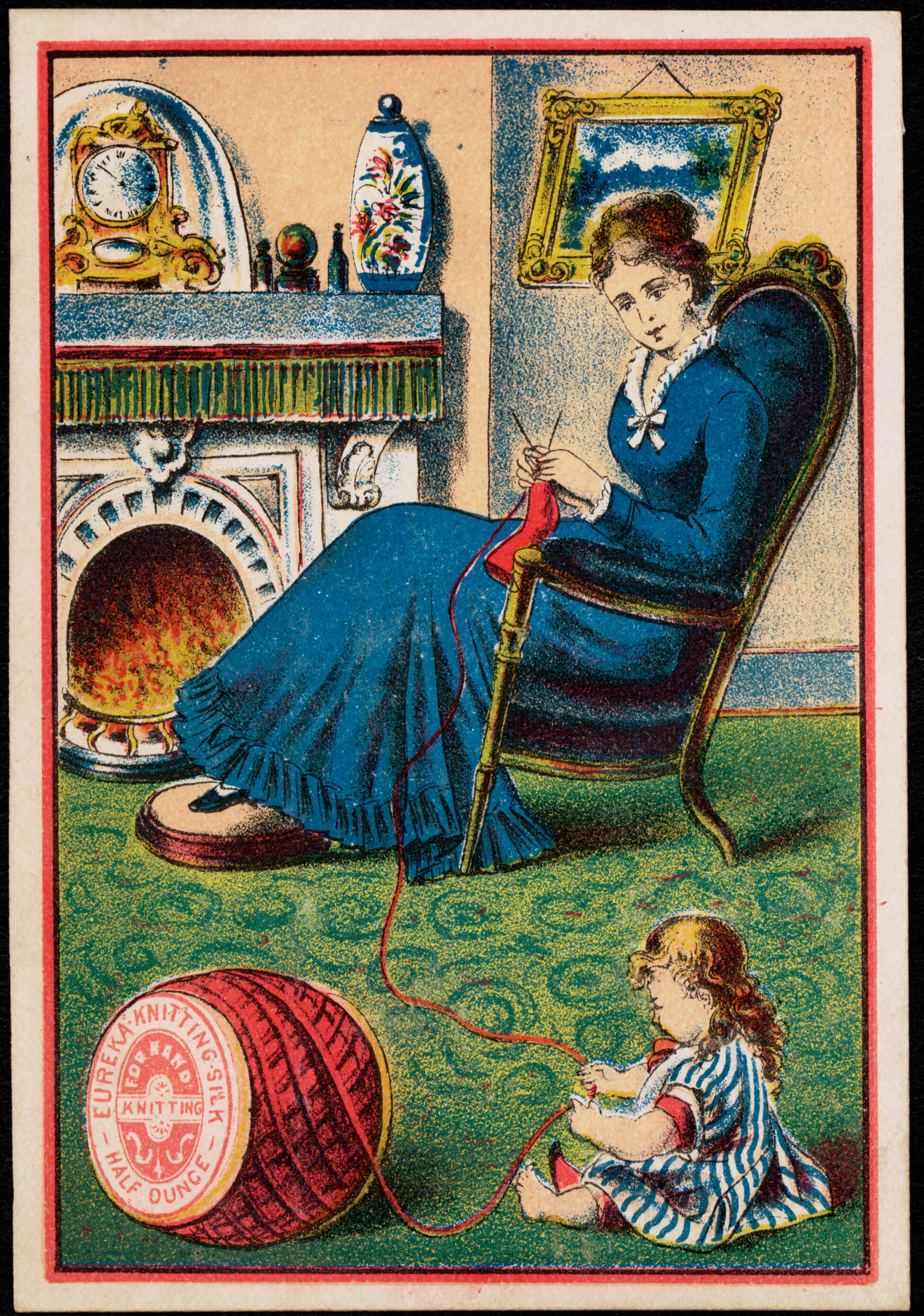
Eureka Knitting Silk for hand knitting, half ounce, c. 1870–1900; from the 19th Century American Trade Cards collection of the Boston Public Library

Artifacts of fabric making using some form of knitting have been found in many regions including Egypt, China, Denmark, and Sweden, dating as far back as 4200 BCE. The exact origins of the invention of knitting are unknown, however the earliest known examples are cotton socks dating from the 11th century, found in the remains of the city of Fustat, now part of Cairo. In Europe, knitting is believed to be an evolution of the ancient craft of nålebinding, the Scandinavian word for "needle binding". In nålebinding, fabric is created through forming loops and knots of yarn with a single needle.

The first commercial knitting guilds appeared in Western Europe in the early fifteenth century (Tournai in 1429, Barcelona in 1496). The Guild of Saint Fiacre was founded in Paris in 1527, but the archives mention an organization (not necessarily a guild) of knitters from 1268. The occupation "cap knitter" was recorded in 1473 as these textile artists primarily produced knit caps and dyed stockings.

In 1589, William Lee of Nottinghamshire invented the first stocking frame, which was an early form of the knitting machine. Lee petitioned Queen Elizabeth I for a patent but was denied due to the coarse nature of the frame-knit fabric and the fear that frame knitting would take away the jobs of hand knitters in England. Lee improved the knitting frame to accommodate a finer gauge, or number of stitches per inch, producing a smoother fabric, but his petition for a patent failed following the death of his court sponsor and apprentice, Lord Hunsdon, in 1596. Lee travelled to Normandy, France, and later Paris, along with a group of apprentices in search of court sponsorship for his invention. After further trials and tribulations due to the assassination of King Henry IV in 1610, Lee was unable to establish a successful business in Paris. William Lee died in Paris in 1614, and his brother James Lee along with William's apprentice, Aston, adopted the petition to patent the knitting machine in England. By 1620, frame knitting was an established mode of production of knitted garments.

With the invention of the stocking frame, knitting "by hand" became a craft used by country people with easy access to fiber. Similar to quilting, spinning, and needlepoint, hand knitting became a leisure activity for the wealthy.

=== Differences and similarities between knitting and crocheting ===
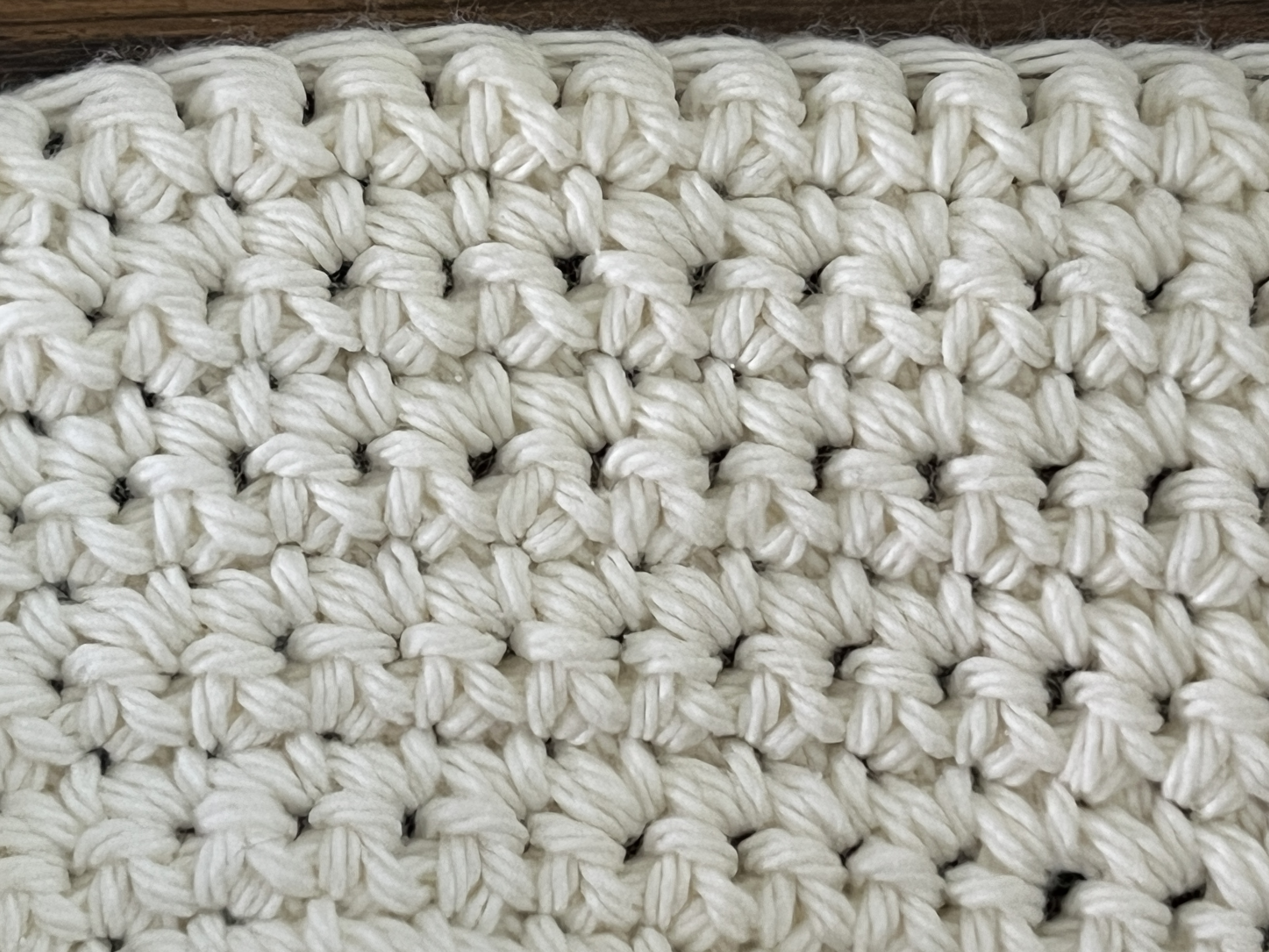
A swatch of crocheted fabric. Each stitch is formed by pulling multiple loops through each other.

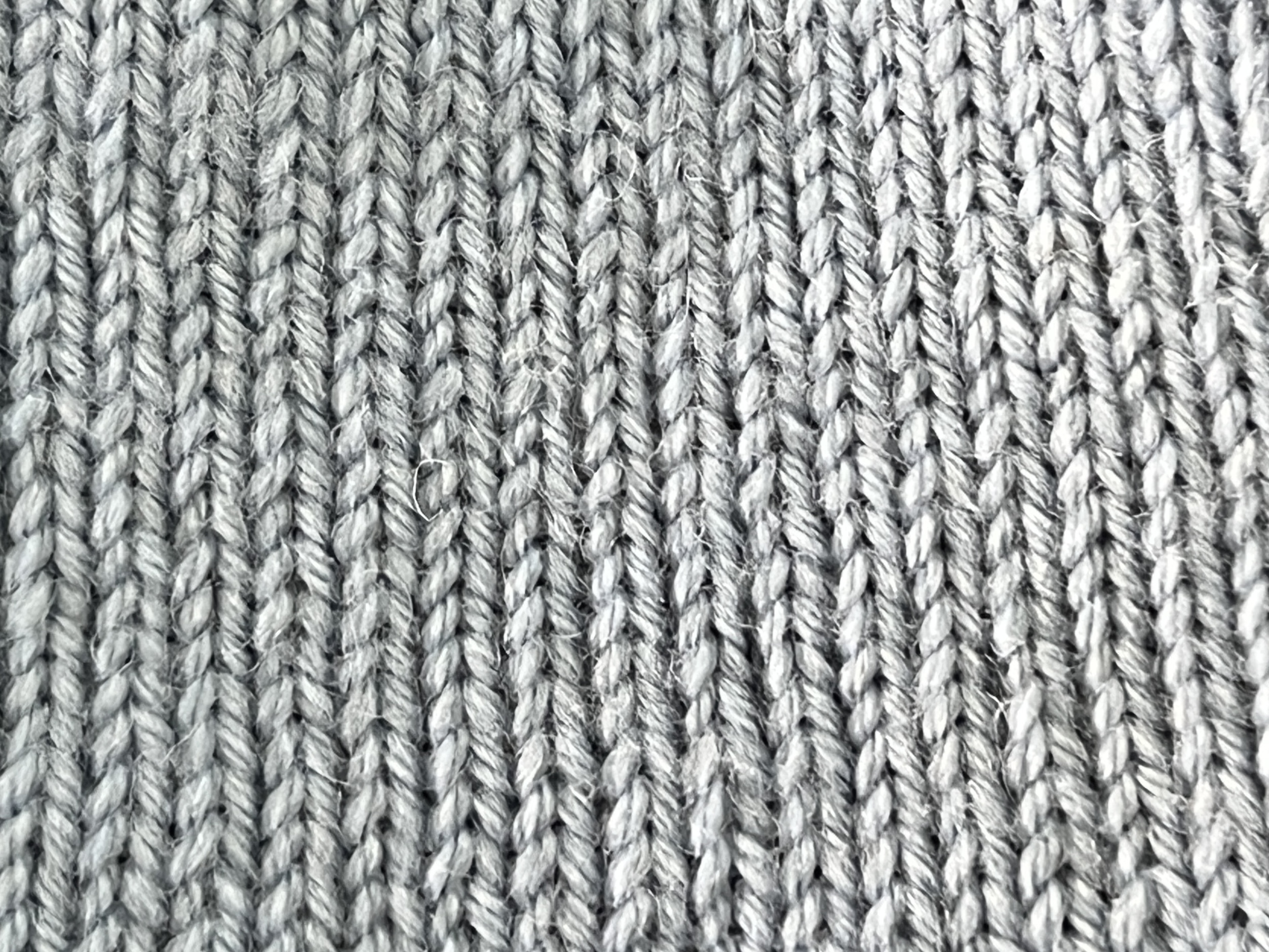
A swatch of knitted fabric. Each stitch is formed by pulling up a single loop through the previous stitch.

When knitting by hand, two or more needles are used to hold the live stitches and they are knit from one needle over to the next needle. By contrast, crochet uses a single hook, usually finishing one stitch before creating the next. The stitches in knitted fabric form a shape that is similar to a "V", whereas the stitches in crochet look more like knots. Knitted fabric also tends to be thinner and more flexible, making it more drapey. Because of the different nature of each stitch, crochet fabric uses more yarn per stitch, holds structure better, and can have more variety of stitches, since the crochet hook usually only holds one live stitch. Since knitting requires all the needed stitches to sit on the needles at the same time, knitting requires more planning ahead of time. Although different methods, they can create similar projects using the same fibers and yarns.

== Fabric structure ==
=== Courses and wales ===
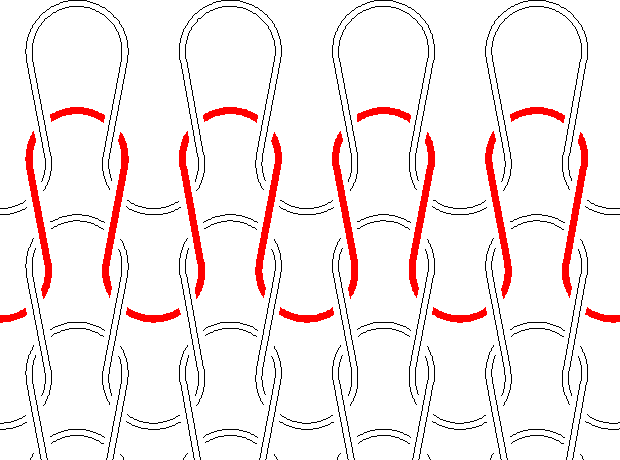
Structure of stockinette stitch, a common weave in knitted fabric. The meandering red path defines one course, the path of the yarn through the fabric. The uppermost white loops are unsecured and "active", but they secure the red loops suspended from them. In turn, the red loops secure the white loops just below them, which in turn secure the loops below them, and so on.

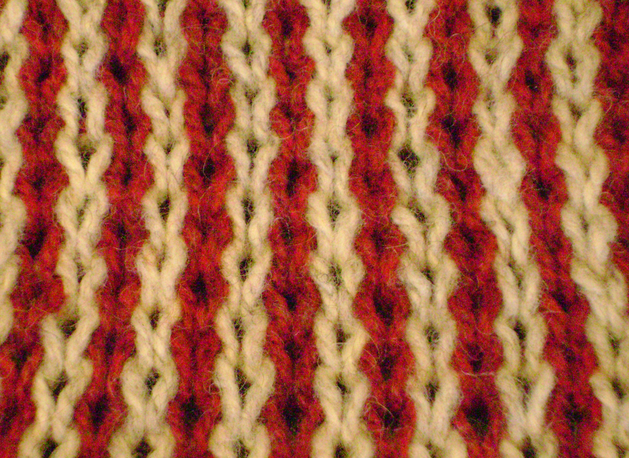
Alternating wales of red and yellow knit stitches. Each stitch in a wale is suspended from the one above it.

Like weaving, knitting is a technique for producing a two-dimensional fabric made from a one-dimensional yarn or thread. In weaving, threads are usually straight, running parallel either lengthwise (warp threads) or crosswise (weft threads). By contrast, the yarn in knitted fabrics follows a meandering path (a course or a row), forming symmetric loops (also called bights or stitches) symmetrically above and below the mean path of the yarn. These meandering loops can be easily stretched in different directions giving knit fabrics much more elasticity than woven fabrics. To secure a stitch, at least one new loop is passed through it. Although the new stitch is itself unsecured ("active" or "live"), it secures the stitch(es) suspended from it. A sequence of stitches in which each stitch is suspended from the next is called a wale. A wale, according to Knitting Technology: a Comprehensive Handbook and Practical Guide, is "a predominantly vertical column of needle loops generally produced by the same needles at successive (not necessarily all) knitting cycles. A wale starts as soon as an empty needle starts to knit"

To secure the initial stitches of a knitted fabric, a method for casting on is used; to secure the final stitches in a wale, one uses a method of binding/casting off. During knitting, the active stitches are secured mechanically, either from individual hooks (in knitting machines) or from a knitting needle or frame in hand-knitting.

Depending on the yarn and knitting pattern, knitted garments can stretch as much as 500%. For this reason, knitting was initially developed for garments that must be elastic or stretch in response to the wearer's motions, such as socks and hosiery. For comparison, woven garments stretch mainly along one or other of a related pair of directions that lie roughly diagonally between the warp and the weft, while contracting in the other direction of the pair (stretching and contracting with the bias), and are not very elastic, unless they are woven from stretchable material such as spandex. Knitted garments are often more form-fitting than woven garments, since their elasticity allows them to contour to the body's outline more closely; by contrast, curvature is introduced into most woven garments only with sewn darts, flares, gussets and gores, the seams of which lower the elasticity of the woven fabric still further. Extra curvature can be introduced into knitted garments without seams, as in the heel of a sock; the effect of darts, flares, etc. can be obtained with short rows or by increasing or decreasing the number of stitches. Thread used in weaving is usually much finer than the yarn used in knitting, which can give the knitted fabric more bulk and less drape than a woven fabric.

If they are not secured, the loops of a knitted course will come undone when their yarn is pulled; this is known as ripping out, unravelling knitting, or humorously, frogging (because the knitter will 'rip it', this sounds like a frog croaking: 'rib-bit').

=== Weft and warp knitting ===
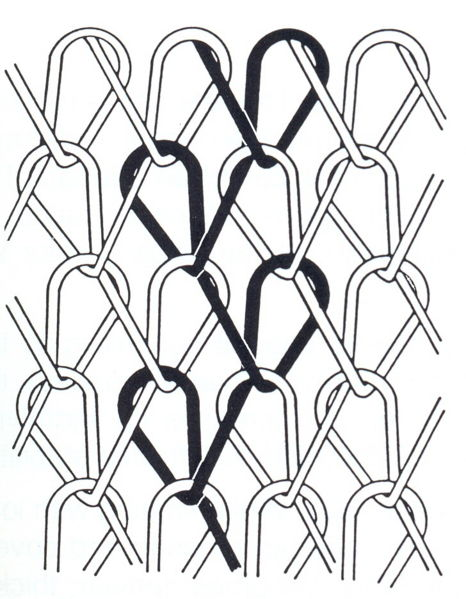
Basic pattern of warp knitting. Parallel yarns zigzag lengthwise along the fabric, each loop securing a loop of an adjacent strand from the previous row.

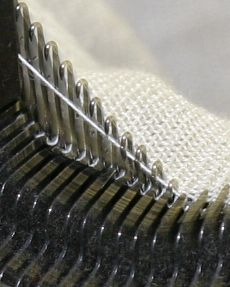
A modern knitting machine in the process of weft knitting

There are two major varieties of knitting: weft knitting and warp knitting. In the more common weft knitting, the wales are perpendicular to the course of the yarn. In warp knitting, the wales and courses run roughly parallel. In weft knitting, the entire fabric may be produced from a single yarn, by adding stitches to each wale in turn, moving across the fabric as in a raster scan. By contrast, in warp knitting, one yarn is required for every wale. Since a typical piece of knitted fabric may have hundreds of wales, warp knitting is typically done by machine, whereas weft knitting is done by both hand and machine. Warp-knitted fabrics such as tricot and milanese are resistant to runs, and are commonly used in lingerie.

Weft-knit fabrics may also be knit with multiple yarns, usually to produce interesting color patterns. The two most common approaches are intarsia and stranded colorwork. In intarsia, the yarns are used in well-segregated regions, e.g., a red apple on a field of green; in that case, the yarns are kept on separate spools and only one is knitted at any time. In the more complex stranded approach, two or more yarns alternate repeatedly within one row and all the yarns must be carried along the row, as seen in Fair Isle sweaters. Double knitting can produce two separate knitted fabrics simultaneously (e.g., two socks). However, the two fabrics are usually integrated into one, giving it great warmth and excellent drape.

=== Knit and purl stitches ===
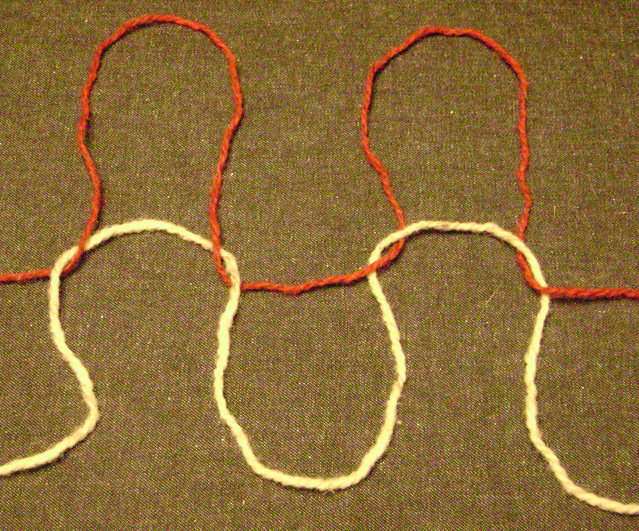
In the knit stitch on the left, the next (red) loop passes through the previous (yellow) loop from below, whereas in the purl stitch (right), the next stitch enters from above. Thus, a knit stitch on one side of the fabric appears as a purl stitch on the other, and vice versa.

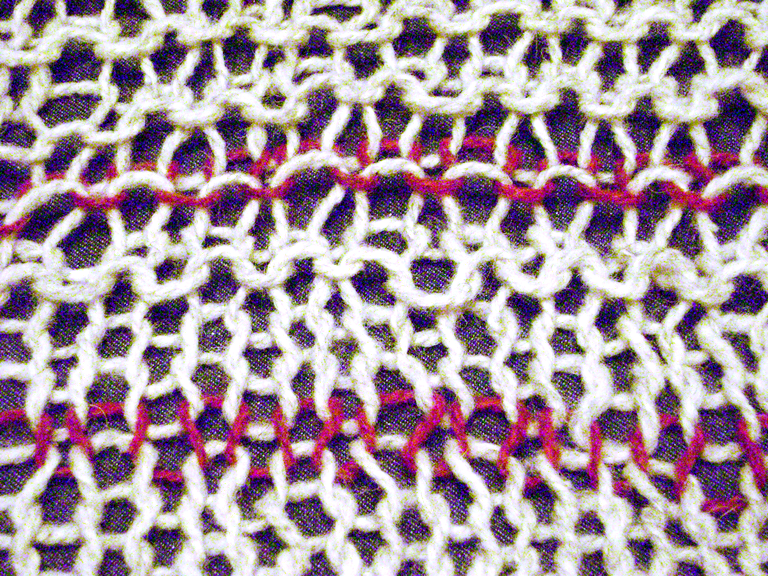
Two courses of red yarn illustrating two basic fabric types. The lower red course is knit into the white row below it and is itself knit on the next row; this produces 'stockinette' stitch. The upper red course is purled into the row below and then is knit, consistent with 'garter' stitch.

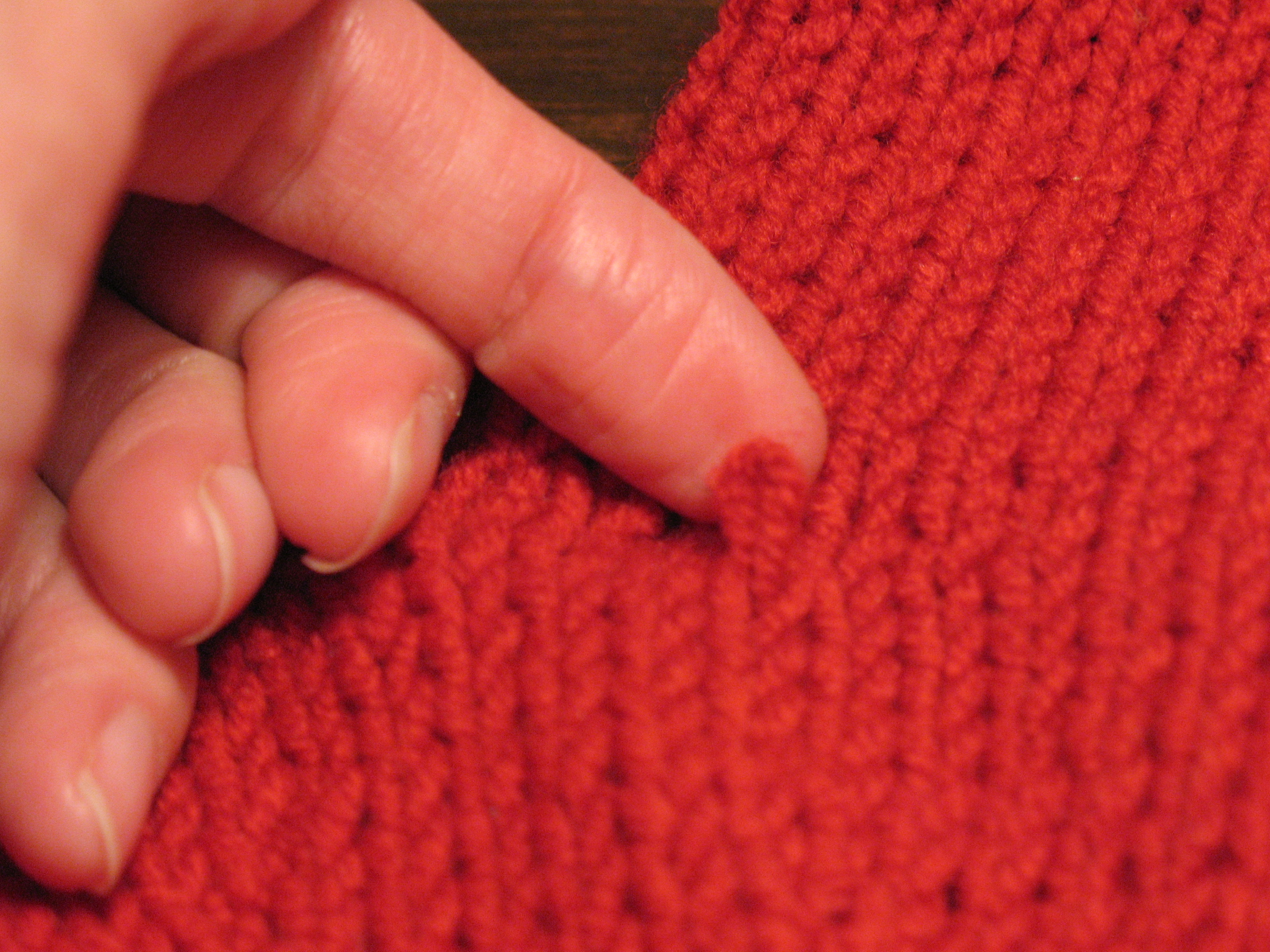
A dropped stitch, or missed stitch, is a common error that creates an extra loop to be fixed.

In securing the previous stitch in a wale, the next stitch can pass through the previous loop from either below or above. If the former, the stitch is denoted as a 'knit stitch' or a 'plain stitch;' if the latter, as a 'purl stitch'. The two stitches are related in that a knit stitch seen from one side of the fabric appears as a purl stitch on the other side.

The two types of stitches have a different visual effect; the knit stitches look like 'V's stacked vertically, whereas the purl stitches look like a wavy horizontal line across the fabric. Patterns and pictures can be created in knitted fabrics by using knit and purl stitches as "pixels"; however, such pixels are usually rectangular, rather than square, depending on the gauge/tension of the knitting. Individual stitches, or rows of stitches, may be made taller by drawing more yarn into the new loop (an elongated stitch), which is the basis for uneven knitting: a row of tall stitches may alternate with one or more rows of short stitches for an interesting visual effect. Short and tall stitches may also alternate within a row, forming a fish-like oval pattern.

If every row of stitches are all knit (or all purl), we have a garter stitch fabric. Alternating rows of all knit stitches and all purl stitches creates a stockinette stitch/stocking stitch pattern. Vertical stripes (ribbing) are possible by having alternating wales of knit and purl stitches. For example, a common choice is 2x2 ribbing, in which two wales of knit stitches are followed by two wales of purl stitches, etc. Horizontal striping (welting) is also possible, by alternating rows of knit and purl stitches. Checkerboard patterns (basketweave) are also possible, the smallest of which is known as seed/moss stitch: the stitches alternate between knit and purl in every wale and along every row.

Fabrics in which each knitted row is followed by a purled row, such as in stockinette/stocking stitch, have a tendency to curl—top and bottom curl toward the front (or knitted side) while the sides curl toward the back (or purled side); by contrast, those in which knit and purl stitches are arranged symmetrically (such as ribbing, garter stitch or seed/moss stitch) have more texture and tend to lie flat. Wales of purl stitches have a tendency to recede, whereas those of knit stitches tend to come forward, giving the fabric more stretchability. Thus, the purl wales in ribbing tend to be invisible, since the neighboring knit wales come forward. Conversely, rows of purl stitches tend to form an embossed ridge relative to a row of knit stitches. This is the basis of shadow knitting, in which the appearance of a knitted fabric changes when viewed from different directions.

Typically, a new stitch is passed through a single unsecured ('active') loop, thus lengthening that wale by one stitch. However, this need not be so; the new loop may be passed through an already secured stitch lower down on the fabric, or even between secured stitches (a dip stitch). Depending on the distance between where the loop is drawn through the fabric and where it is knitted, dip stitches can produce a subtle stippling or long lines across the surface of the fabric, e.g., the lower leaves of a flower. The new loop may also be passed between two stitches in the 'present' row, thus clustering the intervening stitches; this approach is often used to produce a smocking effect in the fabric. The new loop may also be passed through 'two or more' previous stitches, producing a decrease and merging wales together. The merged stitches need not be from the same row; for example, a tuck can be formed by knitting stitches together from two different rows, producing a raised horizontal welt on the fabric.

Not every stitch in a row need be knitted; some may be 'missed' (unknitted and passed to the active needle) and knitted on a subsequent row. This is known as slip-stitch knitting. The slipped stitches are naturally longer than the knitted ones. For example, a stitch slipped for one row before knitting would be roughly twice as tall as its knitted counterparts. This can produce interesting visual effects, although the resulting fabric is more rigid because the slipped stitch 'pulls' on its neighbours and is less deformable. Mosaic knitting is a form of slip-stitch knitting that knits alternate colored rows and uses slip stitches to form patterns; mosaic-knit fabrics tend to be stiffer than patterned fabrics produced by other methods such as Fair-Isle knitting.

In some cases, a stitch may be deliberately left unsecured by a new stitch, and its wale allowed to disassemble. This is known as drop-stitch knitting, and produces a vertical ladder of see-through holes in the fabric, corresponding to where the wale had been.

=== Right- and left-plaited/twisted stitches ===
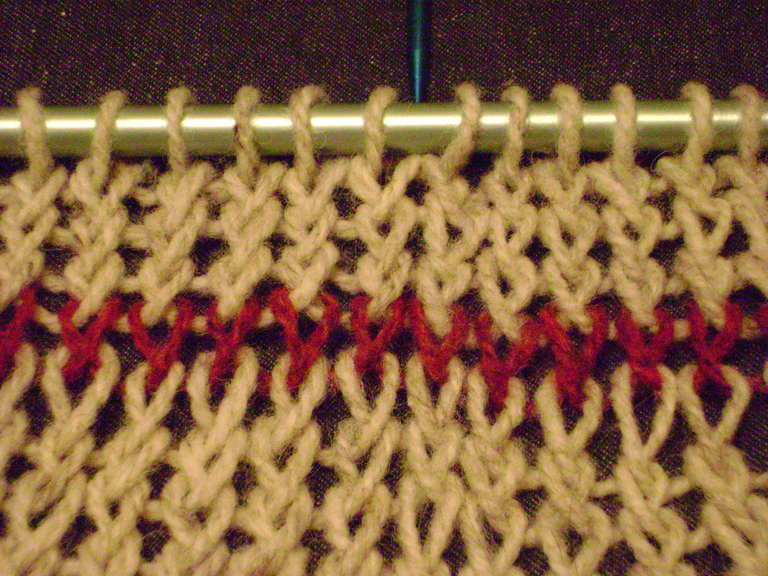
The stitches on the right are right-plaited, whereas the stitches on the left are left-plaited.

Both knit and purl stitches may be twisted: usually once if at all, but sometimes twice and (very rarely) thrice. When seen from above, the twist can be clockwise (right yarn over left) or counterclockwise (left yarn over right); these are denoted as right- and left-plaited stitches, respectively. Hand-knitters generally produce right-plaited stitches by knitting or purling through the back loops, i.e., passing the needle through the initial stitch in an unusual way, but wrapping the yarn as usual. By contrast, the left-plaited stitch is generally formed by hand-knitters by wrapping the yarn in the opposite way, rather than by any change in the needle. Although they are mirror images in form, right- and left-plaited stitches are functionally equivalent. Both types of plaited stitches give a subtle but interesting visual texture, and tend to draw the fabric inwards, making it stiffer. Plaited stitches are a common method for knitting jewelry from fine metal wire.

=== Edges and joins between fabrics ===
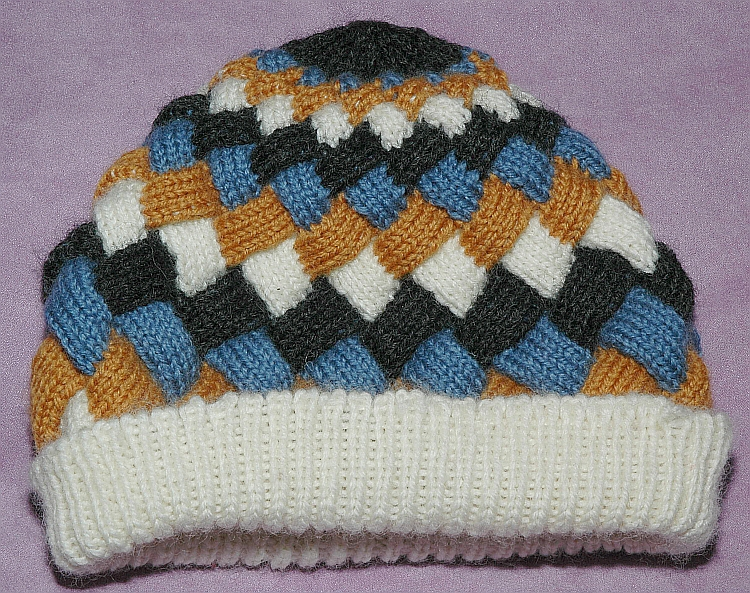
Illustration of entrelac. The blue and white wales are parallel to each other, but both are perpendicular to the black and gold wales, resembling basket weaving.

The initial and final edges of a knitted fabric are known as the cast-on and bound/cast-off edges. The side edges are known as the selvages; the word derives from "self-edges", meaning that the stitches do not need to be secured by anything else. Many types of selvages have been developed, with different elastic and ornamental properties.

Vertical and horizontal edges can be introduced within a knitted fabric, e.g., for button holes, by binding/casting off and re-casting on again (horizontal) or by knitting the fabrics on either side of a vertical edge separately.

Two knitted fabrics can be joined by embroidery-based grafting methods, most commonly the Kitchener stitch. New wales can be begun from any of the edges of a knitted fabric; this is known as picking up stitches and is the basis for entrelac, in which the wales run perpendicular to one another in a checkerboard pattern.

=== Cables, increases, and lace ===
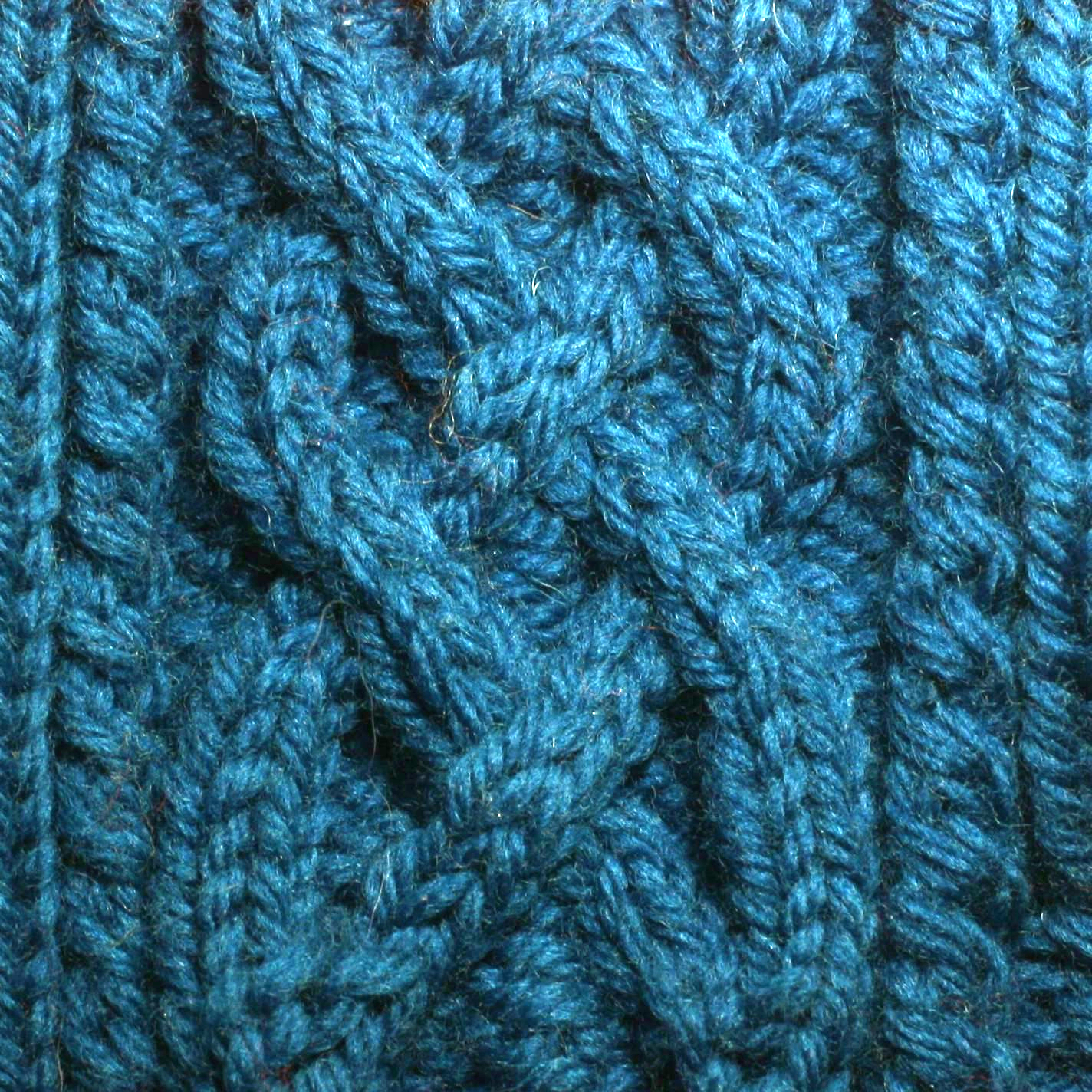
Illustration of cable knitting. The central braid is formed from 2×2 ribbing in which the background is formed of purl stitches and the cables are each two wales of knit stitches. By changing the order in which the stitches are knit, the wales can be made to cross.

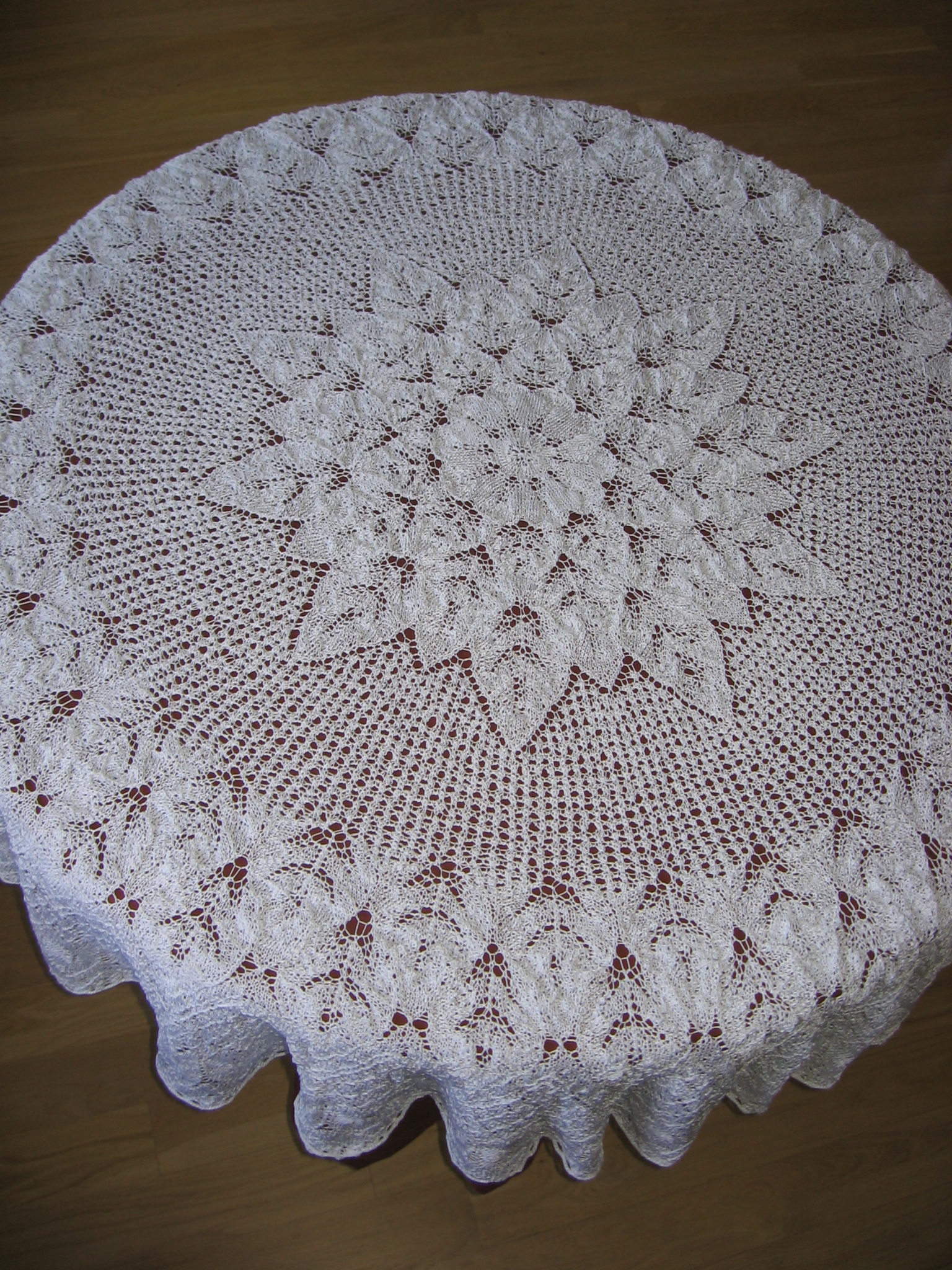
In lace knitting, the pattern is formed by making small, stable holes in the fabric, generally with yarn overs.

Ordinarily, stitches are knitted in the same order in every row, and the wales of the fabric run parallel and vertically along the fabric. However, this need not be so, since the order in which stitches are knitted may be permuted so that wales cross over one another, forming a cable pattern. Cable patterns tend to draw the fabric together, making it denser and less elastic; Aran sweaters are a common form of knitted cabling. Arbitrarily complex braid patterns can be done in cable knitting, with the proviso that the wales must move ever upwards; it is generally impossible for a wale to move up and then down the fabric. Knitters have developed methods for giving the illusion of a circular wale, such as appear in Celtic knots, but these are inexact approximations. However, such circular wales are possible using Swiss darning, a form of embroidery, or by knitting a tube separately and attaching it to the knitted fabric.

A wale can split into two or more wales using increases, most commonly involving a yarn over. Depending on how the increase is done, there is often a hole in the fabric at the point of the increase. This is used to great effect in lace knitting, which consists of making patterns and pictures using such holes, rather than with the stitches themselves. The large and many holes in lacy knitting makes it extremely elastic; for example, some Shetland "wedding-ring" shawls are so fine that they may be drawn through a wedding ring.

By combining increases and decreases, it is possible to make the direction of a wale slant away from vertical, even in weft knitting. This is the basis for bias knitting, and can be used for visual effect, similar to the direction of a brush-stroke in oil painting.

=== Ornamentations and additions ===
Various point-like ornaments may be added to knitting for their look or to improve the wear of the fabric. Examples include various types of bobbles, sequins and beads. Long loops can also be drawn out and secured, forming a "shaggy" texture to the fabric; this is known as loop knitting. Additional patterns can be made on the surface of the knitted fabric using embroidery; if the embroidery resembles knitting, it is often called Swiss darning. Various closures for the garments, such as frogs and buttons can be added; usually buttonholes are knitted into the garment, rather than cut.

Ornamental pieces may also be knitted separately and then attached using applique. For example, differently colored leaves and petals of a flower could be knit separately and attached to form the final picture. Separately knitted tubes can be applied to a knitted fabric to form complex Celtic knots and other patterns that would be difficult to knit.

Unknitted yarns may be worked into knitted fabrics for warmth, as is done in tufting and "weaving" (also known as "couching").

== Properties of fabrics ==
The topology of a knitted fabric is relatively complex. Unlike woven fabrics, where strands usually run straight horizontally and vertically, yarn that has been knitted follows a looped path along its row, as with the red strand in the diagram in this section, in which the loops of one row have all been pulled through the loops of the row below it.

While a straight line of yarn has limited elasticity, a knitted piece of fabric has stretch in multiple directions based on the stitches used. This elasticity is all but unavailable in woven fabrics which only stretch along the bias. Many modern stretchy garments, even as they rely on elastic synthetic materials for some stretch, also achieve at least some of their stretch through knitted patterns.

The basic knitted fabric (as in the diagram, and usually called a stocking or stockinette pattern) has a definite "right side" and "wrong side". On the right side, the visible portions of the loops are the verticals connecting two rows which are arranged in a grid of V shapes. On the wrong side, the ends of the loops are visible, both the tops and bottoms, creating a much more bumpy texture sometimes called reverse stockinette. Despite being the "wrong side", reverse stockinette is frequently used as a pattern in its own right. Because the yarn holding rows together is all on the front, and the yarn holding side-by-side stitches together is all on the back, stockinette fabric has a strong tendency to curl toward the front on the top and bottom, and toward the back on the left and right side.

Stitches can be worked from either side, and various patterns are created by mixing regular knit stitches with the "wrong side" stitches, known as purl stitches, either in columns (ribbing), rows (garter, welting), or more complex patterns. Each fabric has different properties: a garter stitch has much more vertical stretch, while ribbing stretches much more horizontally. Because of their front-back symmetry, these two fabrics have little curl, making them popular as edging, even when their stretch properties are not desired.

The basic knitted fabrics are referred to by different names in the setting of industrial manufacture. The fabric known by hand knitters as stockinette is called plain knit or jersey, and the fabric known by hand knitters as garter is called purl knitting or links-and-links.

Different stitch combinations produce varied fabrics.

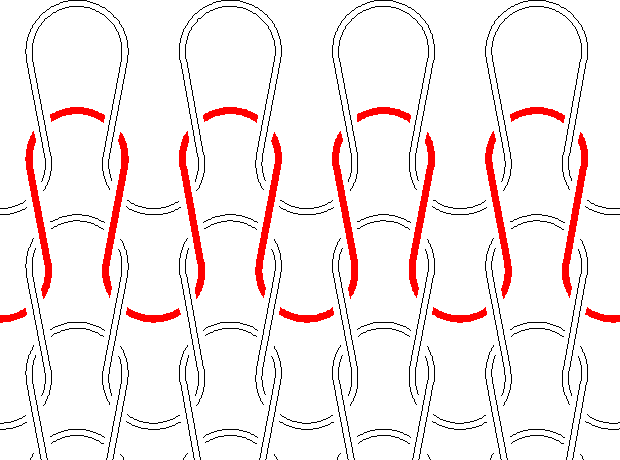
Schematic of stockinette stitch, the most basic weft-knit fabric

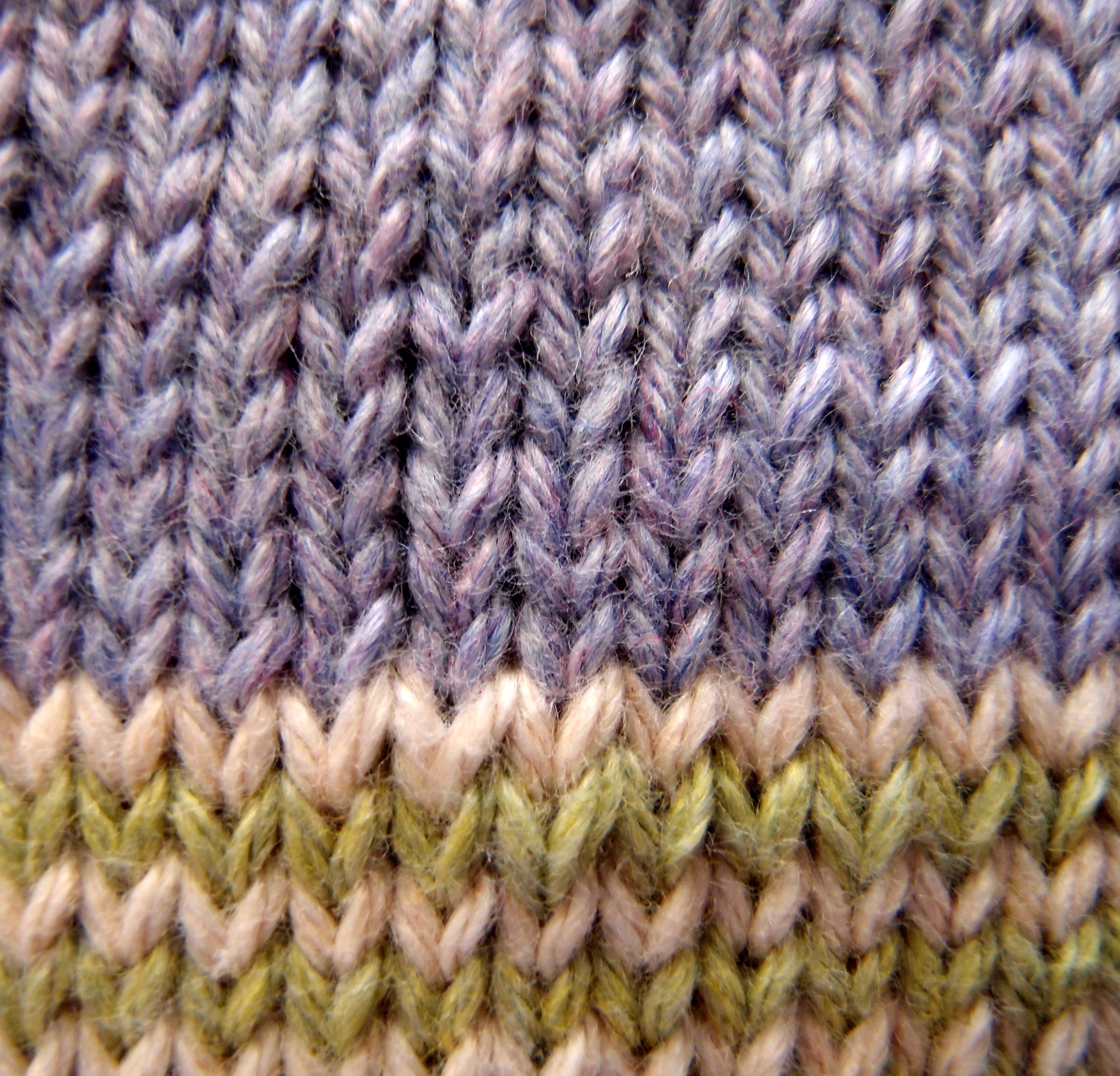
Close-up of front of stockinette stitch

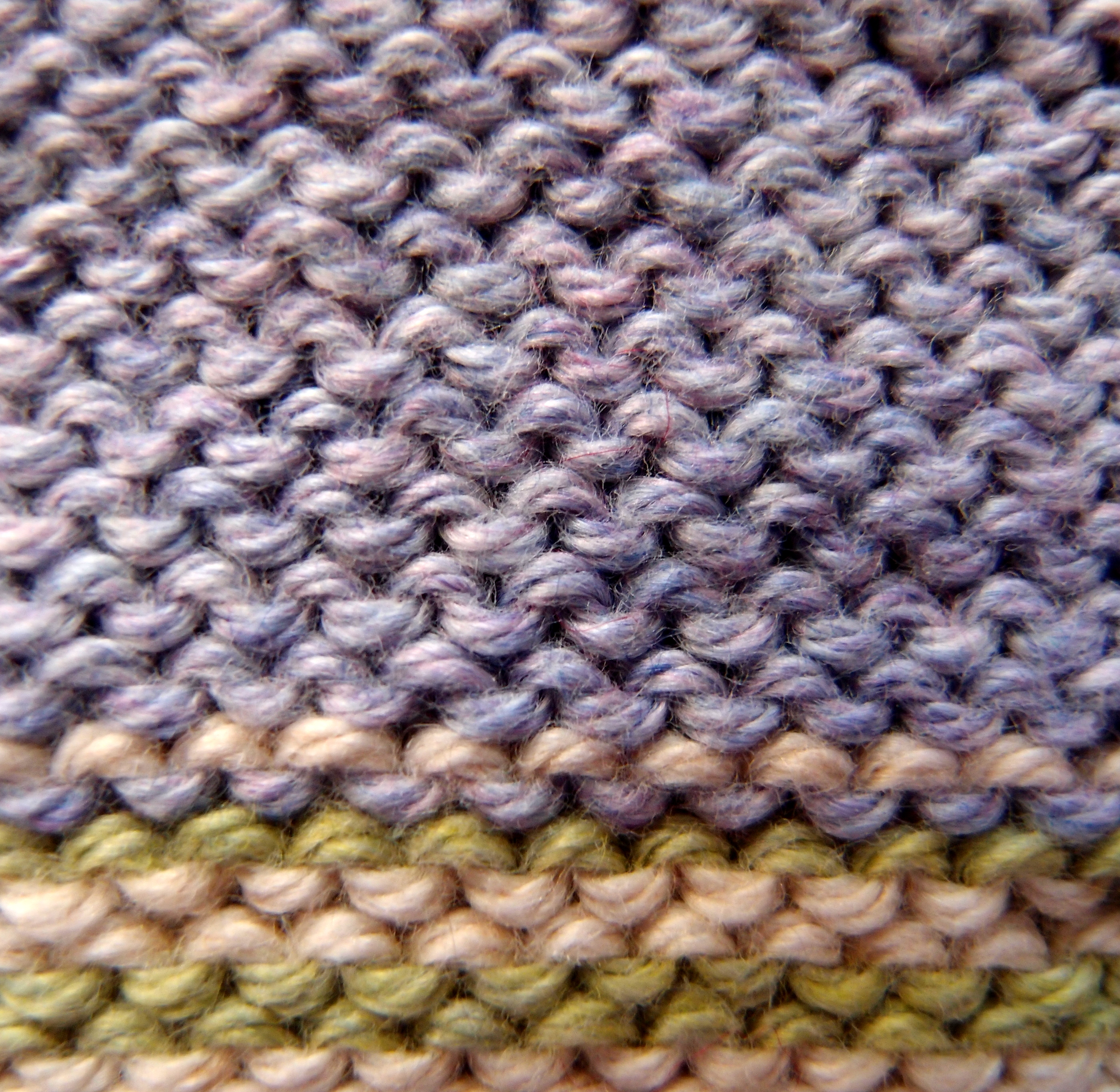
Close-up of back of stockinette stitch, also same appearance as reverse stockinette stitch

=== Texture ===
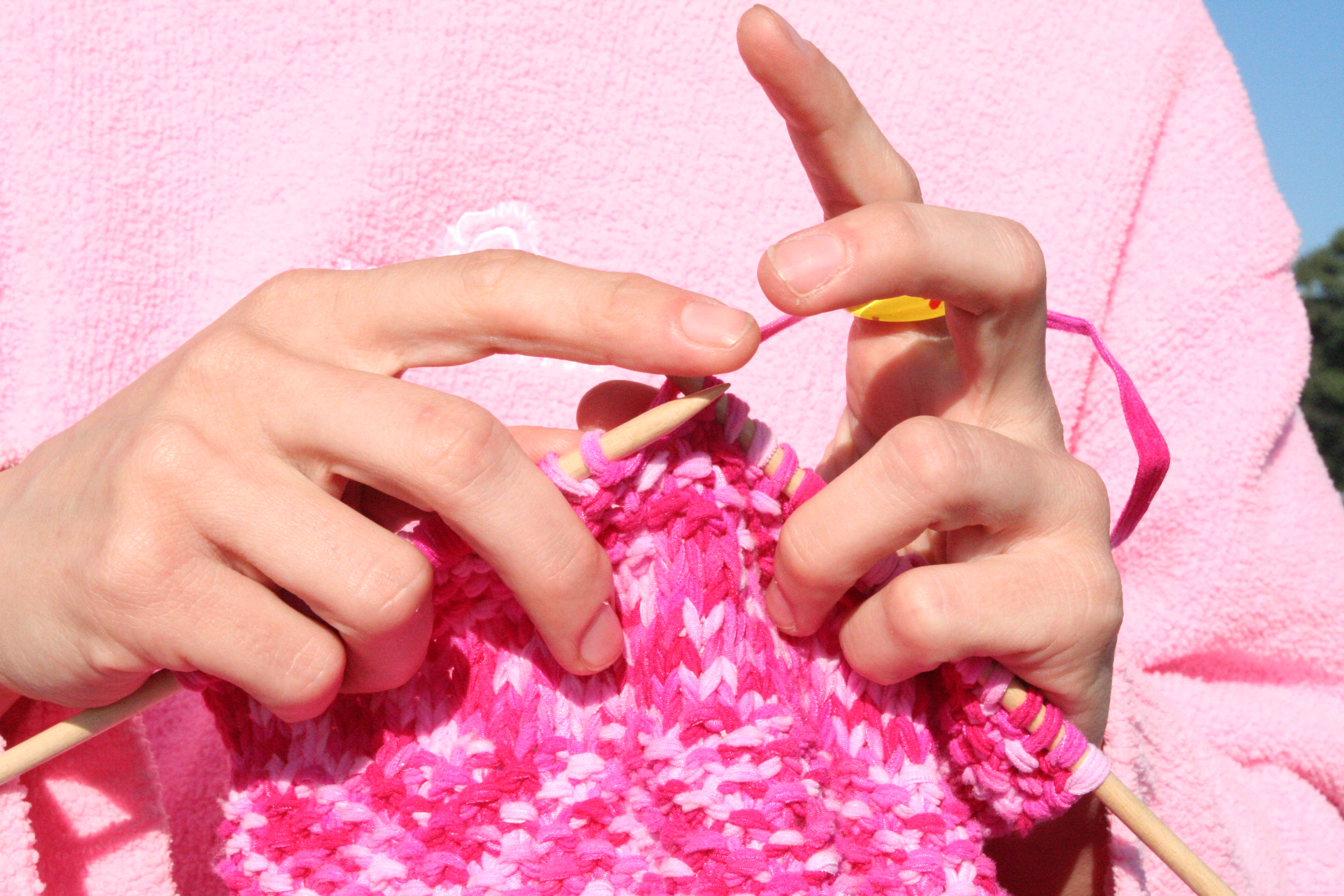
Close-up of knitting

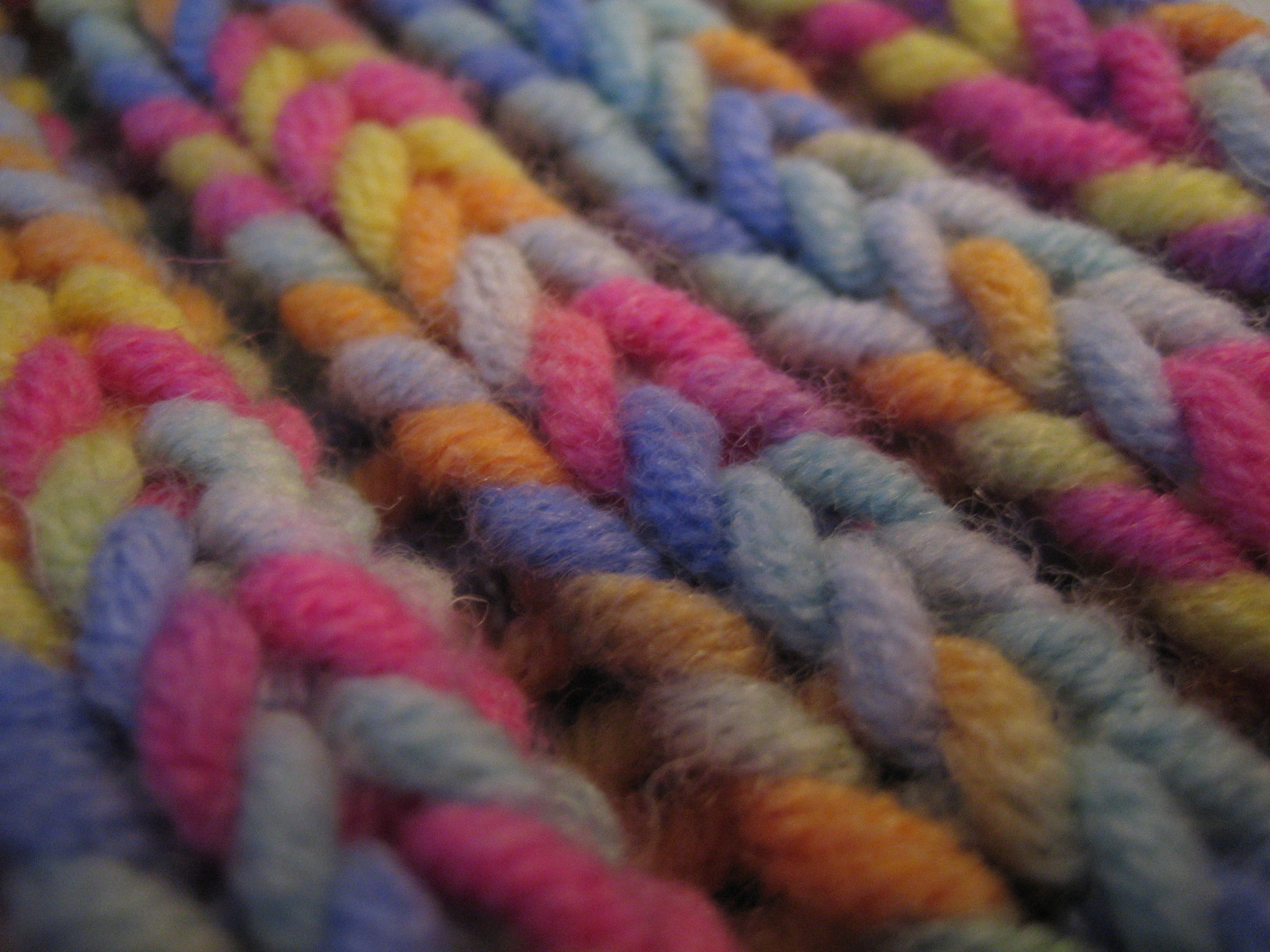
Close-up of ribbing

The most common texture for a knitted garment is that generated by the flat stockinette stitch which is worked in the round as solely knit stitches, and worked flat as alternating rows of knit and purl. Other simple textures can be made with knit and purl stitches, including garter stitch, ribbing, and moss and seed stitches. Adding a "slip stitch" (where a loop is passed from one needle to the other) allows for a wide range of textures, including heel and linen stitches as well as a number of more complicated patterns.

Some more advanced knitting techniques create a surprising variety of complex textures. Combining certain increases, which can create small eyelet holes in the resulting fabric, with assorted decreases is key to creating knitted lace, a very open fabric resembling needle or bobbin lace. Open vertical stripes can be created using the drop-stitch knitting technique. Changing the order of stitches from one row to the next, usually with the help of a cable needle or stitch holder, is key to cable knitting, producing an endless variety of cables, honeycombs, ropes, and Aran sweater patterning. Entrelac forms a rich checkerboard texture by knitting small squares, picking up their side edges, and knitting more squares to continue the piece.

Fair Isle knitting uses two or more colored yarns to create patterns and forms a thicker and less flexible fabric.

The appearance of a garment is also affected by the weight of the yarn, which describes the thickness of the spun fibre. The thicker the yarn, the more visible and apparent stitches will be; the thinner the yarn, the finer the texture.

=== Color ===
Plenty of finished knitting projects never use more than a single color of yarn, but there are many ways to work in multiple colors. Some yarns are dyed to be either variegated (changing color every few stitches in a random fashion) or self-striping (changing every few rows). More complicated techniques permit large fields of color (intarsia, for example), busy small-scale patterns of color (such as Fair Isle), or both (double knitting and slip-stitch color, for example).

Yarn with multiple shades of the same hue are called ombre, while a yarn with multiple hues may be known as a given colorway. Heathered yarns contain small amounts of fibre of different colours, while tweed yarns may have greater amounts of different colored fibres.

== Hand knitting ==
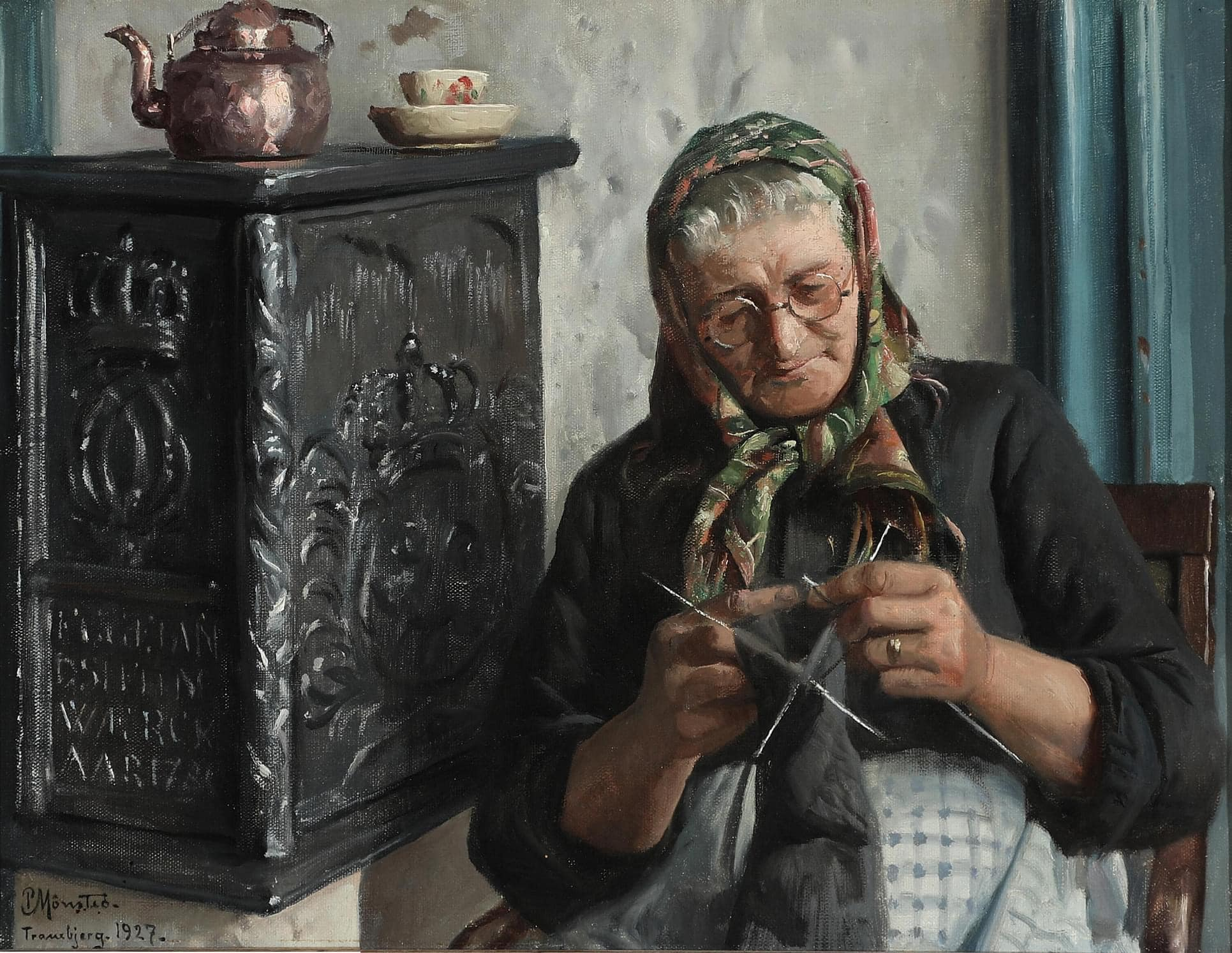
An old lady knitting in the kitchen (1927)

There are many hundreds of different knitting stitches used by hand knitters. A piece of hand knitting begins with the process of casting on, which involves the initial creation of the stitches on the needle. Different methods of casting on are used for different effects: one may be stretchy enough for lace, while another provides a decorative edging. Provisional cast-ons are used when the knitting will continue in both directions from the cast-on. There are various methods employed to cast on, such as the "thumb method" (also known as "slingshot" or "long-tail" cast-ons), where the stitches are created by a series of loops that will, when knitted, give a very loose edge ideal for "picking up stitches" and knitting a border; the "double needle method" (also known as "knit-on" or "cable cast-on"), whereby each loop placed on the needle is then "knitted on", which produces a firmer edge ideal on its own as a border; and many more. The number of active stitches remains the same as when cast on unless stitches are added (an increase) or removed (a decrease).

Most Western-style hand knitters follow either the English style (in which the yarn is held in the dominant hand) or the Continental style (in which the yarn is held in the non-dominant hand).

There are also different ways to insert the needle into the stitch. Knitting through the front of a stitch is called Western knitting. Going through the back of a stitch is called Eastern knitting. A third method, called combination knitting, goes through the front of a purl stitch and the back of a knit stitch.

Once the hand knitted piece is finished, the remaining live stitches are "cast off". Casting (or "binding") off loops the stitches across each other so they can be removed from the needle without unravelling the item. Although the mechanics are different from casting on, there is a similar variety of methods.

In hand knitting certain articles of clothing, especially larger ones like sweaters, the final knitted garment will be made of several knitted pieces, with individual sections of the garment hand knitted separately and then sewn together. Seamless knitting, where a whole garment is hand knit as a single piece, is also possible. Elizabeth Zimmermann is probably the best-known proponent of seamless or circular hand knitting techniques. Smaller items, such as socks and hats, are usually knit in one piece on double-pointed needles or circular needles. Hats in particular can be started "top down" on double pointed needles with the increases added until the preferred size is achieved, switching to an appropriate circular needle when enough stitches have been added. Care must be taken to bind off at a tension that will allow the "give" needed to comfortably fit on the head. (See Circular knitting.)

The process of knitting has three basic tasks:

1. the active (unsecured) stitches must be held so they do not drop
2. these stitches must be released sometime after they are secured
3. new bights of yarn must be passed through the fabric, usually through active stitches, thus securing them.

=== Hand knitting tools ===
In very simple cases, knitting can be done without tools, using only the fingers to do these tasks; however, knitting is usually carried out using tools such as knitting needles, knitting machines or rigid frames. Depending on their size and shape, the rigid frames are called stocking frames, knitting boards, knitting rings (also called knitting looms) or knitting spools (also known as knitting knobbies, knitting nancies, or corkers). There is also a technique called knooking of knitting with a crochet hook that has a cord attached to the end, to hold the stitches while they're being worked.

The type of knitting needle used in hand knitting is chosen based on the knitter's own preference and the nature of their project. Common types of knitting needles are the straight single-pointed needles, double-pointed needles, and circular needles. It is important that the knitter choose the correct size of knitting needle for their project to ensure that they get the right gauge, so that it results in the intended size. Knitting needles also come in different materials, typically wood or metal, which can affect the knitting experience.

Other than knitting needles, knitters also use other tools to aid in their knitting. Stitch markers can be used to mark important places in a project, e.g. the start of a round. A measuring tape can be used to measure a project and a knitting needle gauge can measure the size of a knitting needle. A wool needle is used to weave in the ends and a scissor for cutting the yarn. A knitter might also use stitch holders to hold live stitches in a project temporarily if they e.g. need the knitting needles for a different project. When knitting cables, a cable needle can be used.

=== Hand knitting styles/holds ===
==== Continental/German style ====
Continental knitting is achieved by holding the yarn in the left hand for both knitting and purling. Patterns are created on the outside (public-facing) side of the piece.

==== Norwegian style ====
While knit stitches are worked as in the classic Continental style, the purl is worked by leaving the yarn at back and moving the needle.

==== Russian style ====
Another variation on Continental knitting, this style is achieved by "picking" up the yarn by moving the needle head into it. Then, the yarn is wrapped around the index finger on the left hand so it is coming over the top of the finger, back around underneath, and then on top of the middle finger. The knitter will wind up with their index finger very close to the back of the left-hand needle. In Russian knitting, it is common to slip the first stitch of every row.

==== English style ====
English-style knitting is achieved by holding the yarn in the right hand. Patterns are created on the outside (public-facing) side of the piece.

==== Portuguese/Greek/Incan/Turkish style ====
This style is achieved by carrying the yarn around the neck or from a necklace-style hook, allowing the knitter to knit on the reverse (purl) side, e.g. "inside out" compared to Western knitting techniques. Patterns are typically created by stranding the yarn on the outside of the piece. This is an ancient style of knitting, which spread from Arabic culture to the Iberian peninsula, during its occupation by Muslims. Hence this style was taught to Indigenous South Americans, during conquest by Spanish/Portuguese colonists.

==== Armenian ====
The Armenian knitting technique tacks the non-working yarn to the piece regularly to limit floats. The non-working yarn is tacked down approximately every 3 stitches.

==== Double knitting ====
A technique used to create a flat, smooth, reversible fabric that looks like stockinette or jersey on both sides, rather than having a knit face and a purl reverse side.

==== Fair Isle ====
A method by which many different yarns are used throughout the row and when not being used are floated on the wrong side of the piece.

==== Mega knitting ====
Mega knitting is a term recently coined and relates to the use of knitting needles greater than or equal to half an inch in diameter.

Mega knitting uses the same stitches and techniques as conventional knitting, except that hooks are carved into the ends of the needles. The hooked needles greatly enhance control of the work, catching the stitches and preventing them from slipping off.

It was the development of the knitting machine that introduced hooked needles and enabled faultless, automated knitting. The hook catches the loop of yarn as each stitch is knitted, meaning that wrists and fingers do not have to work so hard and there is less chance of stitches slipping off the needle. The position of the hook is most important. The left (non-working) hook is turned to face away at all times; the right (working) hook is turned toward the knitter whilst knitting (plain stitch) and away whilst purling.

Mega knitting produces a chunky, bulky fabric or an open lacy weave, depending on the weight and type of yarn used.

==== Micro knitting ====
Micro knitting or miniature knitting uses extremely fine threads and needles. Althea Crome created 14 tiny sweaters used in the stop motion animated film Coraline and has made objects at 60 or 80 stitches per inch, making her own needles from fine surgical steel wire. Annelies de Kort has knitted on an even smaller scale and has used needles of 0.4 mm.

==== Short row ====
In short row knitting, the work is turned before a row is fully knitted. There are several ways to achieve this.

==== Wrap and turn ====
Just before the work is turned, the working yarn is passed around the next unknitted stitch, forming a "wrap". Later, this "wrap" is picked up and knitted into a stitch, concealing it from view.

==== German short row ====
In German short rows, the work is turned and the last stitch worked is slipped purlwise with yarn in front to the right needle. Finally, the working yarn is pulled over the top of the needle to the back, which rotates the stitch on the needle so that it tips backwards, forming what appears to be a double-stitch, sometimes referred to as a "German double stitch". The working yarn stays to the back for the next stitch if it is to be knitted, or rotated below the right needle and pulled to the front, if it is to be purled, both of which maintain the proper ("tipped back") orientation of the German double stitch. Eventually, this German double stitch is worked like a single stitch, which masks its appearance as viewed from the right side to look like a regular stitch.

==== Japanese short row ====
In Japanese short rows, a locking stitch marker is used to hold the loop of the working yarn at the turning point. Eventually, the loop is picked up (and stitch marker removed) and worked together with the stitch on the other side of the gap. Japanese short rows usually result in tidier turning points with less extraneous yarn bulk compared to German short rows and the Wrap and Turn technique.

==== Twined knitting ====
The technique, also known as two-end knitting, is a traditional Scandinavian knitting technique. It refers to knitting where two strands of yarn are knitted into the fabric alternatively and twisted once and always in the same direction before every stitch. This produces a firmer and more durable fabric with greater thermal insulation than conventional one-end knitting.

=== Left-handed knitting ===
Most knitting patterns, tutorials, and instructions are written with right-handed knitters in mind (who knit from right to left with the working needle held in the right hand). Left-handed knitters sometimes learn to knit this way as well, while others learn to hold the working needle in the left hand and knit from left to right, a technique often called mirror knitting.

When following patterns written for right-handed knitters, mirror knitters swap the terms "left" and "right," while the underlying process and instructions remain the same. For example, a make-one-left increase, when worked by a mirror knitter, will actually lean to the right. The same principle applies to garment construction: if a pattern's instructions are written for the right shoulder of a sweater, a mirror knitter following those same instructions will produce the left shoulder. In this way, the order in which the garment is constructed is mirrored, but the finished product is the same.

When working from a charted pattern, mirror knitters read the chart in the opposite direction, i.e., left to right on right side rows and right to left on wrong side rows. For techniques such as colorwork, lace, or cables, knitters must reverse the chart to ensure the finished design comes out correctly formatted.

== Materials ==
=== Yarn ===
Yarn for hand-knitting is usually sold as balls or skeins (hanks), and it may also be wound on spools or cones, which is useful for machine knitting. The yarn used for knitting is typically sheep wool, acrylic yarn, cotton, mohair, cashmere, alpaca, or linen. They can be found in a variety of colours, and various speciality yarns can also be found, e.g. glitter yarn.

The thickness or weight of the yarn is a significant factor in determining the gauge/tension, i.e., how many stitches and rows are required to cover a given area for a given stitch pattern. Thicker yarns generally require thicker knitting needles, whereas thinner yarns may be knit with thick or thin needles. Hence, thicker yarns generally require fewer stitches, and therefore less time, to knit up a given garment. Patterns and motifs are coarser with thicker yarns; thicker yarns produce bold visual effects, whereas thinner yarns are best for refined patterns. Yarns are grouped by thickness into the following categories: lace, superfine (fingering or sock), fine (sport), light (double knit or DK), medium (worsted and aran), bulky, superbulky, and jumbo.

=== Metal wire ===
There are multiple commercial applications for knit fabric made of metal wire by knitting machines. Steel wire of various sizes may be used for electric and magnetic shielding due to its conductivity. Metal wire is suitable for knitting and used as jewellery. This may incorporate beads of various materials and ornaments such as seashells.

=== Glass and wax ===
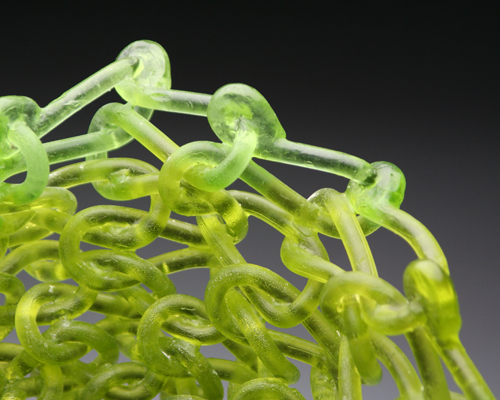
Close-up of "Jitterbug" – knitted glass by Carol Milne

Knitted glass combines knitting with wax strands, lost-wax casting, mold-making, and kiln-casting.

== Machine knitting ==
Knitting can also be performed by machines. The first knitting machine, known as the stocking frame, was invented in England in 1589. Modern knitting machines, both domestic and industrial, are either flat-bed or circular. Flat-bed knitting machines knit back and forth, producing a flat piece of fabric. Flat-bed machines can produce uniform-width fabric which can be cut and sewn into garments, or they can produce shaped pieces which can be seamed to make garments without cutting. The latter is known as full-fashioned knitting. Circular knitting machines knit in a continuous circle, producing a tubular piece of fabric. Similarly to knitted fabrics manufactured on flat-bed machines, a tube of uniform-width fabric may be cut along one side to produce flat fabric which can be cut and sewn into garments. Fabric produced in this way can be cheaper than fabric produced on a flat-bed machine, as circular machines can operate at higher speed. Circular knitting machines can also be used to create shaped, finished articles, such as socks.

== Commercial applications ==
Industrially, metal wire is also knitted into a metal fabric for a wide range of uses including the filter material in cafetieres, catalytic converters for cars and many other uses. These fabrics are usually manufactured on circular knitting machines that would be recognized by conventional knitters as sock machines.

Knitting mills are factories that produce knitted fabrics or knitted apparel. Knitted fabrics are used in the manufacture of highly-fitted garments such as athleticwear and athleisure. The stretch properties of knitted fabrics may be enhanced by the inclusion of fibers such as spandex. In addition to athletic-type garments, knitted fabric may be used in fashion garments.

Many fashion designers make heavy use of knitted fabric in their fashion collections. Gordana Gelhausen, who appeared in season six of the television show Project Runway, is primarily a knit designer. Other designers and labels that make heavy use of knitting include Michael Kors, Fendi, and Marc Jacobs.

Knitting mills can also produce completed knitted apparel, such as sweaters, socks, T-shirts, and underwear. Beginning in the 1990s, seamless 3-dimensional whole-garment knitting machines have increased the options of finished garments that can be produced in knitting mills. These machines have also enabled the production of knitted shoe uppers.

For individual hobbyists, websites such as Etsy, Big Cartel and Ravelry have made it easy to sell knitting patterns on a small scale, in a way similar to eBay.

== Graffiti ==
In the 2000s, a practice called knitting graffiti, guerilla knitting, or yarn bombing—the use of knitted or crocheted cloth to modify and beautify one's (usually outdoor) surroundings—emerged in the US and spread worldwide. Magda Sayeg is credited with starting the movement in the US and Knit the City are a prominent group of graffiti knitters in the United Kingdom. Yarn bombers sometimes target existing pieces of graffiti for beautification. For instance, Dave Cole is a contemporary sculpture artist who practiced knitting as graffiti for a large-scale public art installation in Melbourne, Australia for the Big West Arts Festival in 2009. The work was vandalized the night of its completion. A new movie, shot by a Tasmanian filmmaker on a set made almost entirely out of yarn, was partially inspired by "knitted graffiti".

== Yarn crawl ==
Many major metropolitan cities across the US and Europe host annual yarn crawls. The event is typically a multi-day event that caters to all knitters, crochet and yarn enthusiasts that supports the local crafting community. Over the multi-day period, multiple local yarn and knit shops participate in the yarn crawl and offer up store discounts, give away free exclusive patterns, provide classes, trunk shows and conduct raffles for prizes. Participants of the crawl receive a passport and get their passport stamped at each store they visit along the crawl. Traditionally those that get their passports fully stamped are eligible to win a larger gift basket filled with yarn, knitting and crochet goodies. Some local crawls also provide a Knit-Along (KAL) or Crochet-Along (CAL) where attendees follow a specific pattern prior to the crawl and then proudly wear it during the crawl for others to see.

== Craftivism and charity ==
Hand knitting garments for free distribution to others have become a common practice among hand knitting groups. Girls and women hand-knitted socks, sweaters, scarves, mittens, gloves, and hats for soldiers in Crimea, the American Civil War, and the Boer Wars; this practice continued in World War I, World War II and the Korean War, and continues for soldiers in Iraq and Afghanistan. The Australian charity Wrap with Love continues to provide blankets hand knitted by volunteers to people most in need around the world who have been affected by war.

In the historical projects, yarn companies provided knitting patterns approved by the various branches of the armed services; often they were distributed by local chapters of the American Red Cross. Modern projects usually entail the hand knitting of hats or helmet liners; the liners provided for soldiers must be of 100% worsted-weight wool and be crafted using specific colors.

Clothing and afghans are frequently made for children, the elderly, and the economically disadvantaged in various countries. Pine Ridge Indian Reservation accepts donations for the Lakota people in the United States. Prayer shawls, or shawls in which the crafter meditates or says prayers of their faith while hand knitting with the intent on comforting the recipient, are donated to those experiencing loss or stress. Many knitters today hand knit and donate "chemo caps", soft caps for cancer patients who lose their hair during chemotherapy. Yarn companies offer free knitting patterns for these caps.

Penguin sweaters were hand knitted by volunteers for the rehabilitation of penguins contaminated by exposure to oil slicks. The project is now complete.

Chicken sweaters were also hand knitted to aid battery hens that had lost their feathers. The organization is not currently accepting donations, but maintains a list of volunteers.

Originally started after the 2004 Indonesian tsunami, Knitters Without Borders is a charity challenge issued by knitting personality Stephanie Pearl-McPhee that encourages hand knitters to donate to Médecins Sans Frontières (Doctors Without Borders). Instead of hand knitting for charity, knitters are encouraged to donate a week's worth of disposable income, including money that otherwise might have been spent on yarn. Knitted items are occasional offered as prizes to donors. As of September 2011, Knitters Without Borders donors have contributed C$1,062,217.

Security blankets can also be made through the Project Linus organization which helps needy children.

There are organizations that help reach other countries in need such as afghans for Afghans. This outreach is described as, "afghans for Afghans is a humanitarian and educational people-to-people project that sends hand-knit and crocheted blankets and sweaters, vests, hats, mittens, and socks to the beleaguered people of Afghanistan."

The knitters of the Little Yellow Duck Project craft small yellow ducks which are left for others to find, as a random act of kindness and to raise awareness of blood donation and organ donation. The project was started in memory of a young woman who had collected plastic toy ducks and who died from cystic fibrosis while waiting for a lung transplant. Finders of the ducks are encouraged to log them on a website, which as of May 2020 shows that 12,265 ducks have been found in 106 countries.

Beyond charity or humanitarian relief, craftivism in knitting spaces has also frequently taken the form of protest in support of certain political movements. Some scholars argue that craftivist demonstrations, including yarnbombing, illustrate the nature of fiber art as being part of a long tradition of feminist resistance and public disturbance. As such, recent research has explored craftivism and yarnbombing in the context of protest against colonialism, capitalism, slavery, gendered violence, and other issues. One example is the Pussyhat Project, in which knitting (and other fiber arts) came to the forefront of gender justice activism as knitters and crocheters mobilized in response to comments made regarding sexual assault by Donald Trump. The Pussyhat Project ultimately produced over a hundred thousand hats, distributed a day before the Women’s March on Washington on 19 January.

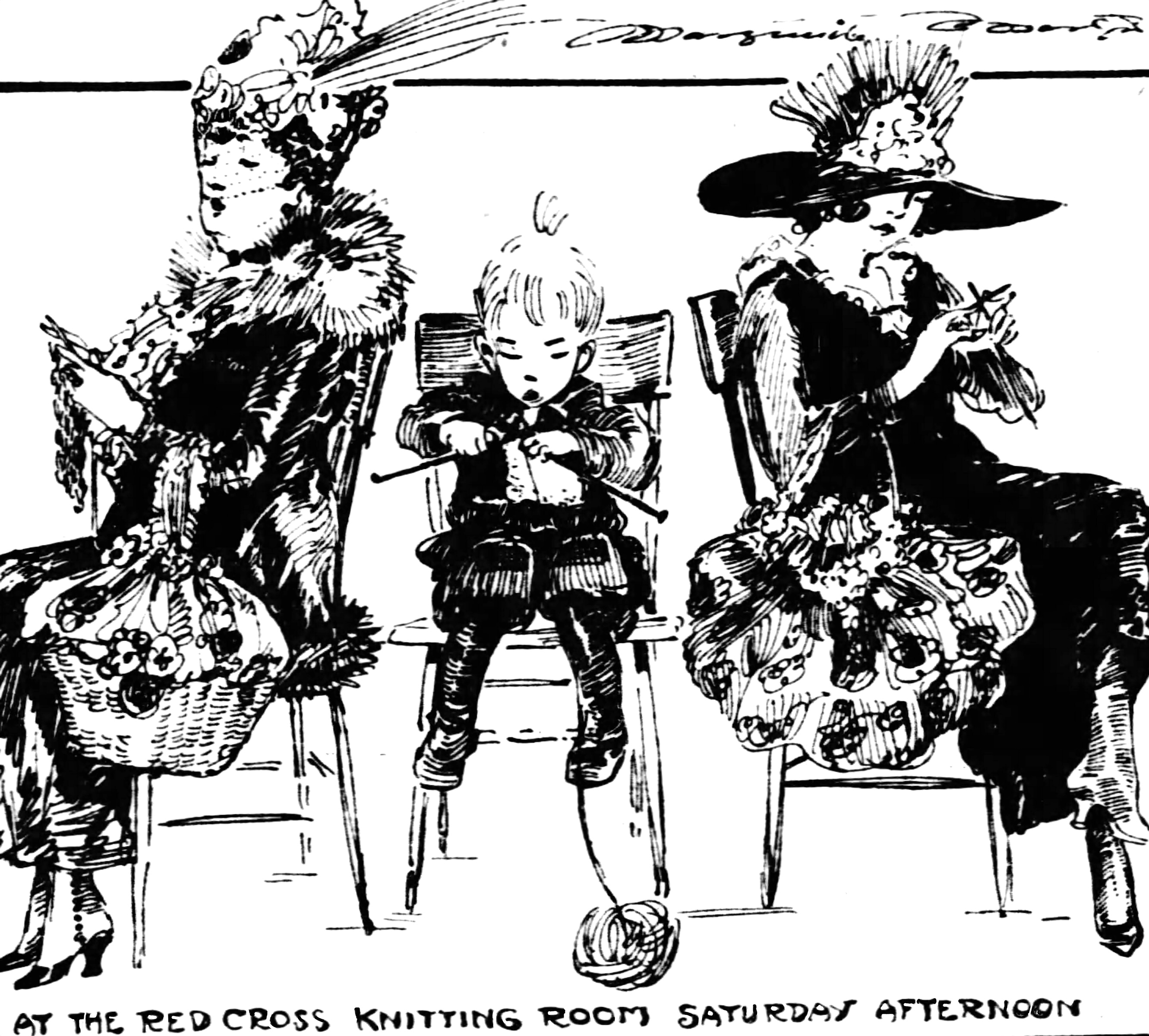
Drawing by Marguerite Martyn of two women and a child knitting for the war effort at a St. Louis, Missouri, Red Cross office in 1917

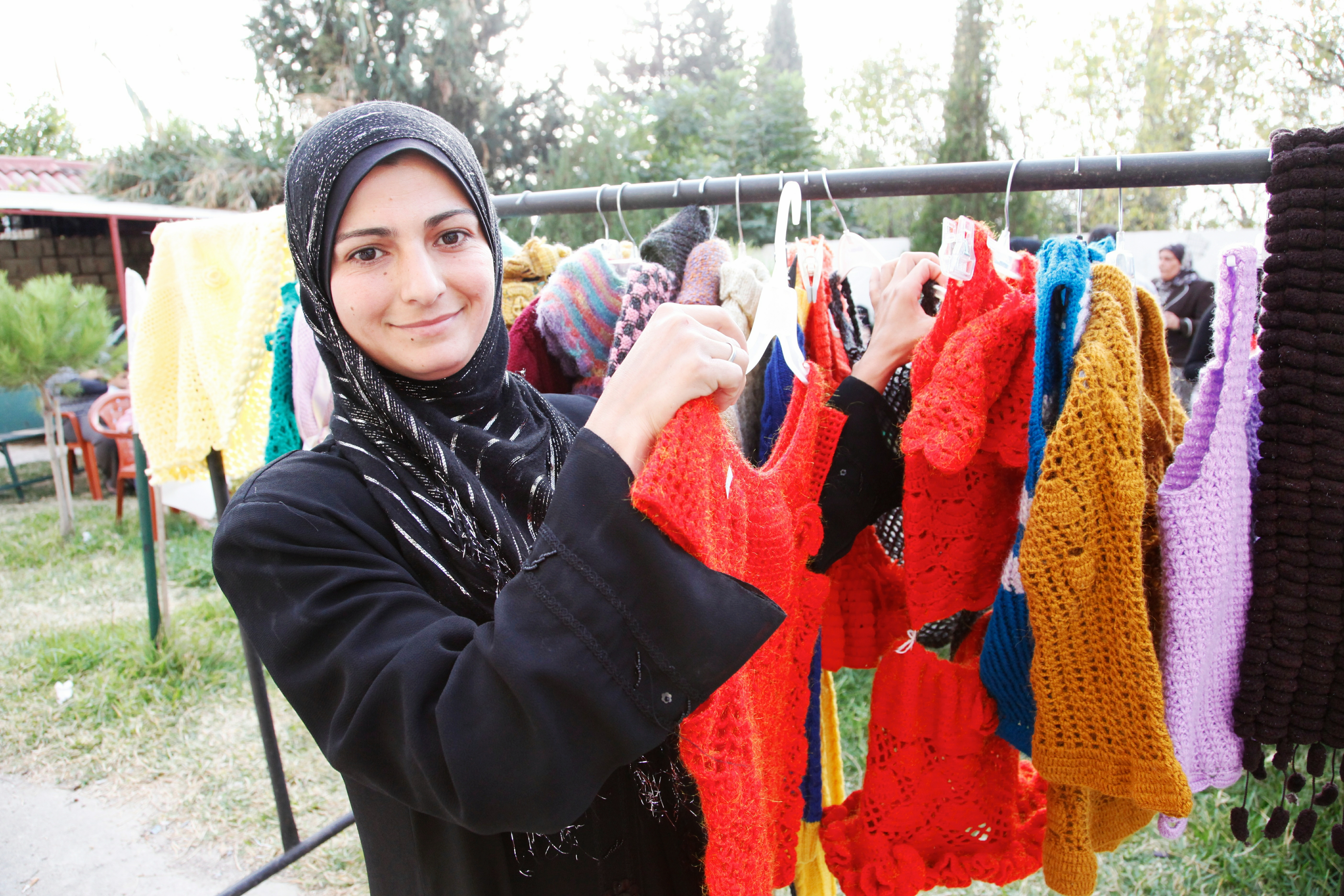
Some charities teach women to knit as a means of clothing their families or supporting themselves.

== Health benefits ==
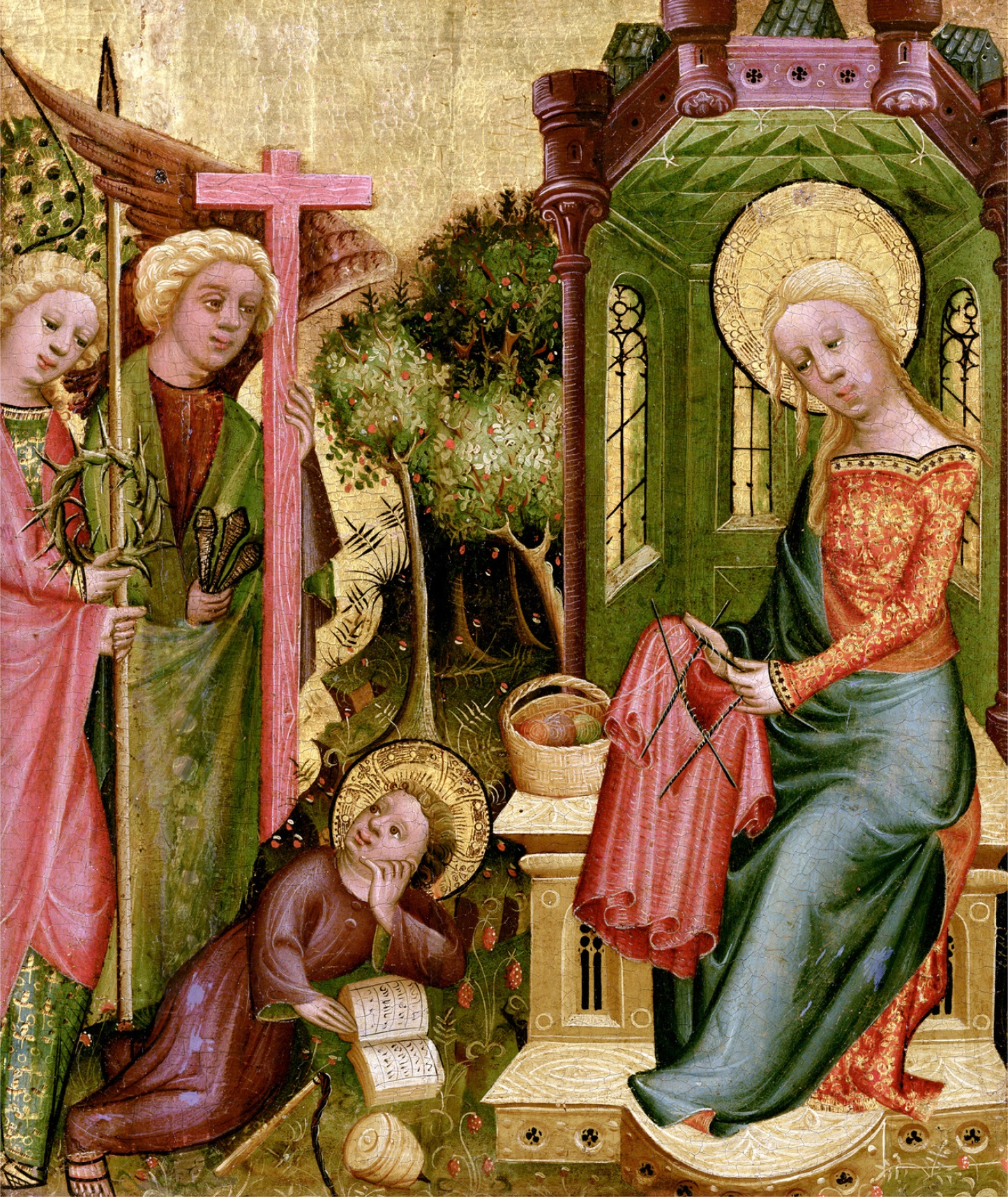
The earliest image of circular knitting, from the 15th century CE Buxtehude altarpiece

Studies have shown that hand knitting, along with other forms of needlework, provide several significant health benefits. These studies have found the rhythmic and repetitive action of hand knitting can help prevent and manage stress, pain and depression, which in turn strengthens the body's immune system, as well as create a relaxation response in the body which can decrease blood pressure, heart rate, help prevent illness, and have a calming effect. Pain specialists have also found that hand knitting changes brain chemistry, resulting in an increase in "feel good" hormones (i.e. serotonin and dopamine) and a decrease in stress hormones.

Knitting can improve dexterity in the hands and fingers. This keeps the fingers limber and can be especially helpful for those with arthritis. Knitting can reduce the pain of arthritis if people make it a daily habit.

Hand knitting, along with other leisure activities, has been linked to reducing the risk of developing dementia by preventing memory loss. Much like physical activity strengthens the body, mental exercise makes the human brain more resilient.

Knitting also helps in the area of social interaction; knitting provides people with opportunities to socialize with others and build community. One way to increase social interaction with knitting is inviting friends over to knit and chat with each other. Many public libraries and yarn stores host knitting groups where knitters can meet locally to engage with others interested in hand crafts.

Knitting has been shown to be an effective form of art therapy for coping with trauma or grief. Whether the knitting is done individually or in a knitting group, the creativity and creation process along with the repetitive physical motion has been shown to be effective.

== Knitting in culture and media ==
=== Literature ===
Knitting is featured in some literature. Knitting and its techniques may be used as a metaphor; its meditative and spiritual aspects may be emphasised; it may signal various types of domesticity; or it may be used for dramatic irony, as when an apparently harmless knitter proves deadly and implacable. Examples from 19th century novels include Madame Thérèse Defarge in Charles Dickens' A Tale of Two Cities, Anna Makarovna in Leo Tolstoy's War and Peace, various characters in Jane Austen's novels and Miss Ophelia in Harriet Beecher Stowe's Uncle Tom's Cabin. Several characters in Virginia Wolff's novels are knitters.

=== Television ===
Knitting was featured on television in 2025 as the theme of British reality show Game of Wool: Britain's Best Knitter, in which knitters compete against each other.

== See also ==
- Fiber art – Artworks made of textile materials
- Finger knitting – Form of knitting using the fingers
- Knitting clubs – Type of social club
- Sweater curse – Knitting superstition
- Textile manufacturing – Industry which produces textiles
- The Knitting Guild Association – Large US knitting association
