= Variegated yarn =

Yarn dyed with more than one colour

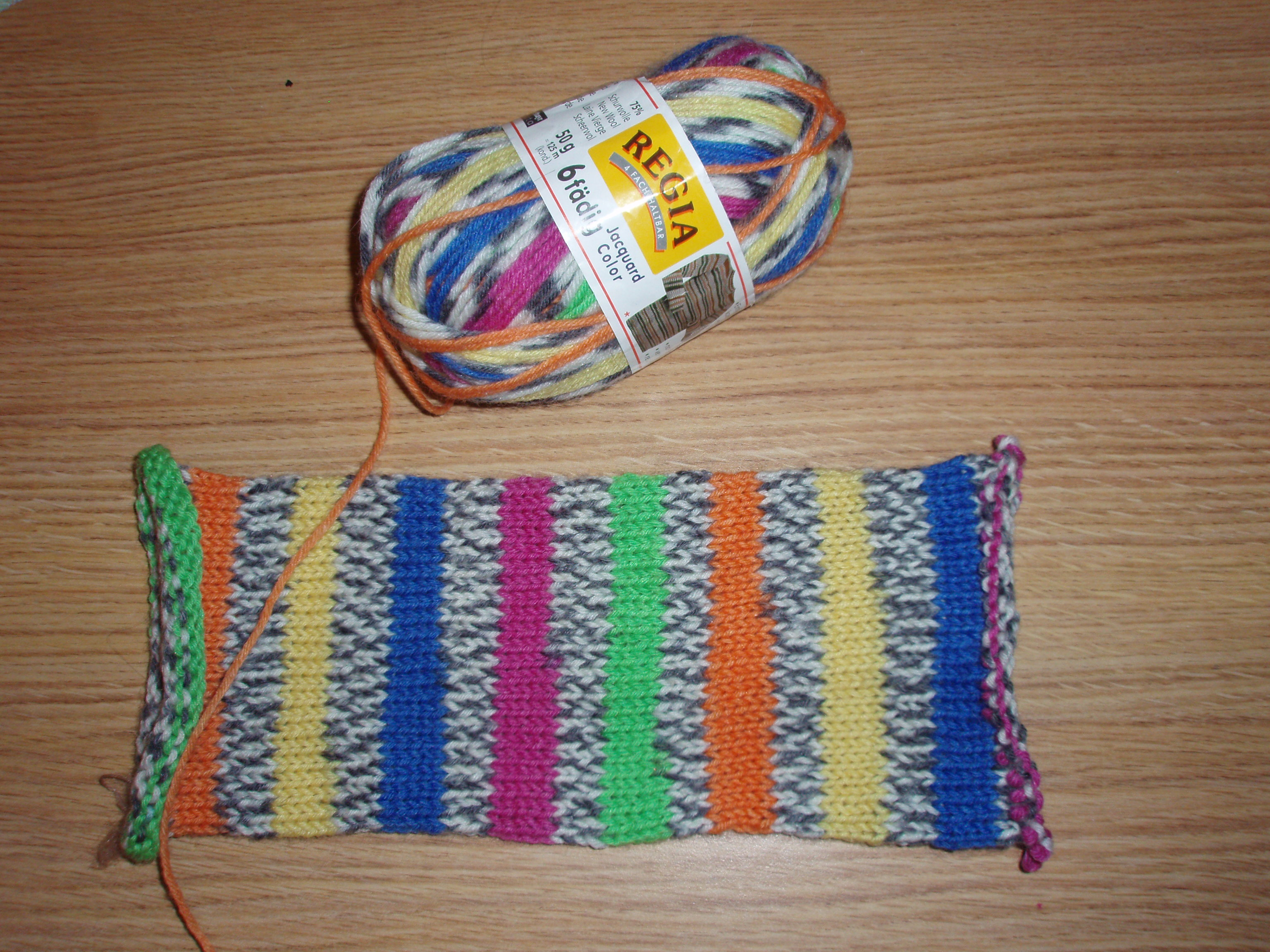
Self-striping variegated yarn is frequently used in sock knitting

Variegated yarn is yarn dyed with more than one colour.

== Objective ==
It can produce effects that vary depending on the technique of the crafter, the pattern used, and the frequency of colour change. These effects include "flashing" (lightning-bolt effects) and "pooling" (patchy or marbleized effects). Some yarns (known as "self-striping yarns") are designed to produce stripes when used to knit small items such as socks or mittens.

== Methods ==
In solid dyeing, yarns dyed in one single color, Variegated yarns have more than one color.There are various methods of applying two or more colors, and the most common practice is spray or space dyeing.

=== Space dyeing ===
Space dyeing is a technique of localized color application that produces a unique multicolored effect.

== Use ==
Variegated yarns may be used also in knitting, crocheting, and other textile arts. These variegated colored yarns help in making small fancy items such as braids, etc.

== Gallery ==
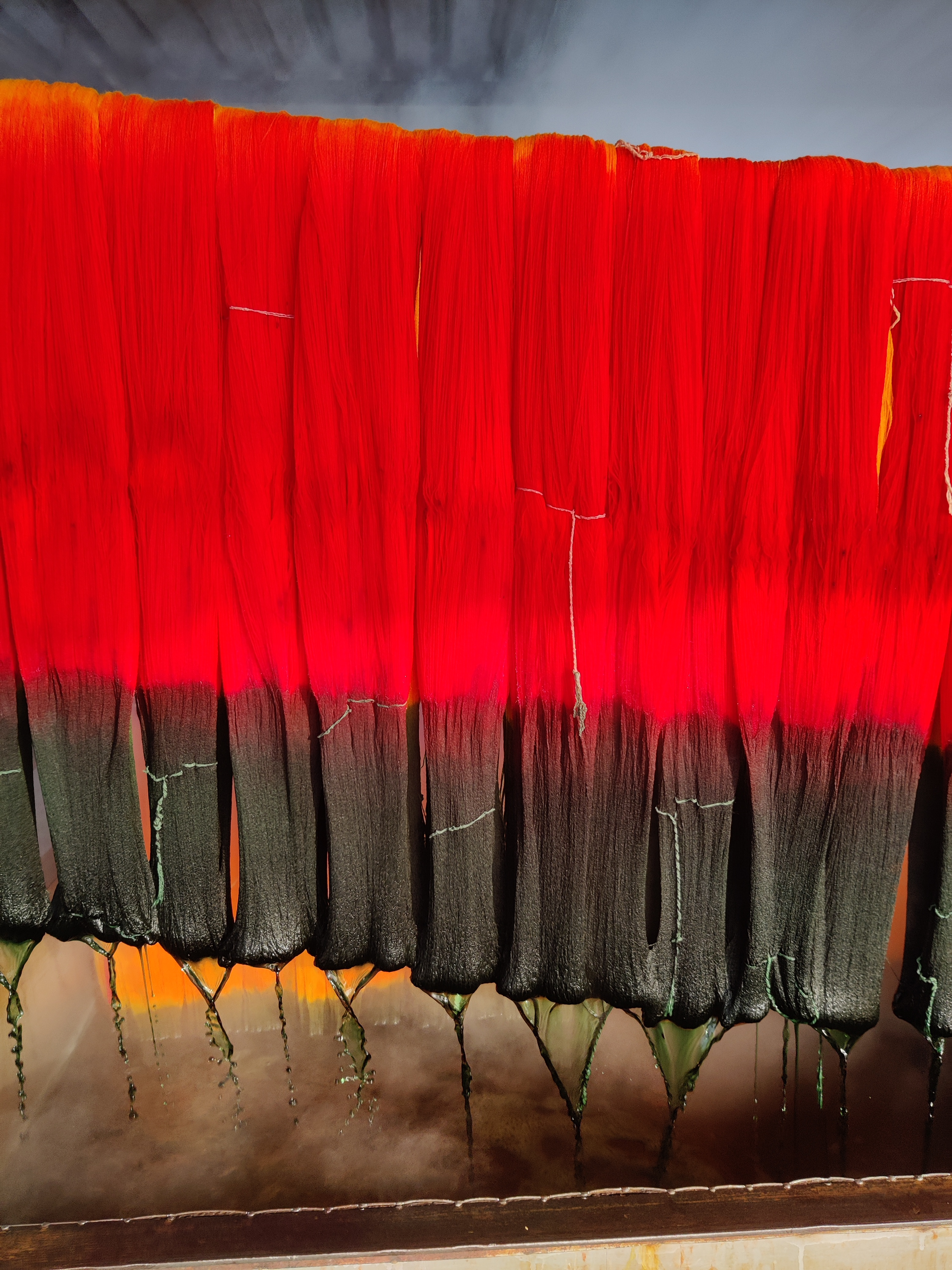
Yarn hanks in the process of dyeing

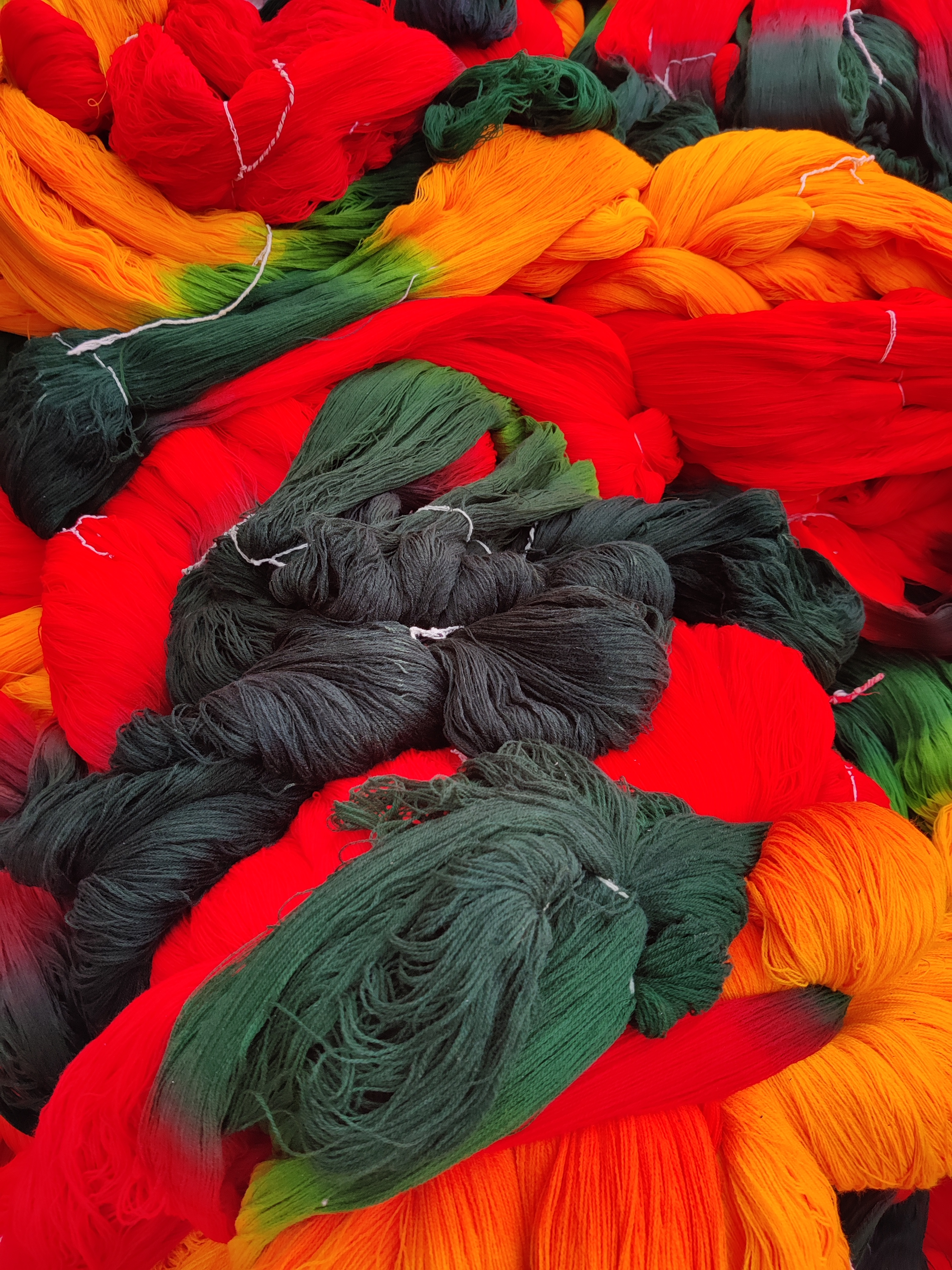
Space dyed yarn

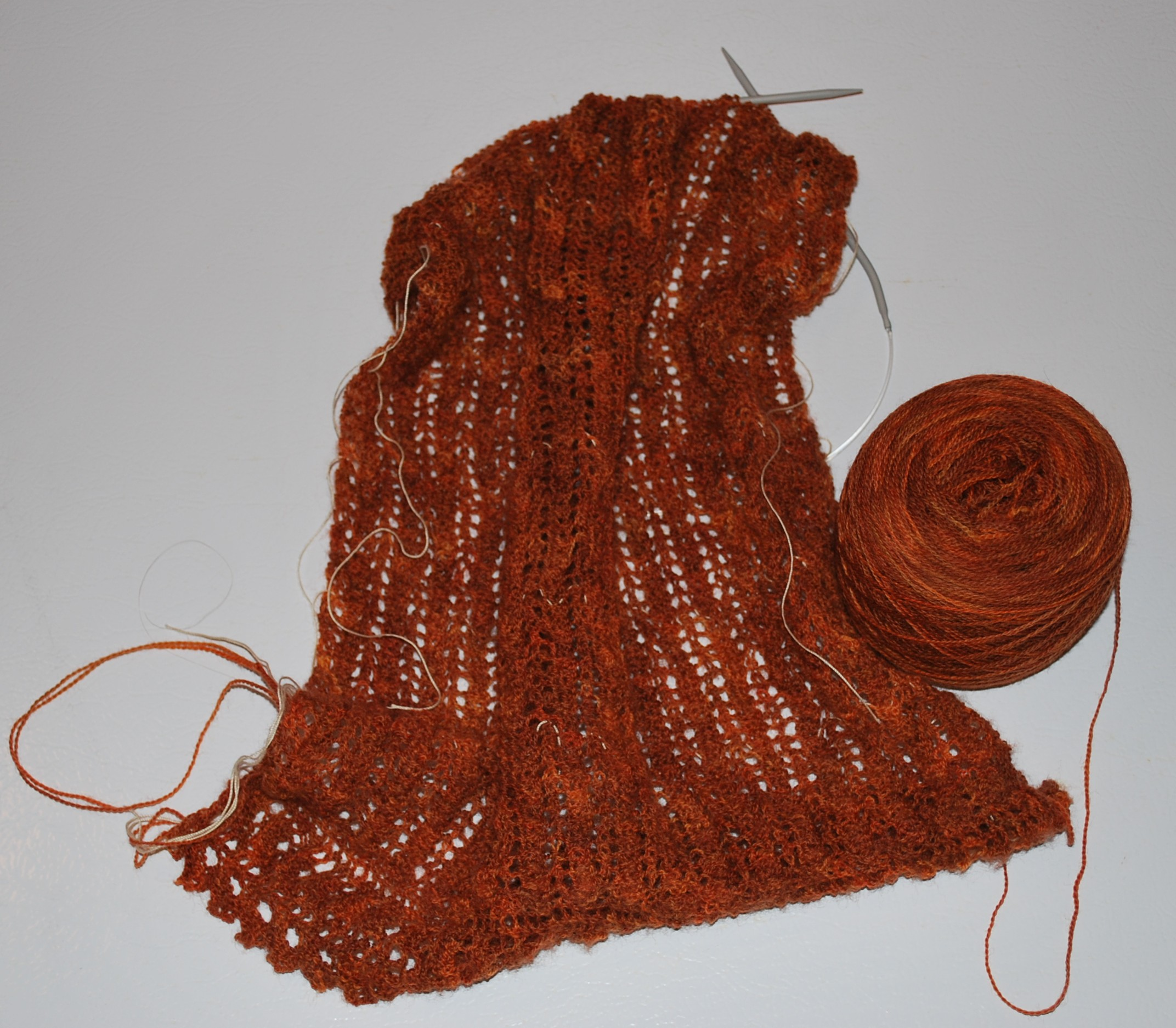
This lace stole is being knitted from variegated laceweight wool

== See also ==
- Yarn
- Dyeing
- Novelty yarns include a wide variety of yarns made with unusual features, structure or fiber composition such as slubs, inclusions, metallic or synthetic fibers, laddering and varying thickness introduced during production.
