= Stitch holder =

Knitting tool

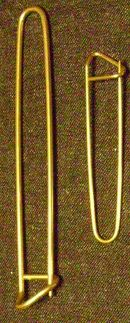
Two stitch holders

Stitch holders are tools that are used in knitting to hold open stitches when not being used by the needles. The two most common types of stitch markers are locking and ring.

They are commonly used when finishing a side of an item, such as a sweater, and preparing for the kitchener stitch. They can be used on stitches separated from the needle when splitting the piece. For example, when shaping the neckhole of a sweater, the stitch holder is placed on the group of stitches used to make the neckhole, and the needles are used to continue to make the stitches on either side. Stitch holders are also used at the ends of sleeves of a sweater before they are attached to the body of the sweater.
