= The Knitting Guild Association =

Large US knitting association

The Knitting Guild Association (TKGA) is the largest knitting association in the United States, founded in 1984. Since the founding of the Master Hand Knitting Program in 1987, there have been 406 Master Hand Knitters worldwide who have earned their certification by successfully completing all three levels of the program. Since 2016, TKGA has been operated as a 501c3 non-profit organization run by master knitters to support knitters worldwide. Their educational outreach is conducted through correspondence-style courses that include mini classes, educational courses, certification programs and through in-person retreats and virtual knitting conferences.

The Knitting Guild Association is led by a board of directors consisting of 7 Certified Master Knitters. Arenda Holladay, President of the board and executive director, also serves as editor of Cast On Magazine. Cast On is published in digital format four times a year for members and is known for its technical articles and patterns that highlight knitting techniques.
