= Welting (knitting) =

Technique in knitting

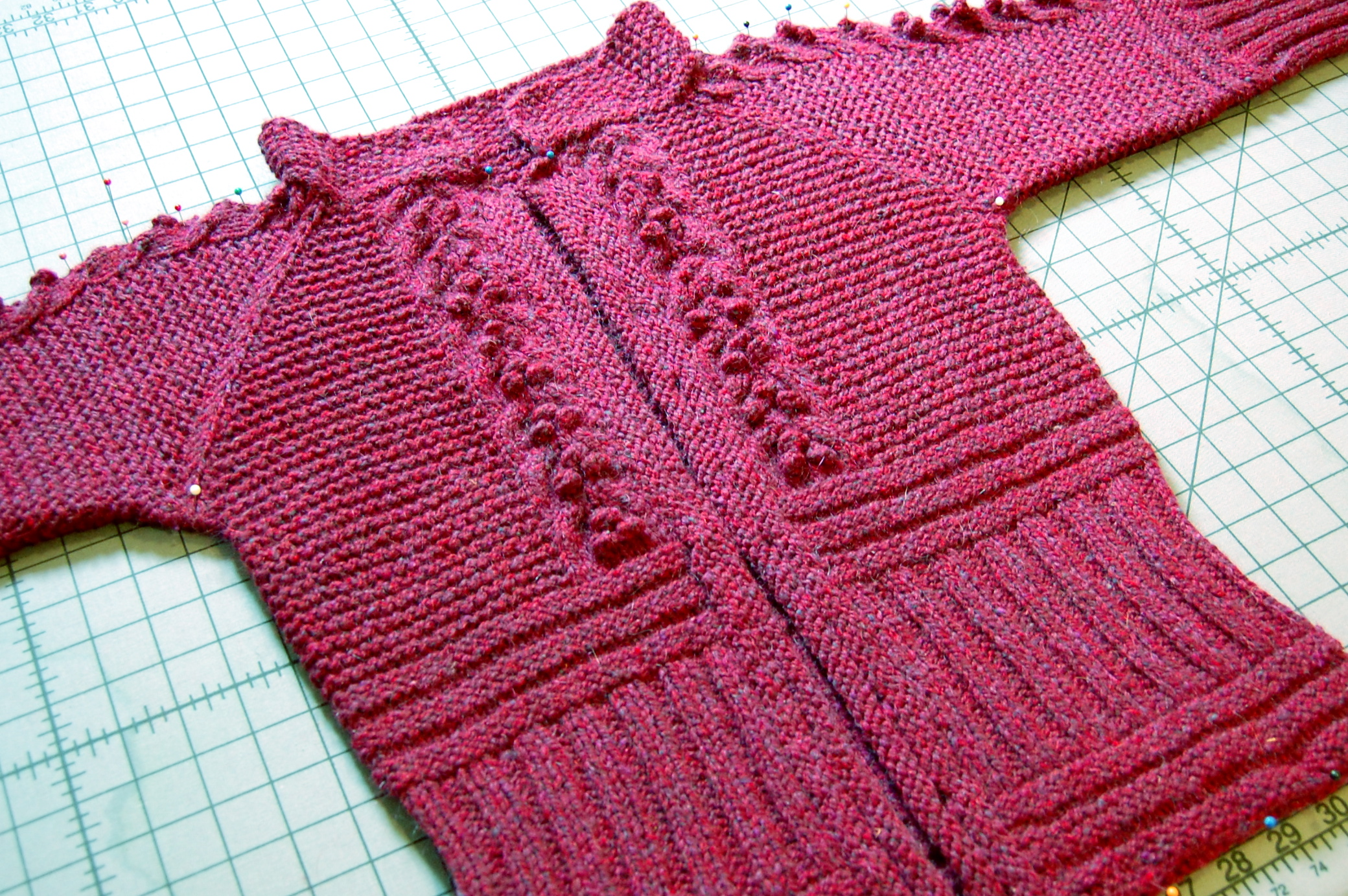
Several types of welting are knit into the front of this jacket, including horizontal ribbing, bobbles and garter stitching.

In knitting, welting is the horizontal analog of ribbing; that is, one or more horizontal rows of knit stitches alternating with one or more rows of purl stitches.

The simplest welting is garter stitch, in which knit rows alternate with purl rows. If the fabric is produced "in the round", the effect is simply produced by knitting one row, then purling the next. If the fabric is being knit back-and-forth, turned after every row, the effect is produced even more simply by knitting each row—first from the right side, then from the wrong side.

Similar to ribbing, a welting pattern can be specified by the number of knit rows followed by the number of purl rows, e.g., 1x1 welting is garter stitch. Many complicated patterns of purely horizontal stripes are possible, which can be worked in yarns of different color, thickness and texture for added visual interest, e.g., wide stripes of red chenille alternating with narrow stripes of black worsted wool.

Welts can be decorated with nearly any motif used for a plain knitted fabric, e.g., bobbles, lace, and various colors. However, cables cannot be made horizontally; if desired, cables must be worked as a separate piece.

== Tuck stitches ==
A variation of welting is the creation of tuck stitches. A tuck can be created when a previous row is knit together, stitch by stitch, with the present row. This forms a round ridge that projects outwards from the face of the fabric, and is used as a decorative detail.

Tuck stitches are created by working in hand knitting by working into the stitch immediately below the next stitch waiting on the needle. When the new stitch is slid off the needle, the ignored, unworked stitch unfolds, creating what is sometimes called a 'shawl' or 'brioche' stitch. This is the tuck, and it drapes across the top of the old stitch which forces its legs outwards. Due to this behaviour, tuck fabric tends to work up wider than the same number of stitches in stocking stitch, whilst the same number of rows will produce a slightly shorter length of fabric than in stocking stitch. Tuck stitches are generally not worked next to each other unless there is a purl stitch between, such as on a rib pattern, otherwise the tuck loops will just create long floats. On stocking stitch there should be at least one plain stitch between tuck stitches. Several tuck stitches spaced along a row, or placed vertically above each other will create decorative effects, textural effects in single colour and decorative patterns when worked in conjunction with colour stripes. Tuck stitches worked on the knit stitches of every row of a rib fabric, are the basis of Brioche Stitch (also called English Rib or Full Cardigan Stitch in machine knitting). These fabric demonstrate the way in which the tucks open up the stitches width-wise, look the same on both sides, and are quite unstable as the tucks rob yarn from each other. If tucks are worked on every knit stitch of rib fabric, but only on alternate rows, this will produce Royal Rib, also known as Half Cardigan Stitch. This fabric has a different appearance on each side, but is more stable than those discussed above.
