= Decrease (knitting) =

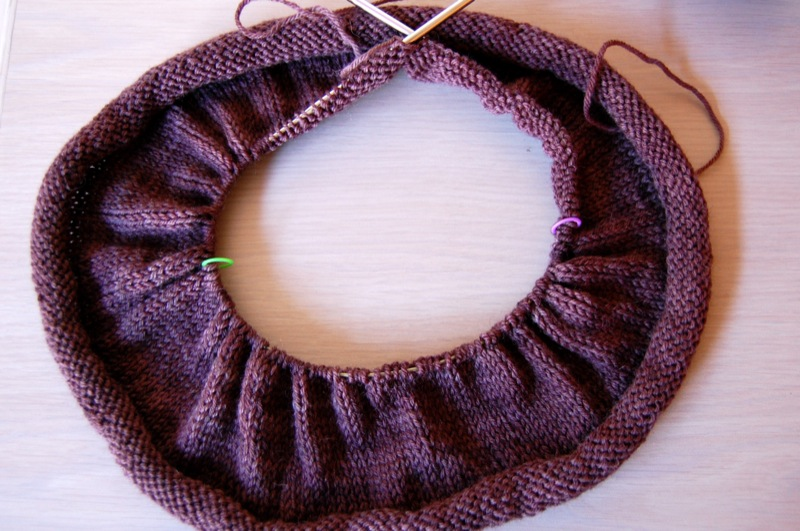
Shown is the first row of decrease stitches knit into a sweater to create gathering.

A decrease in knitting is a reduction in the number of stitches, usually accomplished by suspending the stitch to be decreased from another existing stitch or by knitting it together with another stitch.

== Methods of single decreasing (knitting) ==
When more than one stitch is suspended from a stitch, they can hang in different orders. For example, the first stitch could be on top of the second stitch (when seen from the right side) or the reverse, leaning to the left or the right. The order of stitches is important, both for appearance and for the way it pulls the fabric.

- K2tog ("knit two together") – Work to the two stitches to be decreased, insert the right-hand needle into the first two stitches as if to knit, wrap yarn around needle in normal manner, slip the two stitches off together and drop them. This creates a right-leaning decrease.
- K2tog-L ("knit two together - left") – A left-leaning decrease that is the mirror of K2tog and produces a neater finish than other left-leaning decreases such as SSK. The key to making this stitch work is to pull excess yarn from the second stitch before letting it drop off the needle.
- SSK ("slip, slip, knit") – Work to the two stitches to be decreased, slip two stitches one at a time to the right-hand needle, as if to knit; insert the left-hand needle into the two stitches from front to back, knit the two stitches together and drop them. This creates a left-leaning decrease.
- S1, K1, PSSO ("slip one, knit one, pass slipped stitch over") – This results in a similar look to the SSK but can appear less tidy. Work to the two stitches to be decreased, slip next stitch to the right-hand needle as if to knit, knit next stitch, pass slipped stitch over knit stitch. Also creates a left-leaning decrease.
- K2tog tbl ("knit two together through the back loops") – This looks similar to the SSK or S1, K, PSSO, but is faster to work. Work to the two stitches to be decreased, then insert the right hand needle into the backs of the next two stitches (i.e. behind the left-hand needle, such that the two needles are anti-parallel in the stitches). Wrap the yarn normally and slip the two stitches off the left needle. This makes a left-leaning decrease.

== Methods of double decreasing (knitting) ==
Sometimes a double decrease is made, in which three stitches are suspended from a single stitch. This allows for six possible stitch orders: 123, 132, 213, 231, 312 and 321. Here, the first number is the topmost stitch, and the last number is the bottommost stitch. Thus, 213 means that the second stitch is uppermost (as seen from the right side), followed by the first, then third stitches. The uppermost stitch is most important; there is not much visual difference between 213 and 231.

The simplest double decreases are k3tog and p3tog, which both slant to the right. An attractively symmetric double decrease is 213, which can be done as follows: slip stitches 1 and 2 knitwise simultaneously, knit stitch 3, then pass the slipped stitches over the just-knitted stitch.

== Relation to binding off ==
Binding off is effectively a series of adjacent decreases.

The simplest binding off method is to pass each knitted loop over the loop next to it. The final loop is secured by passing the knitting yarn through it, so it is best to start at the point furthest from the knitting yarn. This makes a tight edge, in contrast to other binding off methods that have a tendency to flare out. This method also does not require that the knitting yarn be nearby, so it can be done at any time or position, e.g., to form button holes.

The next simplest binding off is successive k2tog or p2tog stitches, or their counterparts k2tog tbl and p2tog tbl. In all these cases, the knitted stitch is returned to the left needle, to be combined with the following stitch.

== Role in fabric shaping ==
Decreases are useful in shaping the edges of knitted pieces, and also in creating surface curvature in pieces, e.g., by creating darts.
