= Entrelac =

Knitting technique used to create a textured diamond pattern

Entrelac is a knitting technique used to create a textured diamond pattern. While the result resembles basket-woven strips of knitted fabric, the actual material comprises interconnected squares on two different orientations.

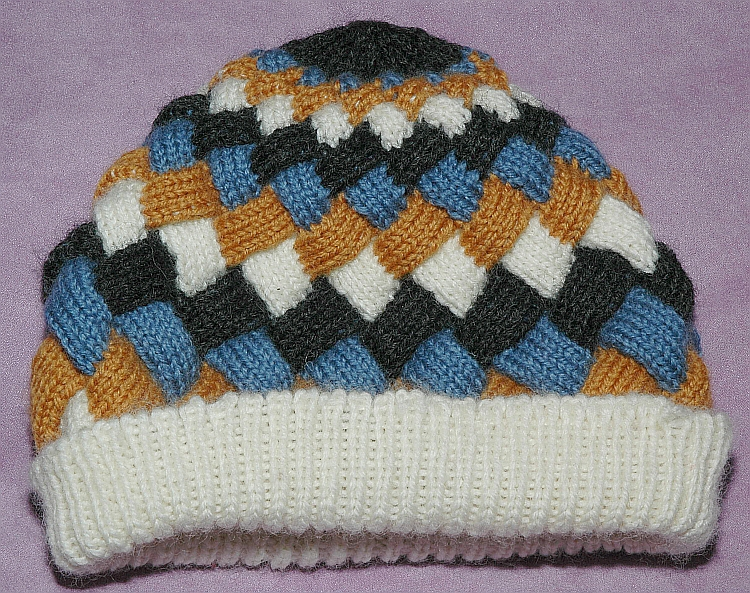
Hat knit using entrelac, in four colors

Unlike many textured knitting techniques, entrelac allows for colorwork as well. Though single-color entrelac is the norm, it is often used to create colored patterns. The use of variegated yarn with long color repeats for entrelac has become commonplace, since careful use can create distinct squares of color with only one yarn. Entrelac can be knit flat (back-and-forth) or in the round for a cylinder, as for the hat at right. However, unlike typical round knitting, the knitting is turned after a full round of squares so the next set is knitted in the opposite direction.

== Method ==
Knitting entrelac requires only the knit and purl stitches, the ability to "k2tog" and "p2tog" (knit or purl two stitches together), and to pick up stitches. Entrelac can be done entirely in garter stitch, although stockinette is more common.

A characteristic aspect of entrelac is that a "row" of knitting actually contains many smaller "rows" within the squares. Squares within a row (for instance, the first set of blue squares in the hat above) are knitted in sequence and then topped with a new row of squares (black squares in the example above). The knitter picks up stitches along the side edge of an existing square and knits along them, knitting or purling two together as needed each time they reach the live stitches along the top of the neighboring square. Because of the picked-up stitches, the back of stockinette entrelac is generally less regular than the front, as seen in the photo to the left.

Wrong-side detail of scarf in entrelac, four colors

For garments and projects requiring square edges, the entrelac is ringed in triangles, knit in the same way as the squares but with increases and decreases. A row of triangles is the typical starting point for an entrelac project, though they can also be started with connected squares, as in the scarf to the left, which was knit from side to side starting with the white row.

Entrelac fabric is often felted to create the illusion of an intarsia argyle pattern; the felting flattens the entrelac texture but leaves the different-colored squares, as if the object were knitted in different colors at the same time.

== Other uses ==
The Entrelac technique can also be used in crochet or Tunisian crochet.
