= Alice's Shop =

Gift shop based on Lewis Carroll's Alice franchise

Coordinates: 51.7489°N 1.2568°W

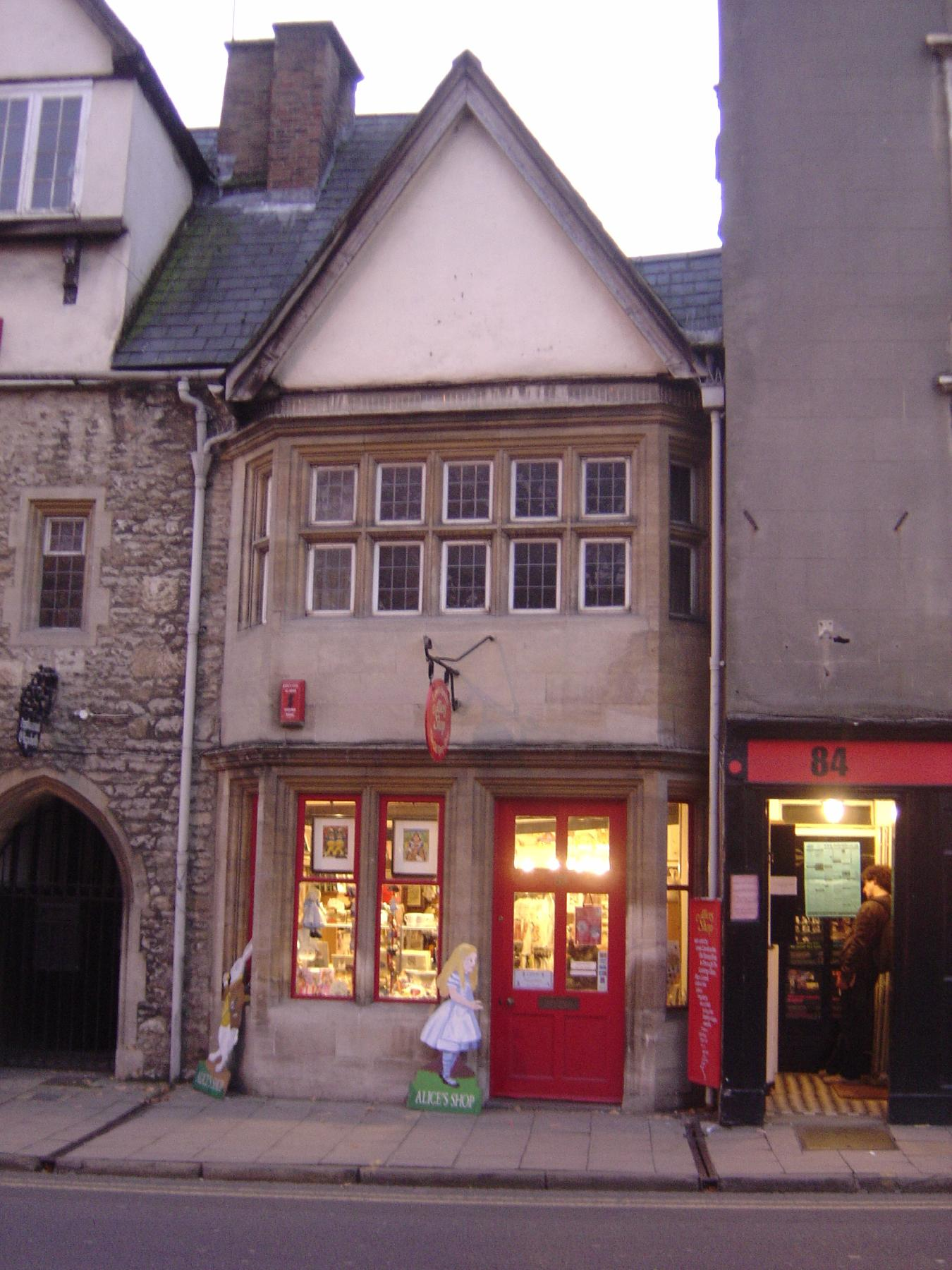
Alice's Shop seen from the east

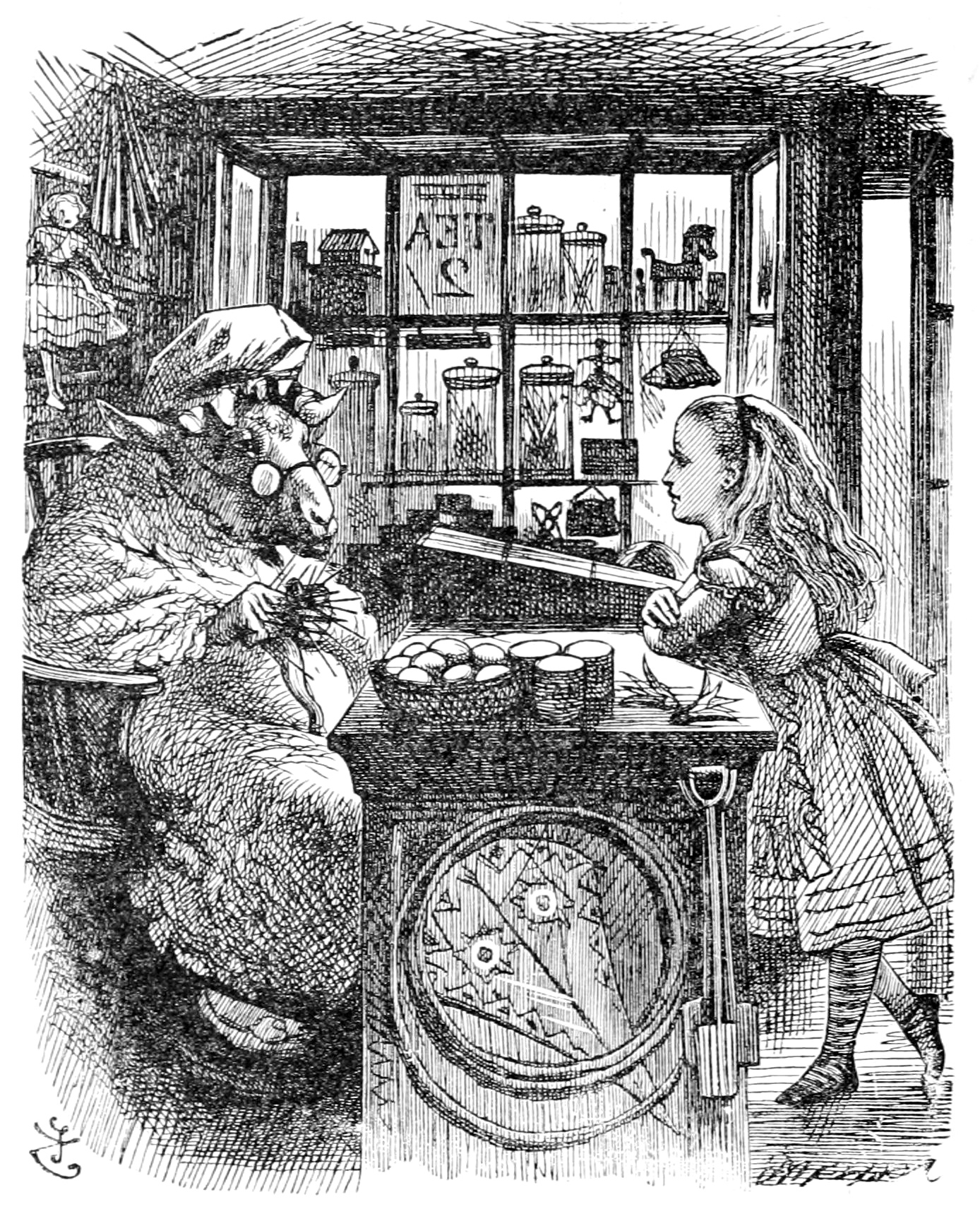
Tenniel's illustration of 'The Old Sheep Shop'. As the book was about a land behind a mirror, Tenniel's picture is a mirror image of the real shop.

Alice's Shop is a shop at 83 St Aldate's, Oxford, England. With 82 St Aldate's next door it is part of a stone-built 15th-century house that was remodelled in the 17th century. It is now a gift shop selling gifts, souvenirs and memorabilia, all based on Alice.

83 St Aldate's has long been a shop. In the Victorian era its customers included Alice Liddell, daughter of Henry Liddell, who was Dean of Christ Church, Oxford, which is opposite the shop. Alice, who used to buy sweets at the shop, was the inspiration for Lewis Carroll's 1865 novel Alice's Adventures in Wonderland and its 1871 sequel Through the Looking-Glass.

82 and 83 St Aldate's were built in the 15th century. Early in the 17th century they were remodelled. 83 St Aldate's has a gabled front with a 17th-century bay window on the first floor. On its north side 83 has a blocked 17th-century window. Together 82 and 83 St Aldate's are a Grade II* listed building.

== The Old Sheep Shop ==
Lewis Carroll featured the shop as the Old Sheep Shop in his 1871 novel Through the Looking-Glass. One of John Tenniel's original illustrations for the book shows the inside of the shop. Carroll used it as a setting in Chapter 5 of the book (Wool and Water) and is owned by a sheep in the story:

"She looked at the Queen, who seemed to have suddenly wrapped herself up in wool. Alice rubbed her eyes, and looked again. She couldn't make out what had happened at all. Was she in a shop? And was that really – was it really a sheep that was sitting on the other side of the counter? Rub as she could, she could make nothing more of it: she was in a little dark shop, leaning with her elbows on the counter, and opposite to her was an old Sheep, sitting in an arm-chair knitting, and every now and then leaving off to look at her through a great pair of spectacles."

The shop is characteristic of the dream-like qualities in the Looking-Glass world, in that every time Alice tries to focus on a specific object on its many shelves it changes shape and shifts to another shelf. At another point the shop itself vanishes and Alice finds herself outside with the sheep in a boat, having been given a pair of knitting needles which turn into oars in her hands. The sheep herself continues to make scornful, personal remarks and then finally, on appearing back in the shop, sells Alice an egg, which promptly turns into Humpty Dumpty.

On leaving the shop at the end of the chapter, Alice says:

"Well, this is the very queerest shop I ever saw!"
