= Steek =

Knitting technique

In knitting, steeking is a technique or shortcut used to knit garments such as sweaters in the round without interruption for openings or sleeves until the end. After completing a tube, a straight line is cut along the centre of a column of stitches, in order to make room for an opening or place to attach another piece. The steek itself is a bridge of extra stitches, in which the cut is made, and is usually 6-10 stitches wide. This technique was developed by the knitters of Shetland and is associated with Fair Isle sweaters, although it can be used for solid colours as well.

== Process ==
After the steek is cut, the edges are tacked down on the wrong side of the fabric in order to create a neat finishing, or the adjacent stitches are sewn or crocheted together to prevent unraveling. The stitches can also be picked up and knit from, for example, to create a sleeve. Alternatively, a sleeve can be made separately and sewn onto the steek. After the garment with a steek has been worn and washed a few times, the facings will felt and become durable finishes on the inside of the garment.

Steeks can be used for front openings (such as on a cardigan), armholes, or necklines. It has several advantages: Many knitters are faster at the knit stitch than the purl stitch, it goes faster, and allows one to work with the right side of the fabric facing the knitter all the time, and thus follow an intricate pattern more easily. It is also easier to maintain an even tension and, as the colour changes can be hidden, there are fewer ends to weave in.

Steeking can be done with crochet as well as using knitting.

In general, there is little risk of unravelling the sweater with a steek cut if the sewn or crocheted line has been done with wool yarn that is not superwash. They can be further strengthened by using a sticky hairy animal yarn (Shetland wool, the traditional choice, is a good example), and using frequent colour changes (such as a 1x1 rib or a check pattern) to secure the yarn. In addition, the sides of the steek can be reinforced by crocheting or sewing.

== Kilts ==
Steeking is also a procedure used in the making of Scottish traditional kilts in which the pleats of the kilt are "steeked," or stabilised, by a line of running stitches made from the wrong side of the fabric, just above the ending line of pleats, or "fell." Steeking is done after cutting extra fabric away at the top of the pleats, and before the kilt is pressed and other finishing elements like lining and buckles are applied.

== Word origins ==
"Steek" or "steeking" means a stitch, to stitch, a knitted loop, or to close, in Scots. It also means "a stitch in sewing, a loop in knitting" in Northumbrian dialect.
