= Circular knitting =

Form of knitting that creates a seamless tube

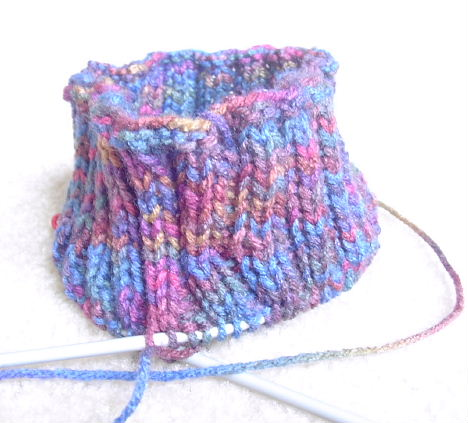
Knitting using a circular needle.

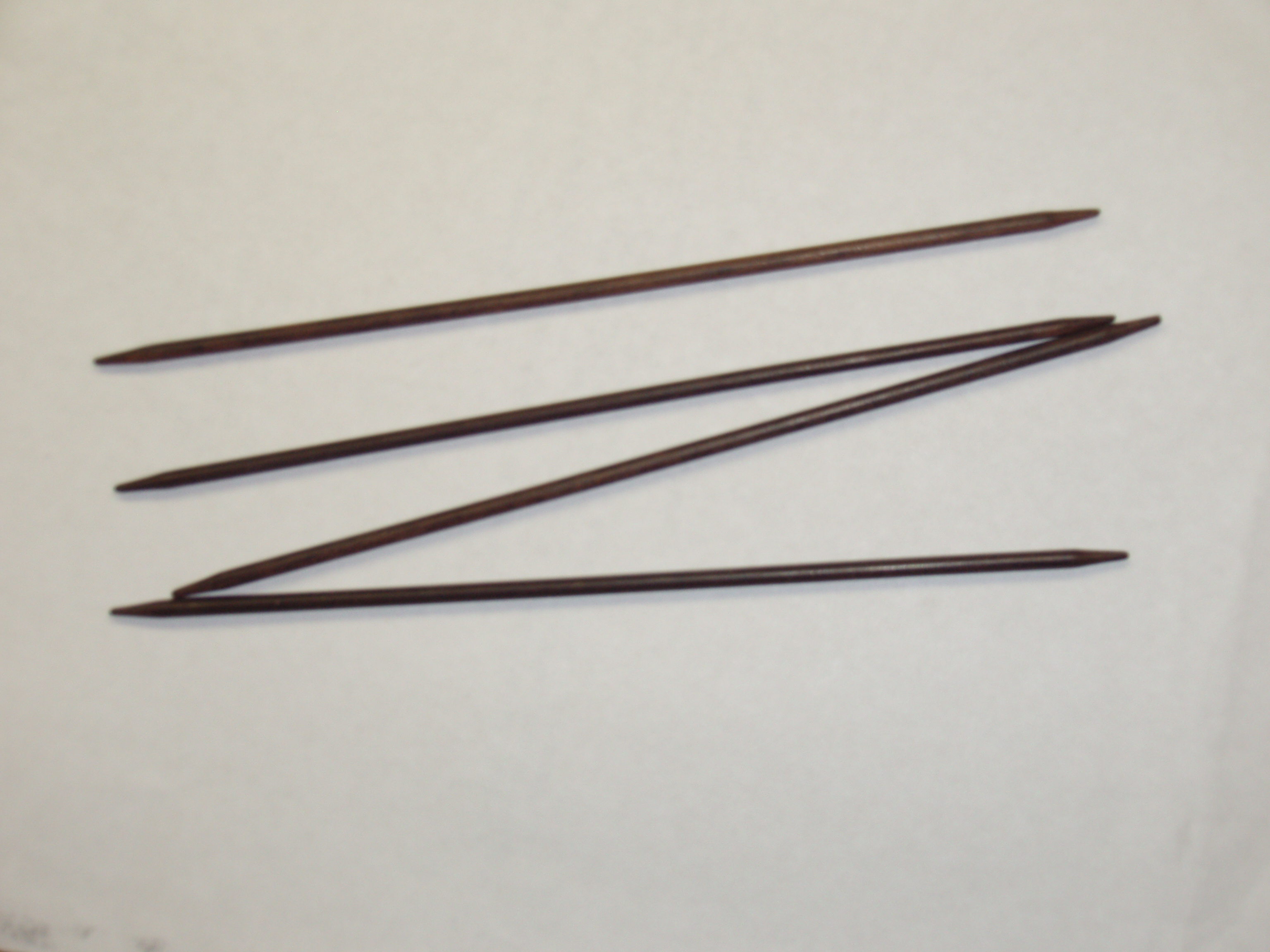
Four double pointed knitting needles.

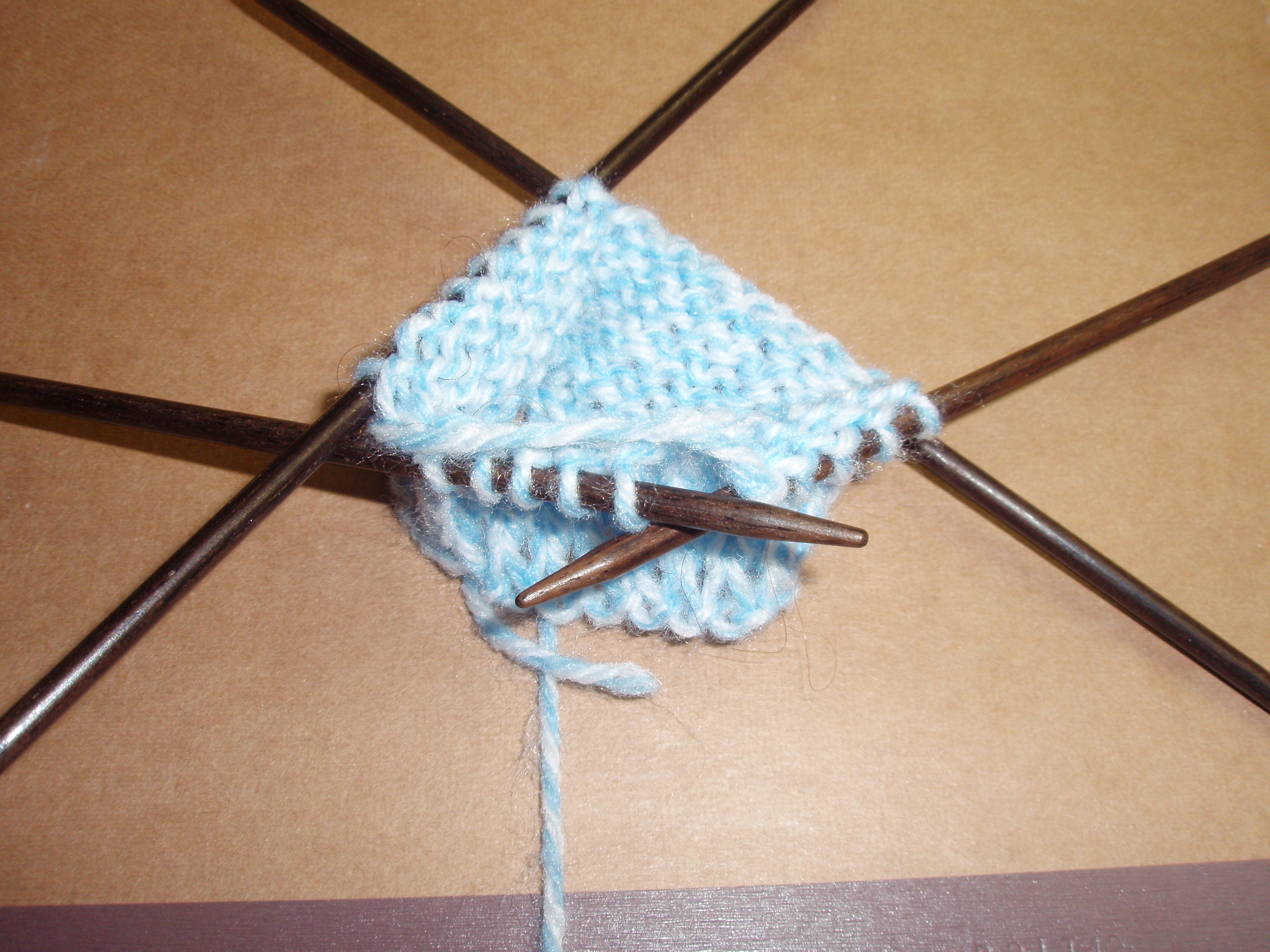
Knitting on double points.

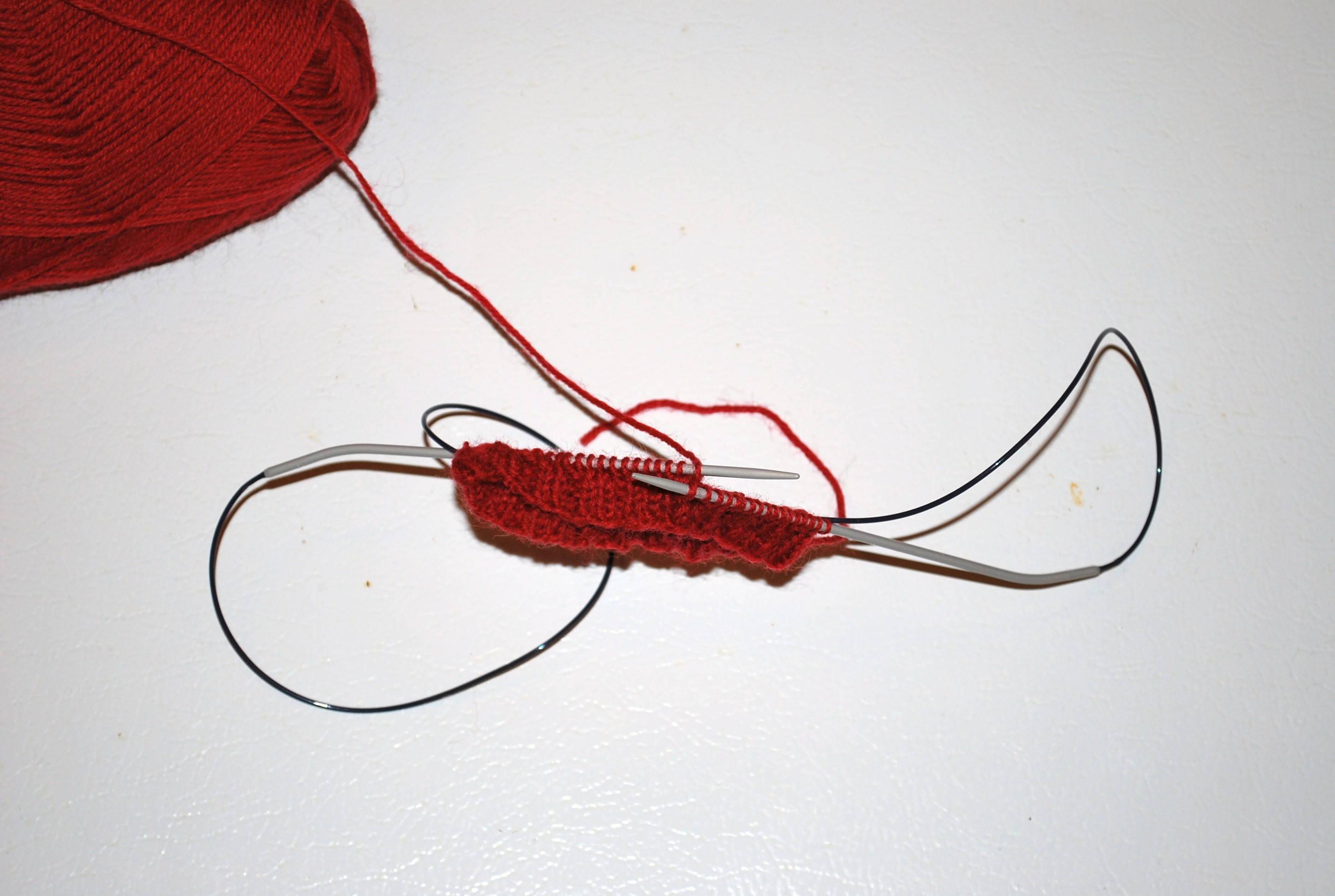
Magic Loop knitting on one circular needle.

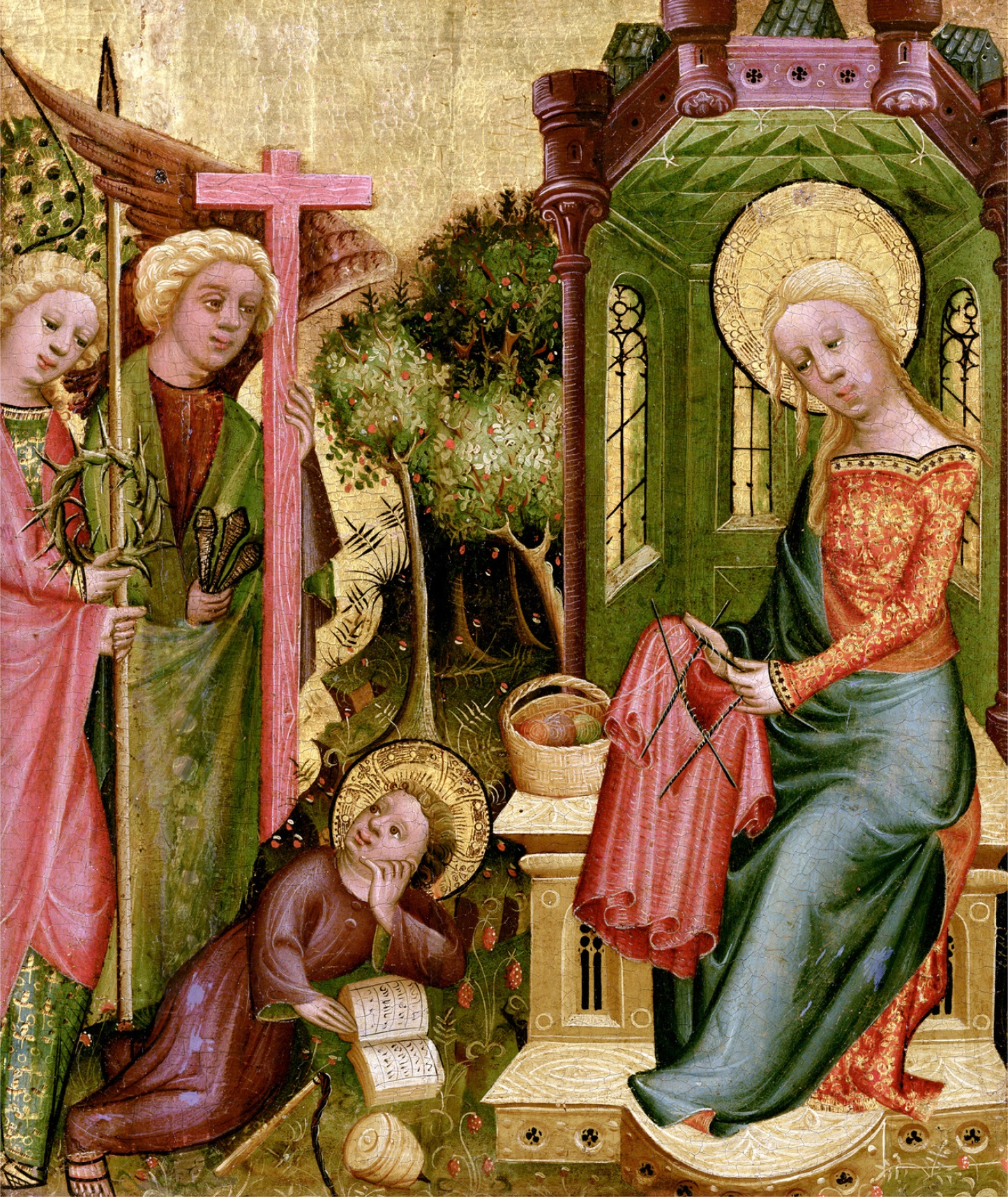
The earliest image of circular knitting, from the 15th century AD.

Circular knitting or knitting in the round is a form of knitting that creates a seamless tube. Work in the round is begun by casting on stitches as for flat knitting but then joining the ends of that row of stitches to form a circle. Knitting is worked in rounds (the equivalent of the rows in flat knitting), which forms the tube by winding around in a helix.

Historically, circular knitting was done using a set of four or five double-pointed needles. Modern knitters may instead use a circular needle, which resembles a pair of short knitting needles connected by a cable between them. Circular knitting can also be performed by knitting machines: a double-bed machine can be set up to knit on its front bed in one direction and then its back bed on the return, which creates the tube. Specialized knitting machines for sock-knitting use individual latch-hook needles to make each stitch in a round frame.

Many types of sweaters are traditionally knit in the round. Planned openings (arm holes, necks, cardigan fronts) are temporarily knitted with extra stitches, reinforced if necessary. Then the extra stitches are cut to create the opening, and are stitched with a sewing machine to prevent unraveling. This technique is called steeking.

== Magic loop technique ==
Invented by Sarah Hauschka and first described in Beverly Galeskas’s booklet The Magic Loop, this technique uses a long circular knitting needle (for instance 40 inches) to knit projects (of any circumference substantially less than the needle length) in the round. The key is pulling a loop of extra cable out between the stitches halfway through the round.

The magic loop technique also allows knitting two-at-a-time projects like pairs of socks or the sleeves of sweaters. This knitting both pieces at once makes it easier to render the two as similar as possible.

== Spool and machine circular knitting ==
Spool knitting is a form of circular knitting using pegs rather than needles, one peg per stitch. A variant automates the stitching action, thus producing a hand-crank circular knitting machine. Commercial knitting machines are heavy-duty powered versions of the hand-cranked ones; they may knit multiple threads at once, for speed.

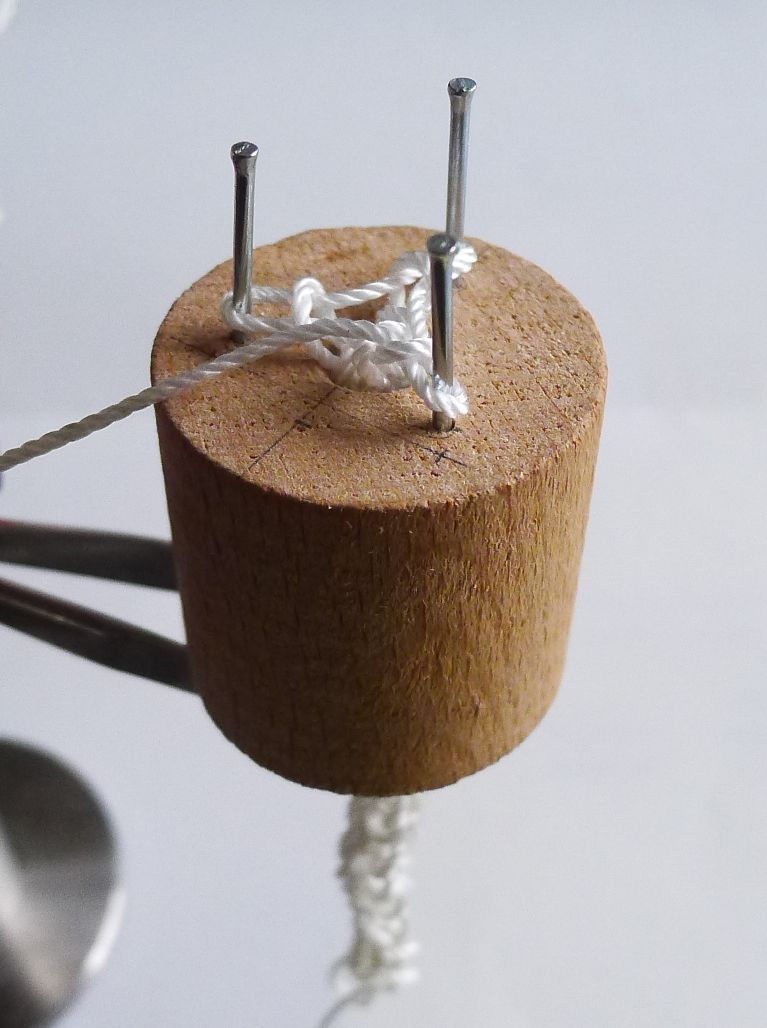
Minimal spool knitting frame

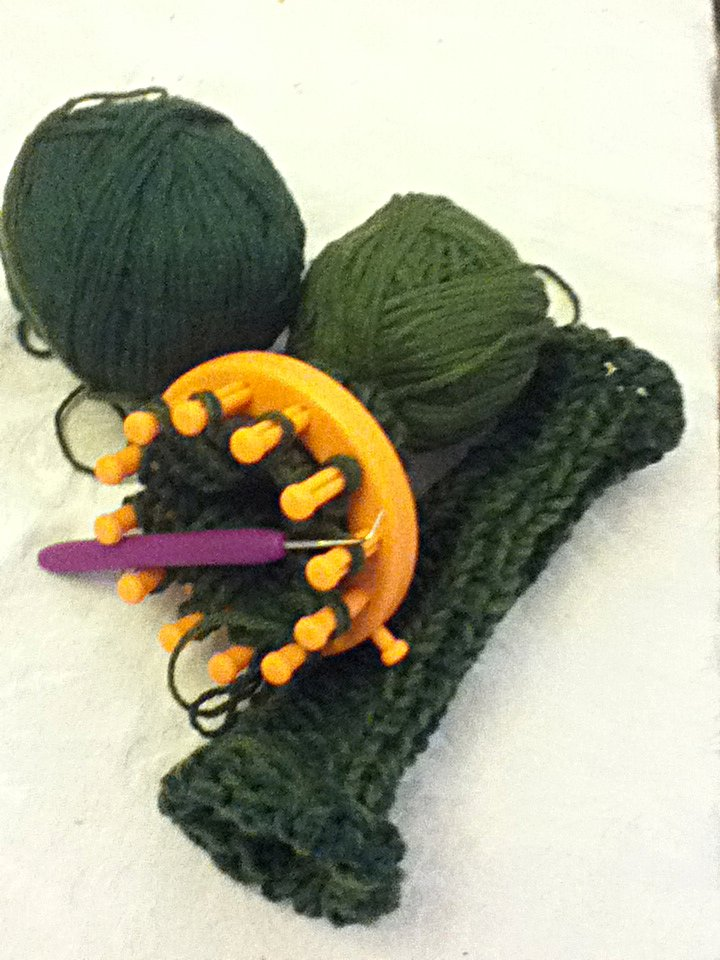
Fingerless gloves being knitted on a 12-peg frame

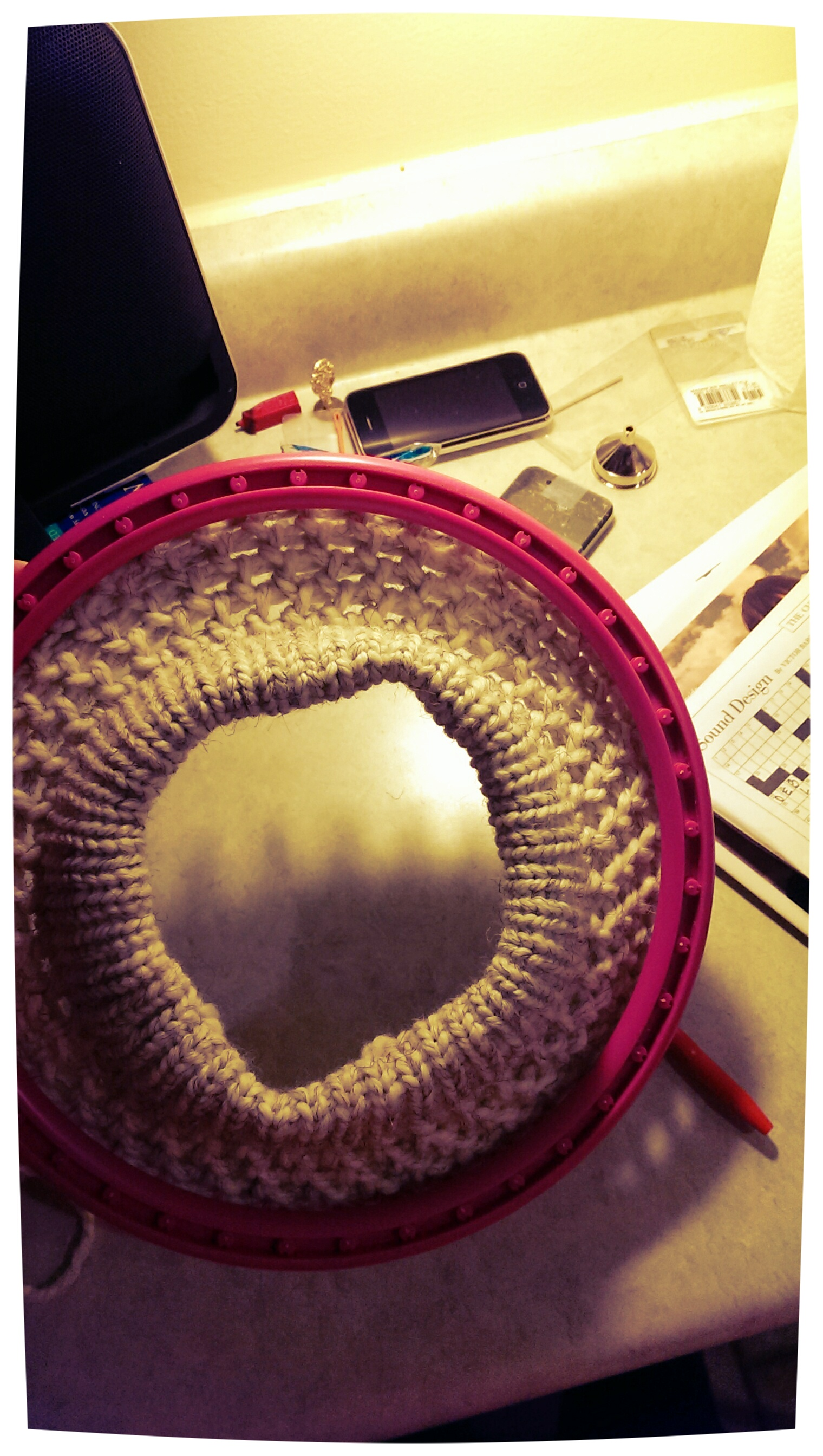
Knitting a tuque (hat) on a larger frame

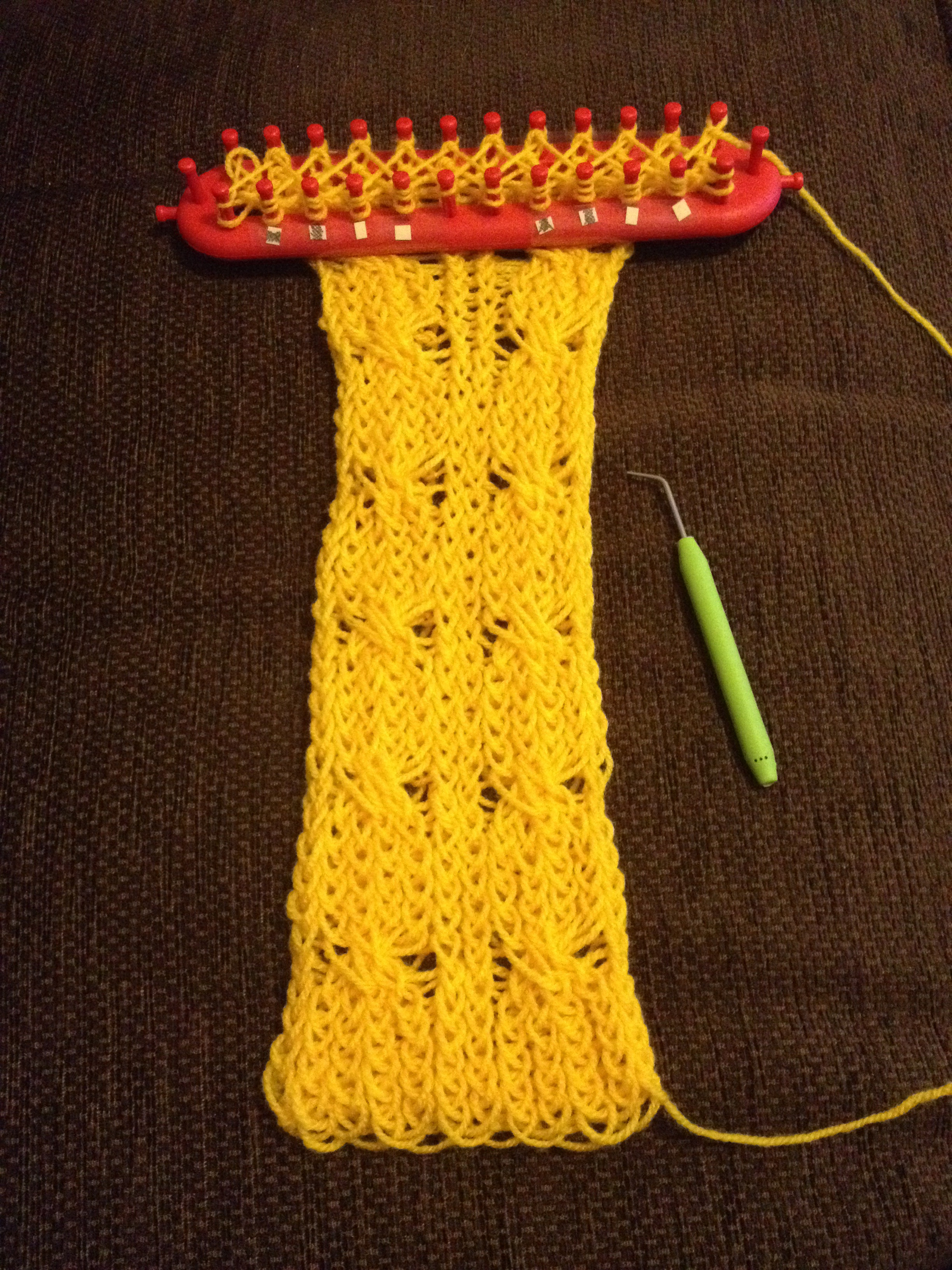
Oblong frame for circular knitting

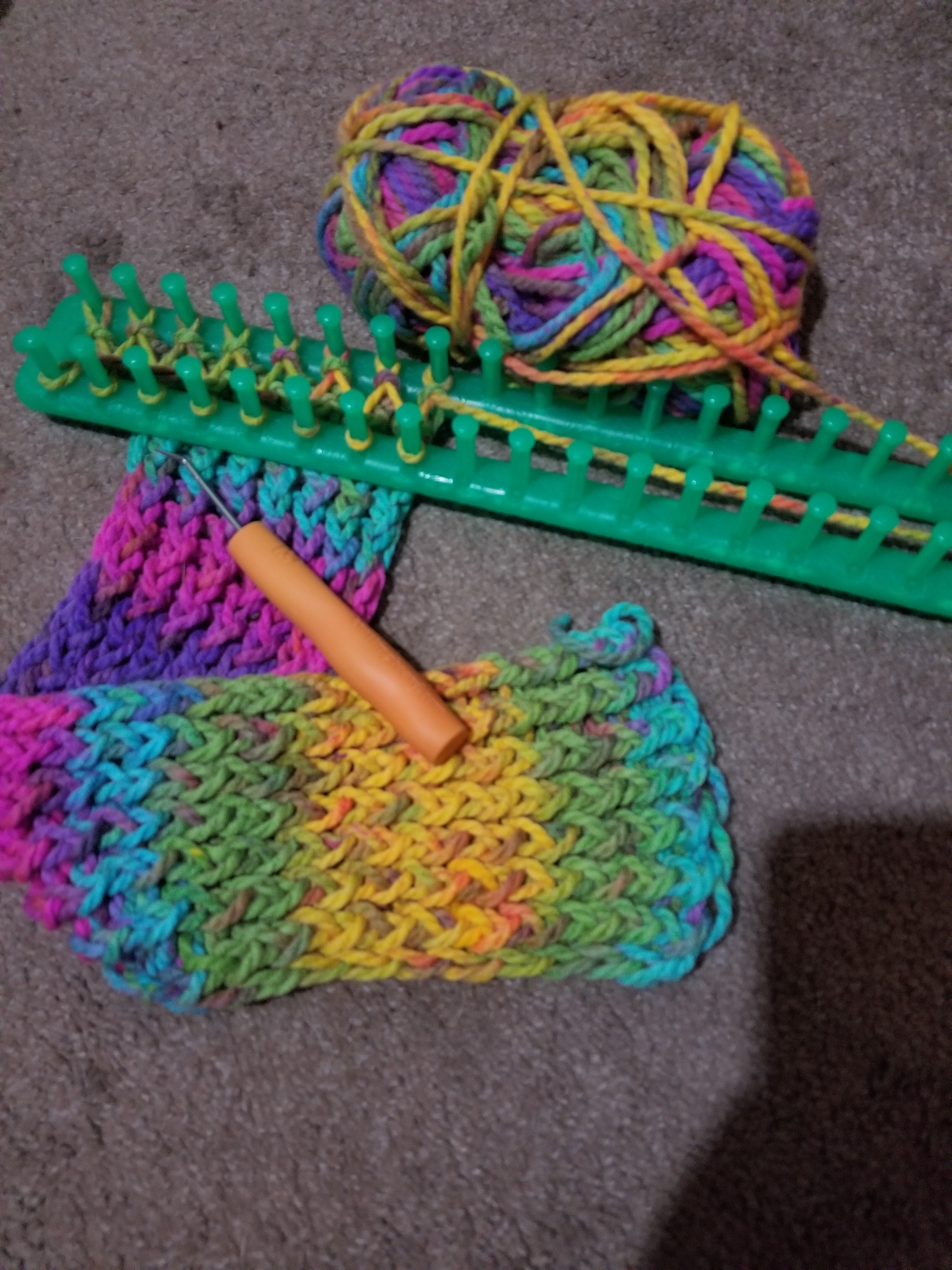
It is not necessary to use the full length of an oblong frame

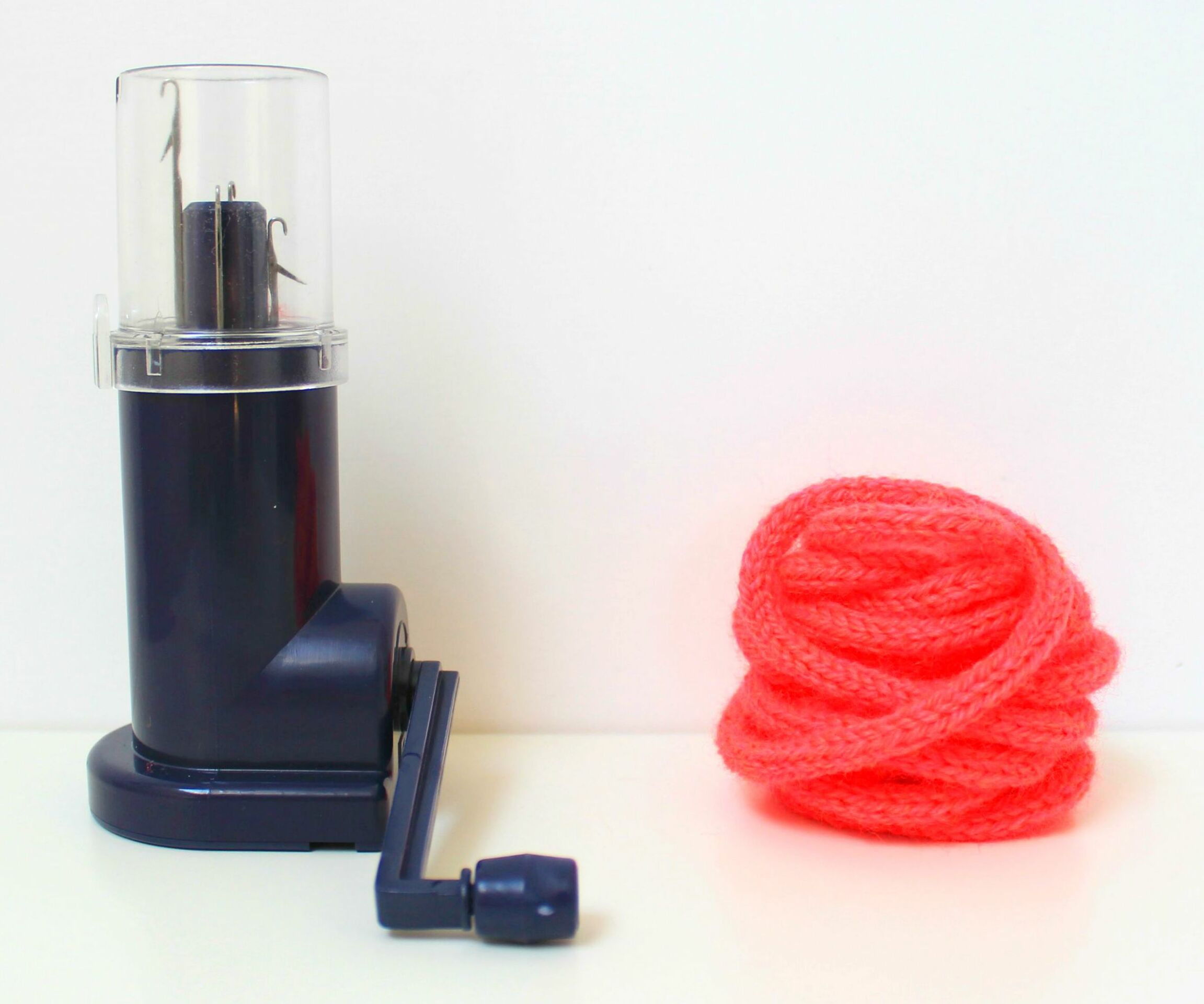
Narrow hand-cranked spool knitting machine

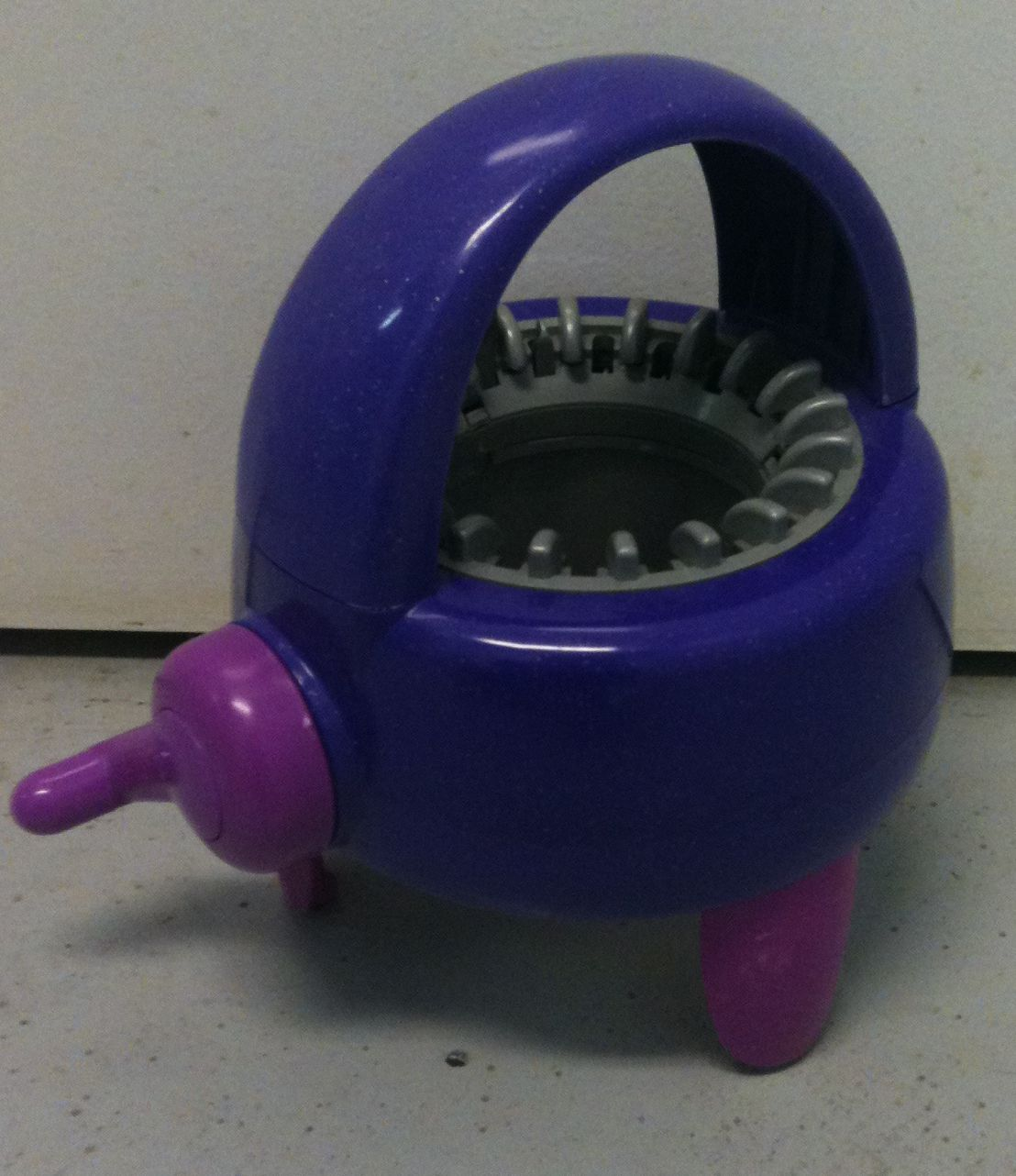
Larger hand-cranked circular knitting machine

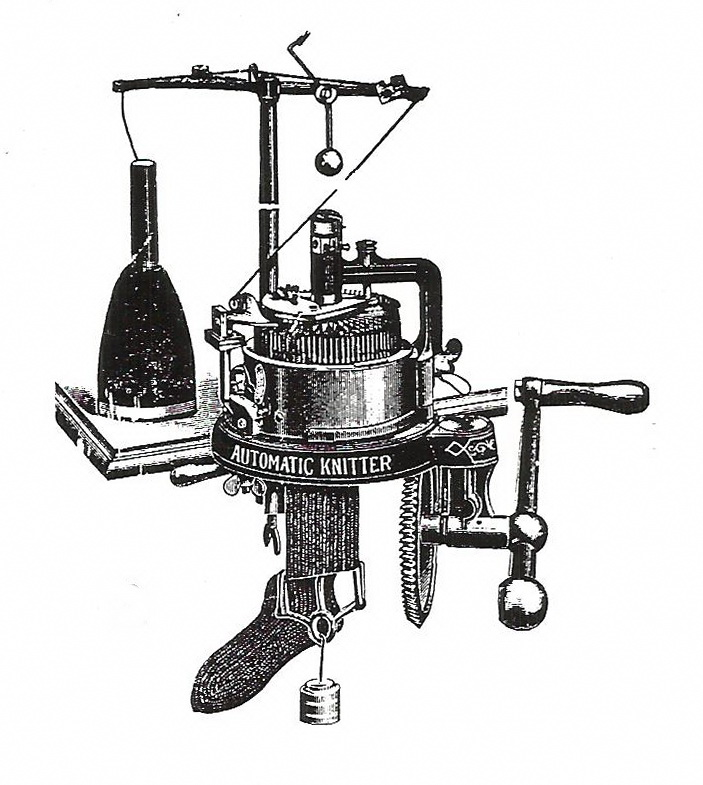
18-hundreds knitting machine, also hand-cranked

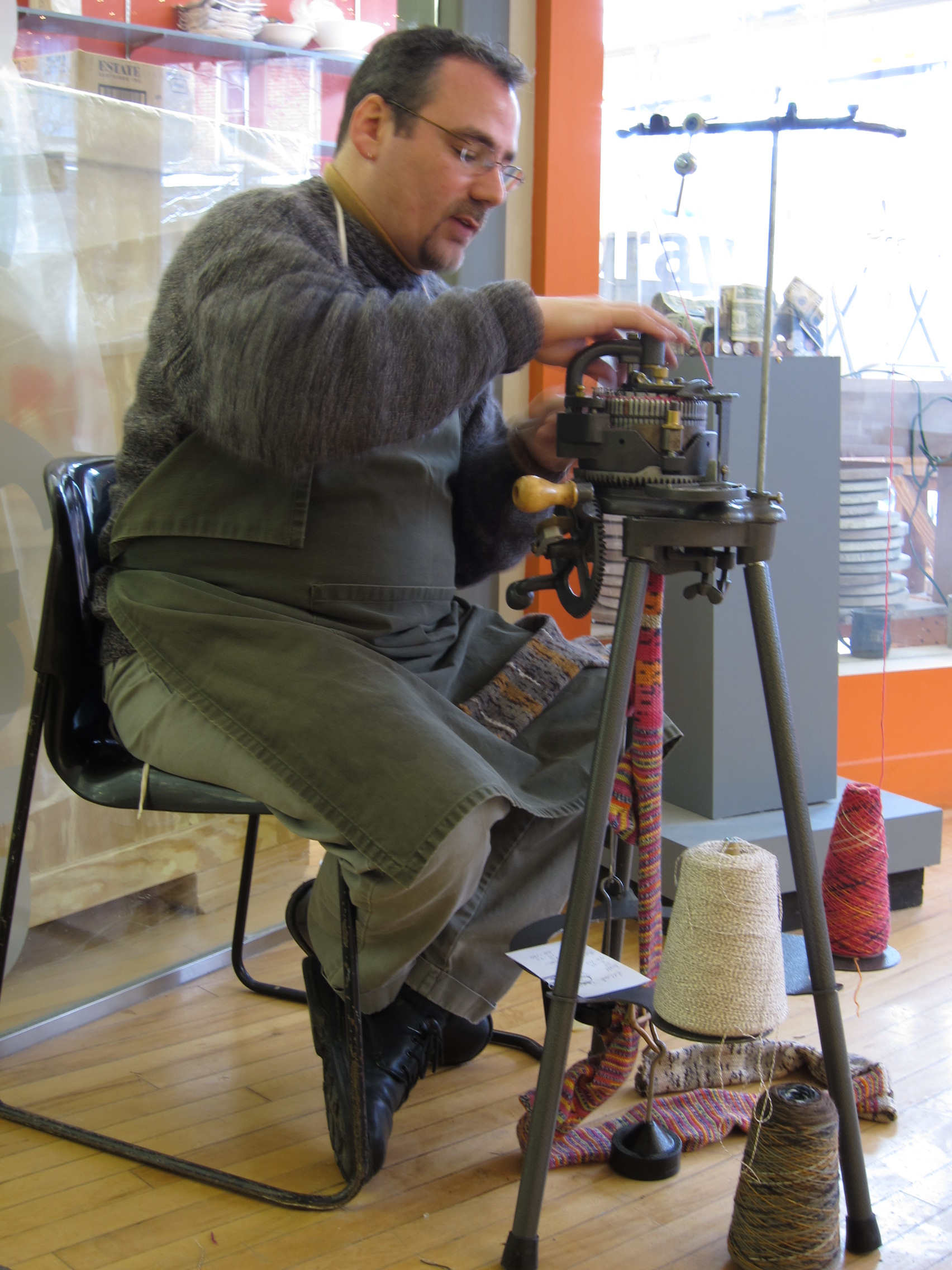
A similar old sock-knitting machine in use

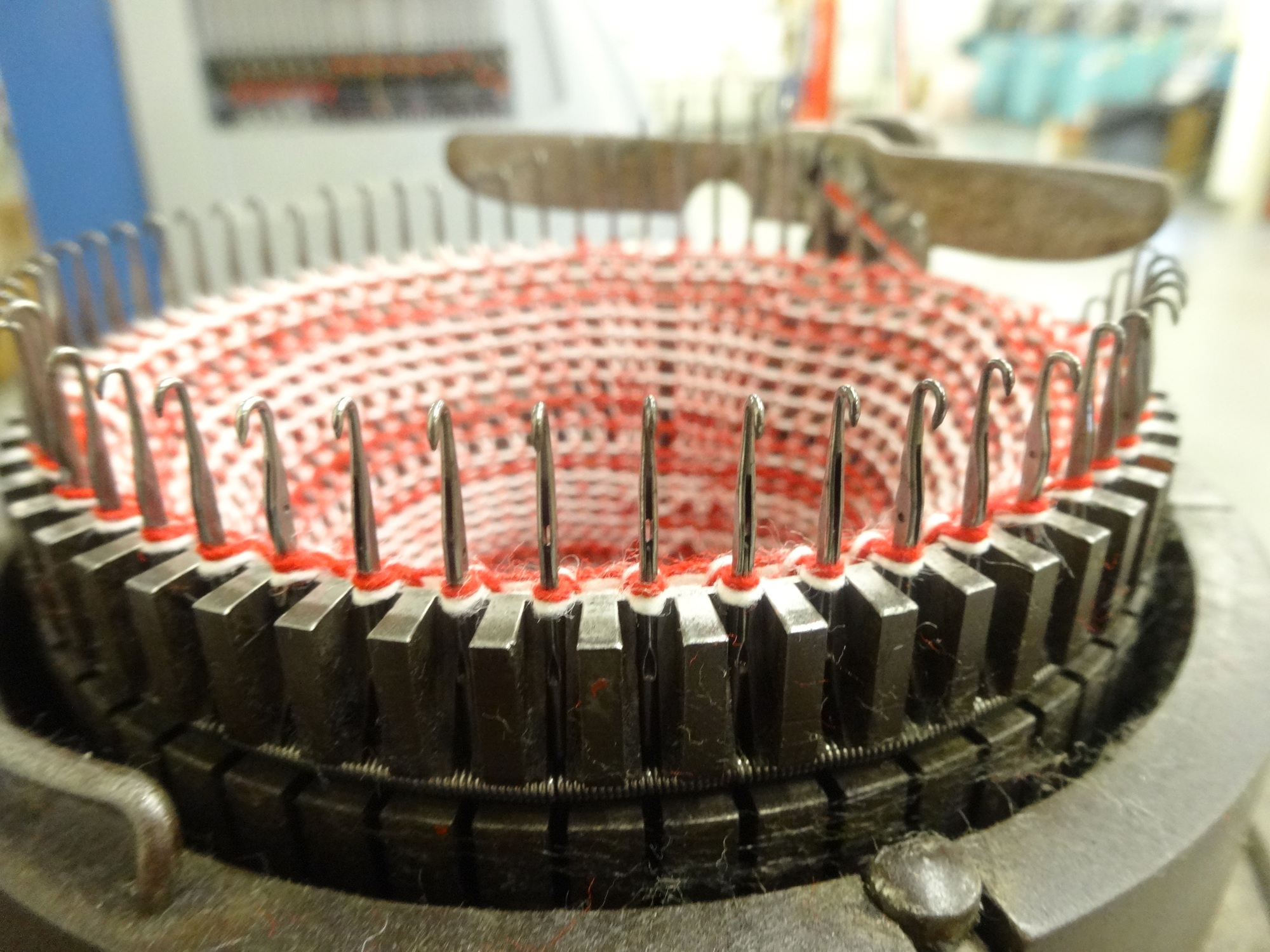
Close-up of a similar machine

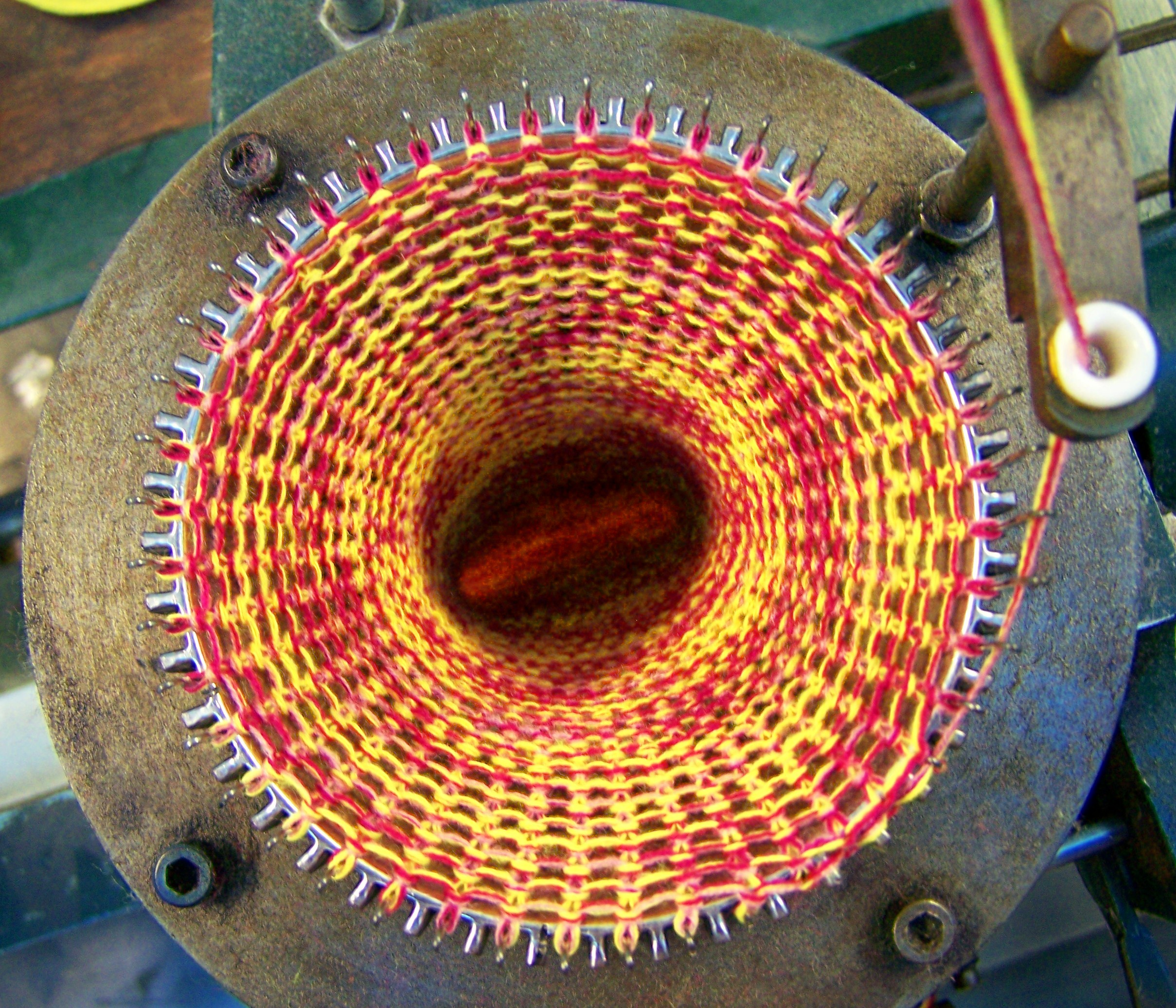
1959 power knitting machine

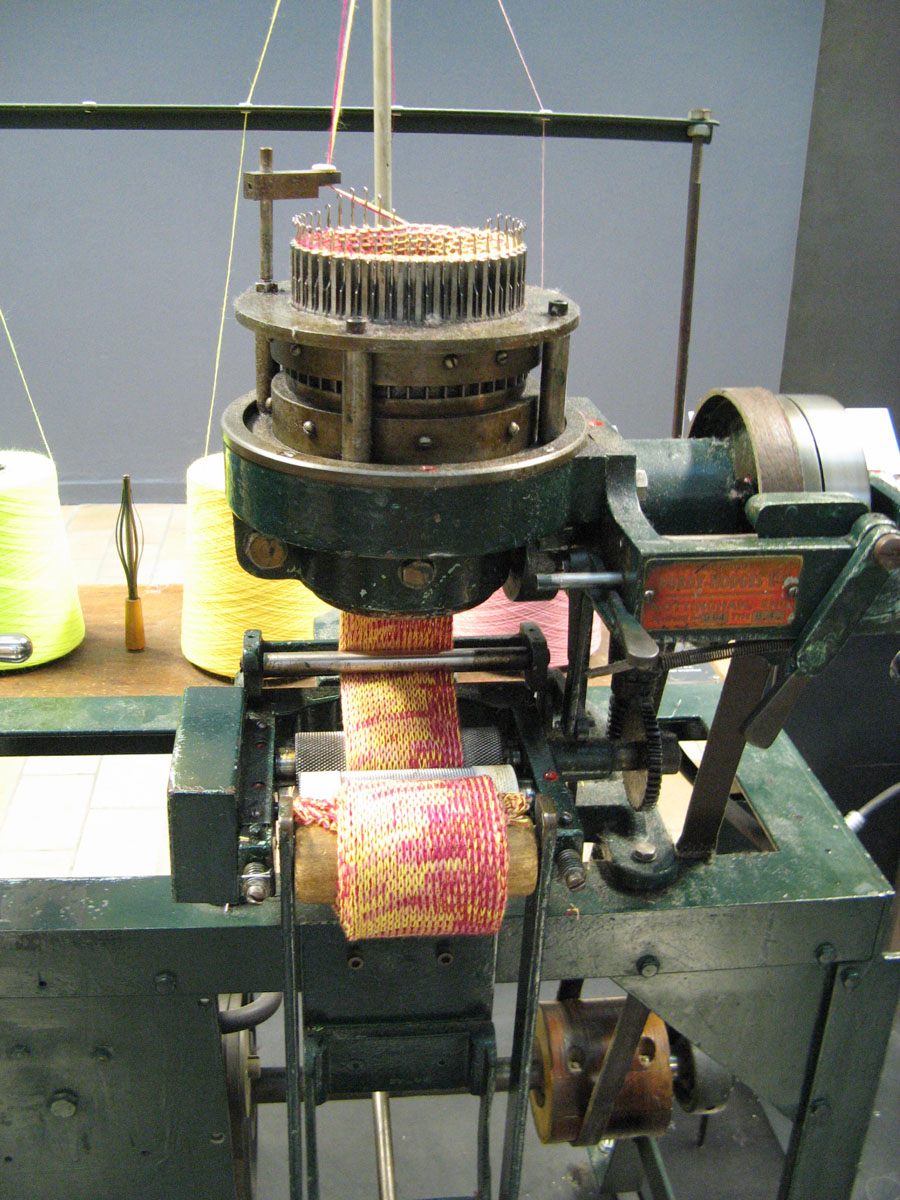
Side view of 1959 machine

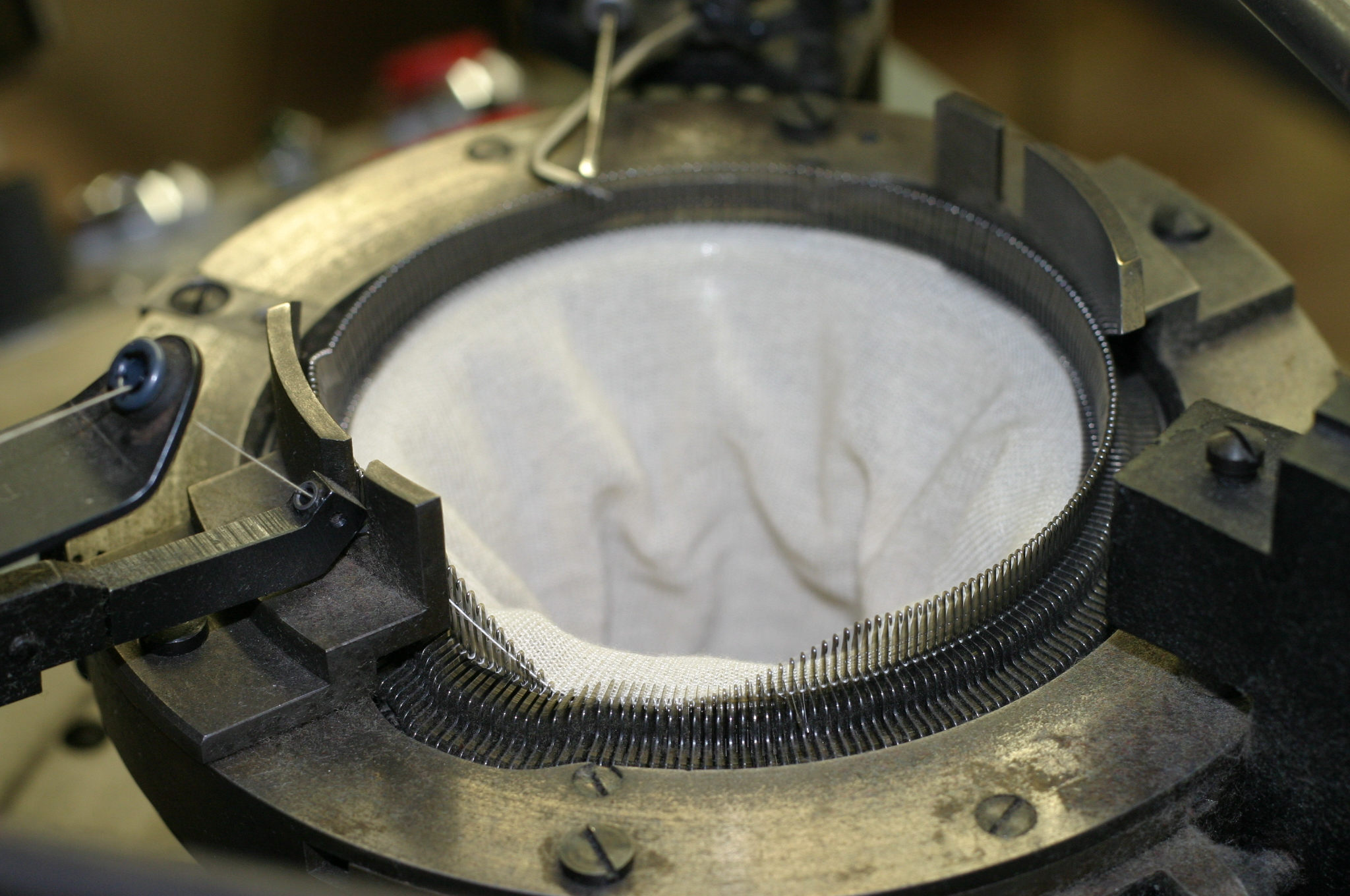
Machine for fine knitting

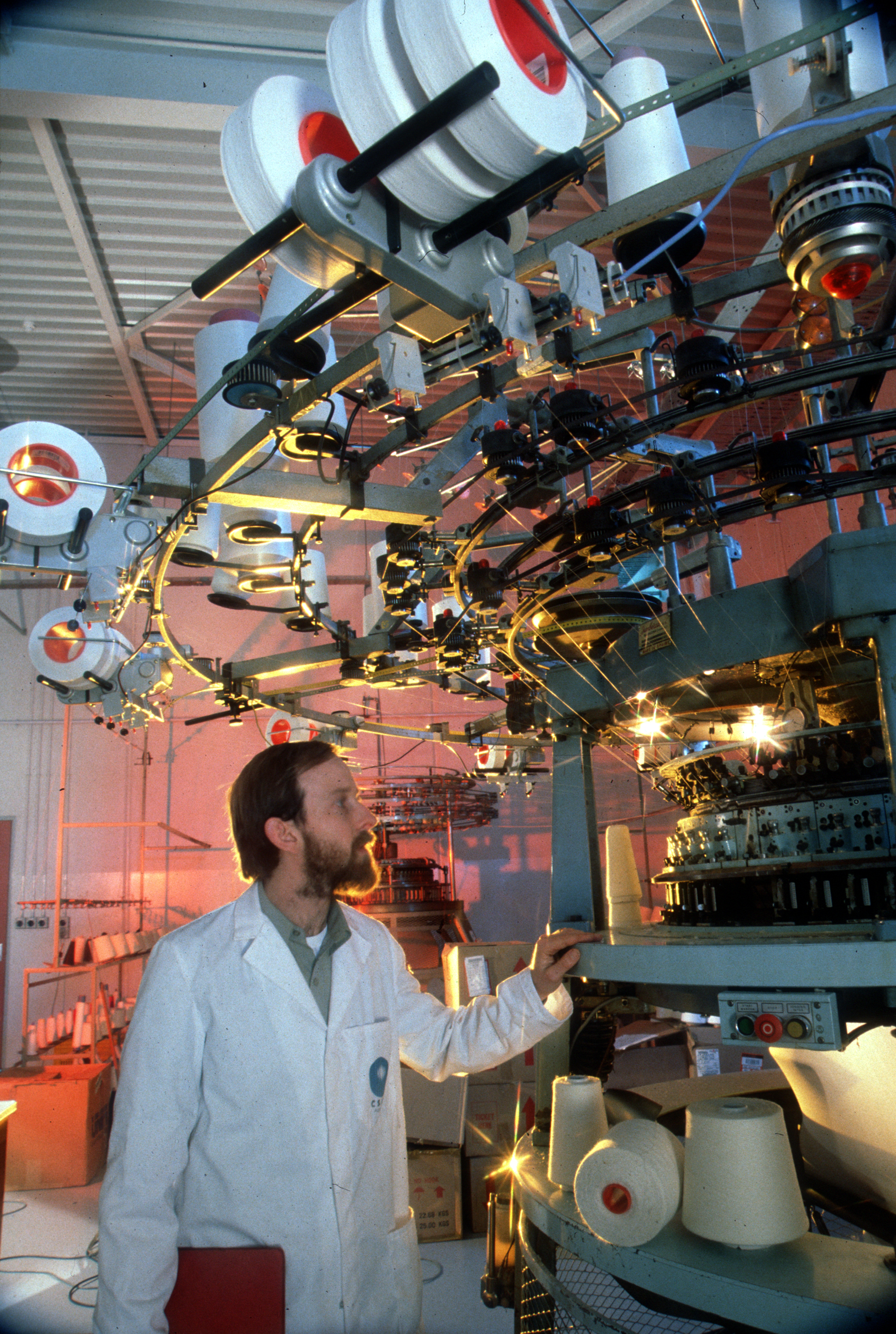
A commercial machine knitting wool, 2000
