= Knitting needle cap =

Cover placed on the tip of a knitting needle

A knitting needle cap for a single needle

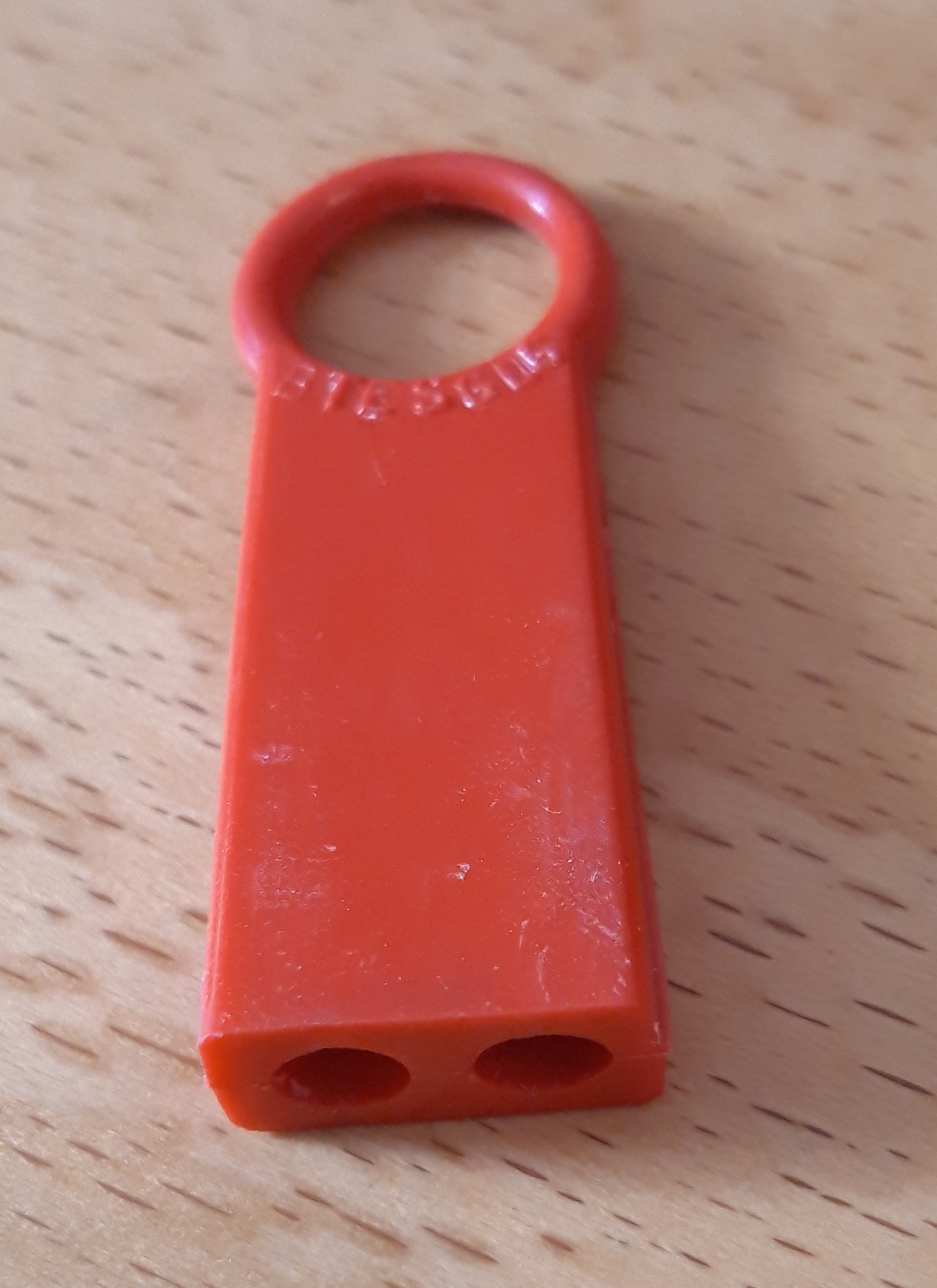
A cap for two needles

A knitting needle cap, also known as a point protector, is a cover placed on the tip of a knitting needle that is being used for a knitting project that is resting. The cap prevents stitches from coming off the ends of needles. Before it became common for straight needles to have a cap at one end, pairs of "needle guards" made of wood or cork and linked with a spring or leather strip, were used to stop stitches slipping off the needles while not in use.

There are knitting needle caps for both one and two needles. Those made for one needle look similar to erasers that are attached to the ends of pencils. Those for two needles are wide and flat with two holes.

A knitting needle cap on a needle
