= Knitting needle =

Tool used for hand-knitting

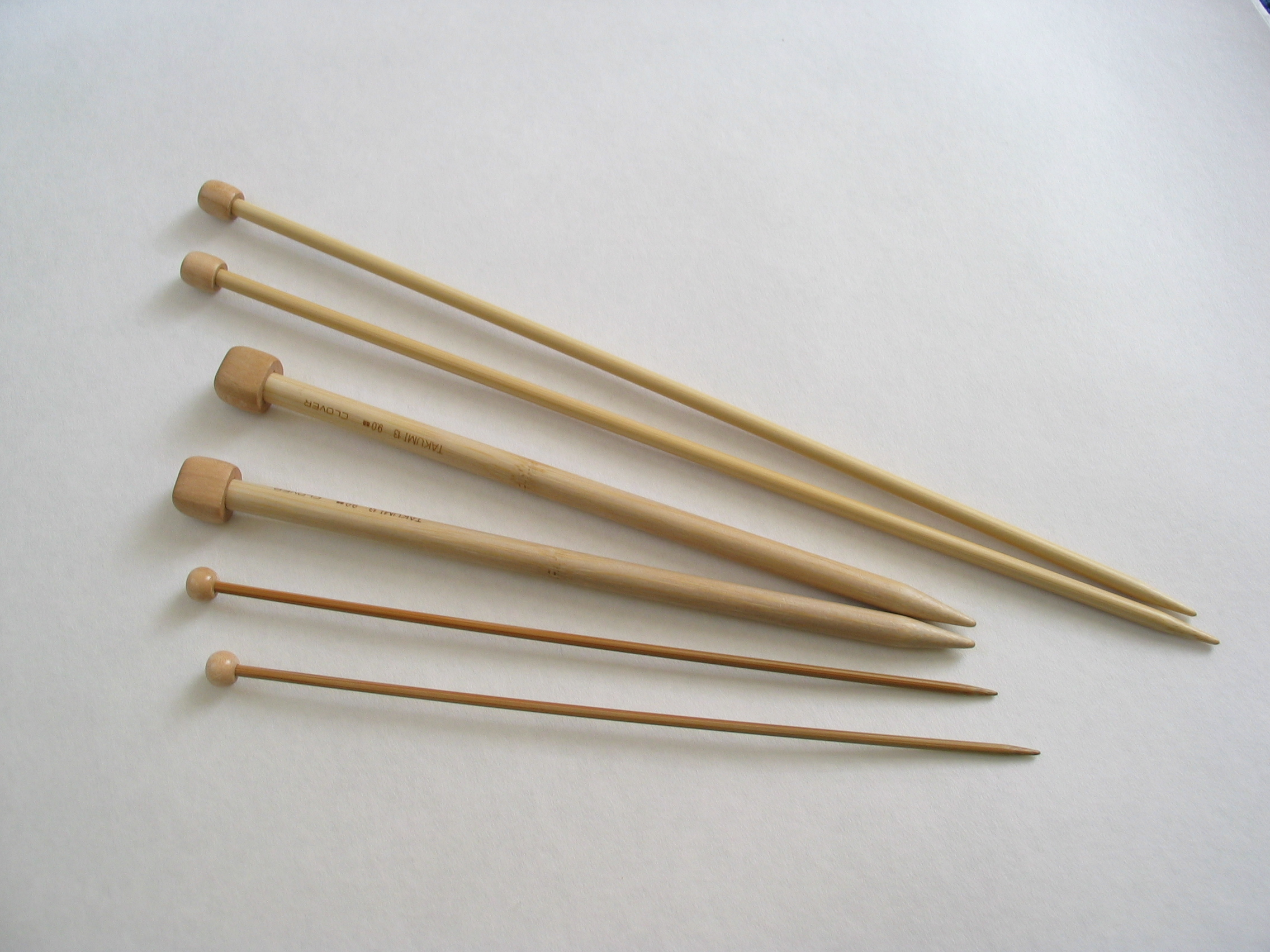
Bamboo knitting needles

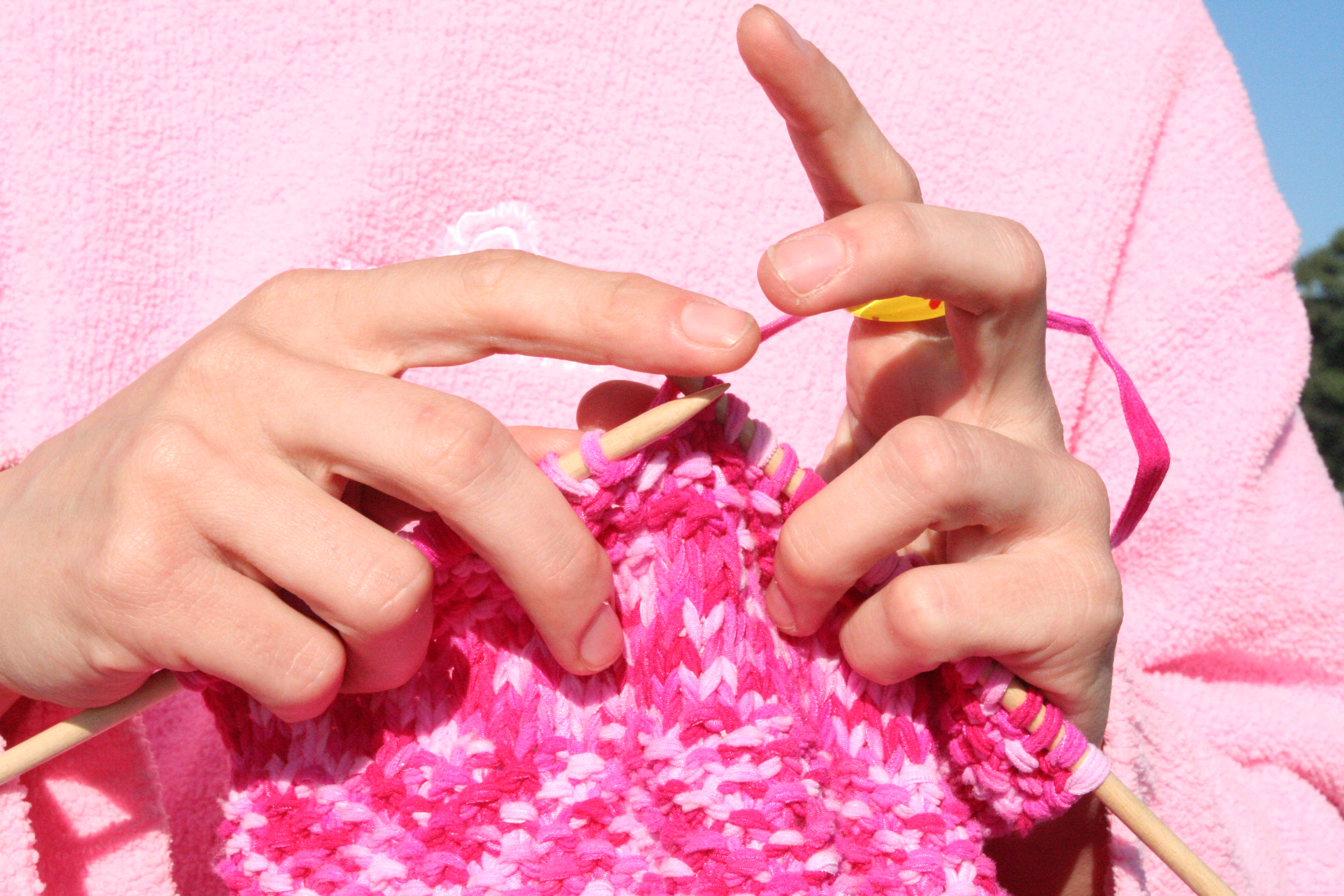
A little dexterity is helpful in working with knitting needles

A knitting needle or knitting pin is a tool in hand-knitting to produce knitted fabrics. They generally have a long shaft and taper at their end, but they are not nearly as sharp as sewing needles. Their purpose is two-fold. The long shaft holds the active (unsecured) stitches of the fabric, to prevent them from unravelling, whereas the tapered ends are used to form new stitches. Most commonly, a new stitch is formed by inserting the tapered end through an active stitch, catching a loop (also called a bight) of fresh yarn and drawing it through the stitch; this secures the initial stitch and forms a new active stitch in its place. In specialized forms of knitting the needle may be passed between active stitches being held on another needle, or indeed between/through inactive stitches that have been knit previously.

The size of a needle is described first by its diameter and secondly by its length. The size of the new stitch is determined in large part by the diameter of the knitting needle used to form it, because that affects the length of the yarn-loop drawn through the previous stitch. Thus, large stitches can be made with large needles, whereas fine knitting requires fine needles. In most cases, the knitting needles being used in hand-knitting are of the same diameter; however, in uneven knitting, needles of different sizes may be used. Larger stitches may also be made by wrapping the yarn more than once around the needles with every stitch. The length of a needle determines how many stitches it can hold at once; for example, very large projects such as a shawl with hundreds of stitches might require a longer needle than a small project such as a scarf or bootie. Various sizing systems for needles are in common use.

== Types ==
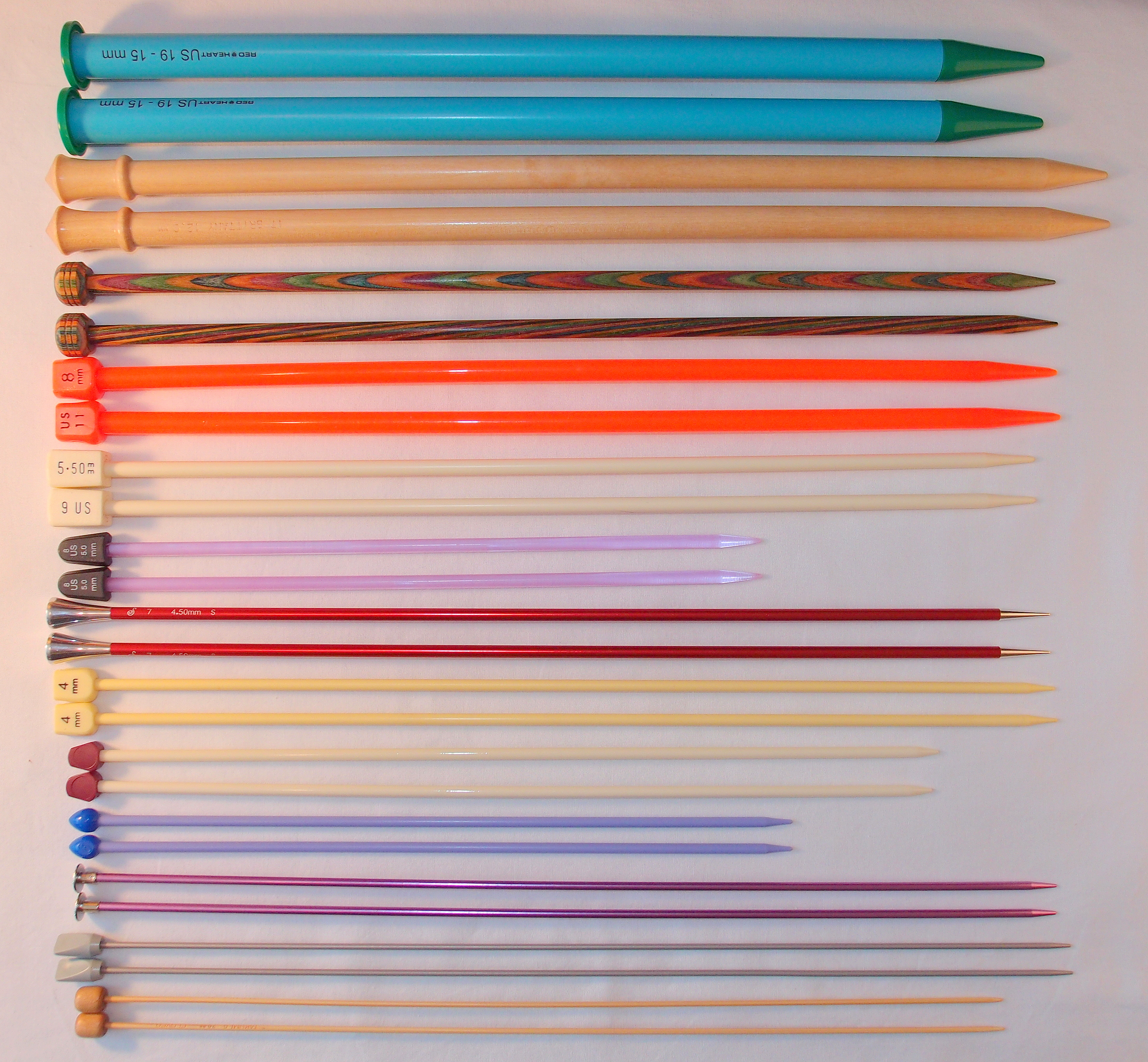
Straight knitting needles in a variety of sizes and materials. Different materials have varying amounts of friction, and are suitable for different yarn types.

=== Single-pointed needles ===
The most widely recognized form of needle is the single-pointed needle. It is a slender, straight stick tapered to a point at one end, with a knob at the other end to prevent stitches from slipping off. Such needles are always used in pairs and are usually 10-16 inches (25.4–40.6 cm) long but, due to the compressibility of knitted fabrics, may be used to knit pieces significantly wider. The knitting of new stitches occurs only at the tapered ends. Fictional depictions of knitting in movies, television programs, animation, and comic strips almost always show knitting done on straight needles. Both Wallace and Gromit and Monty Python, for example, show this type of knitting.

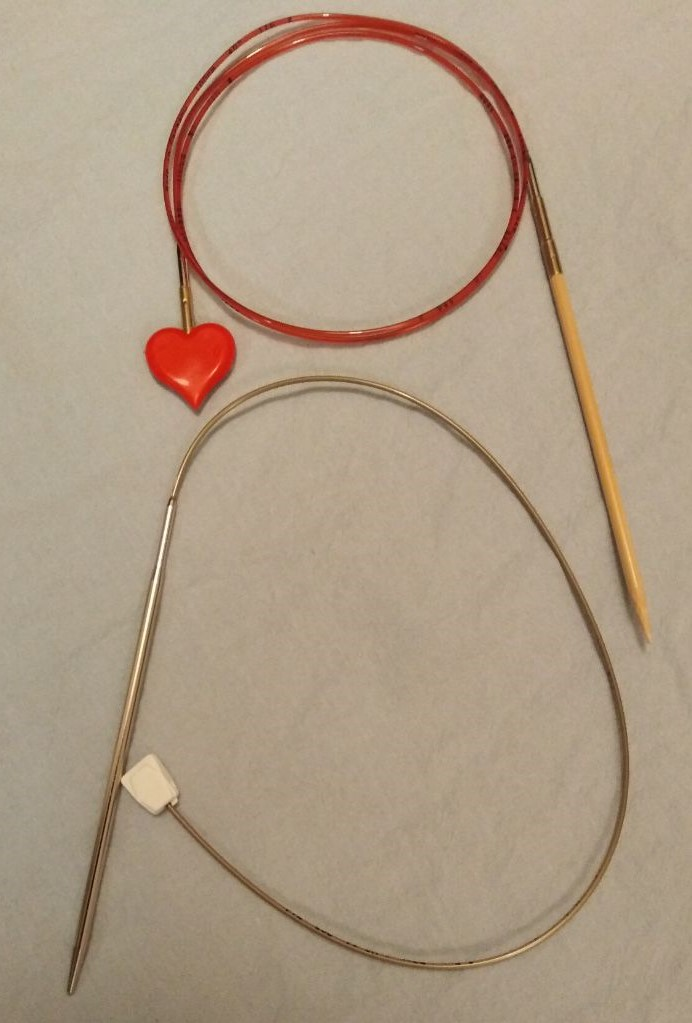
Flexi single-pointed needles. The upper one is constructed from an interchangeable circular knitting needle, a cable and a stopper. The lower one is ready-made.

=== Flexible single-pointed needles ===
Flexible single-pointed needles are used as single-pointed needles.

Flexible single-pointed needles have a rigid needle part, a plastic cable and a stopper at the end of the cable.

Flexible single-pointed needles can be bought readymade, or it is possible to make them yourself, if you have a set of interchangeable circular knitting needles and cables and stoppers.

=== Double-pointed needles ===
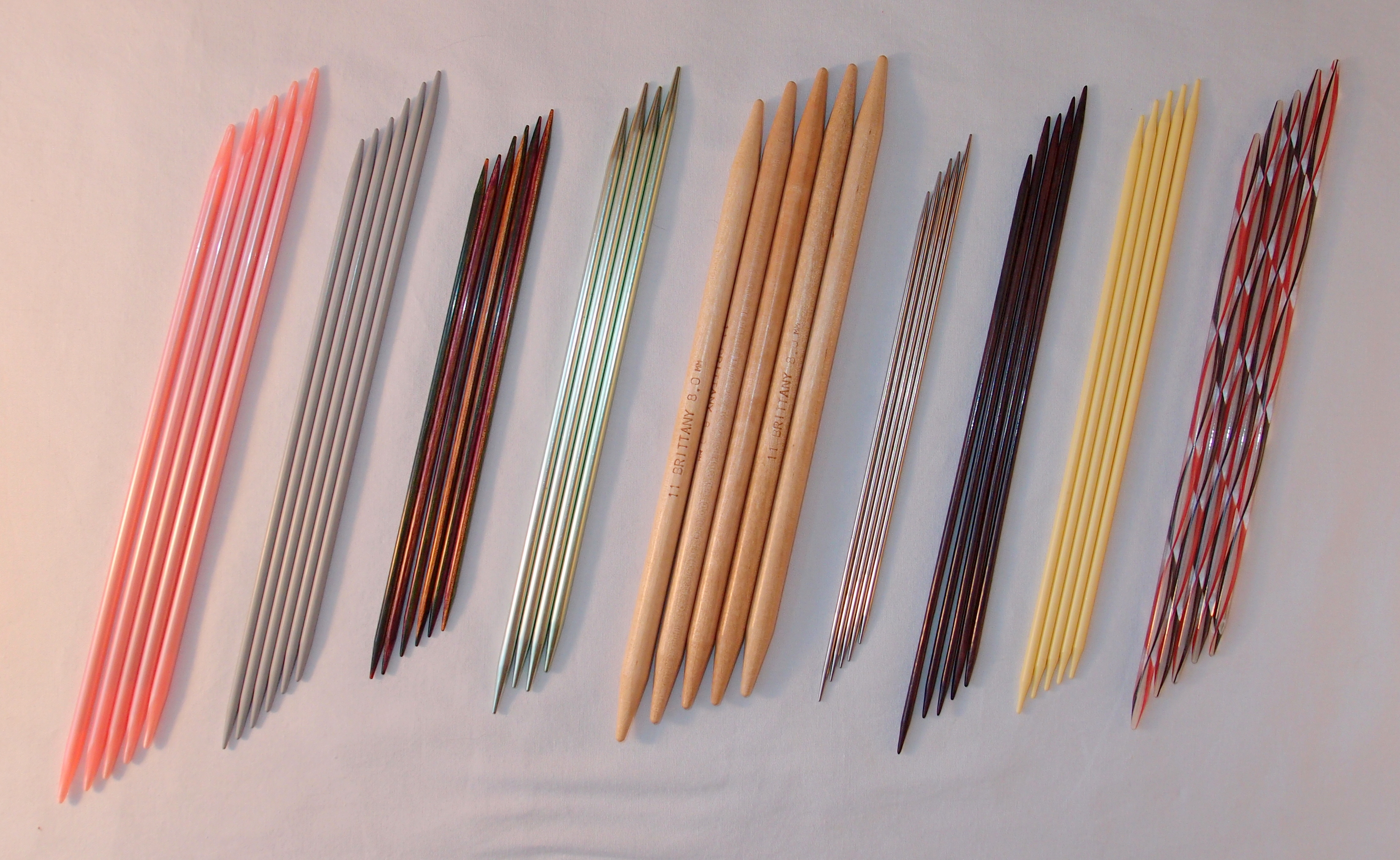
Double-pointed knitting needles in various materials and sizes. They come in sets of four, five or six.

The oldest type of needle is the straight double-pointed needle. Double-pointed needles are tapered at both ends, which allows knitters to add stitches from either end. They are typically used (and sold) in sets of four or five and are commonly used for circular knitting. Since the invention of the circular needle, they have been most commonly used to knit smaller tube-shaped pieces, such as sleeves, collars, and socks. Usually, two needles are active while the others hold the remaining stitches. Double-pointed needles are somewhat shorter than single-pointed or circular needles and are usually used in the 13–20 cm length range, although they are also made longer.

Double-pointed needles are depicted in a number of 14th-century oil paintings, typically called Knitting Madonnas, depicting Mary knitting with double-pointed needles (Rutt, 2003).

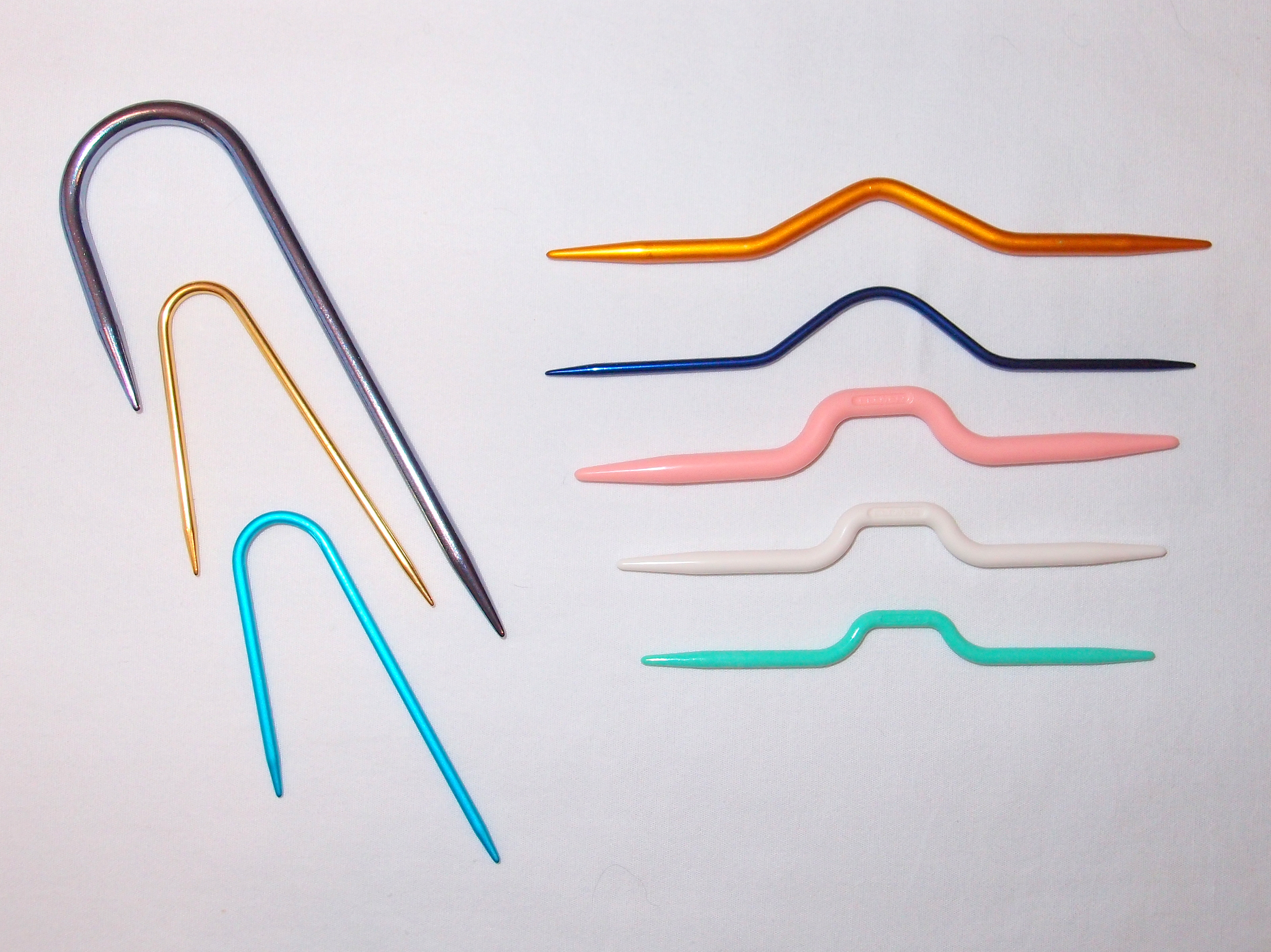
A cable needle is sometimes used.

A cable needle is a special type of double-pointed needle that is typically very short and used to hold a very small number of stitches temporarily while the knitter is forming a cable pattern. They are often U-shaped, or have a U-shaped bend, to keep the held stitches from falling off while the primary needle is being used.

=== Circular needles ===
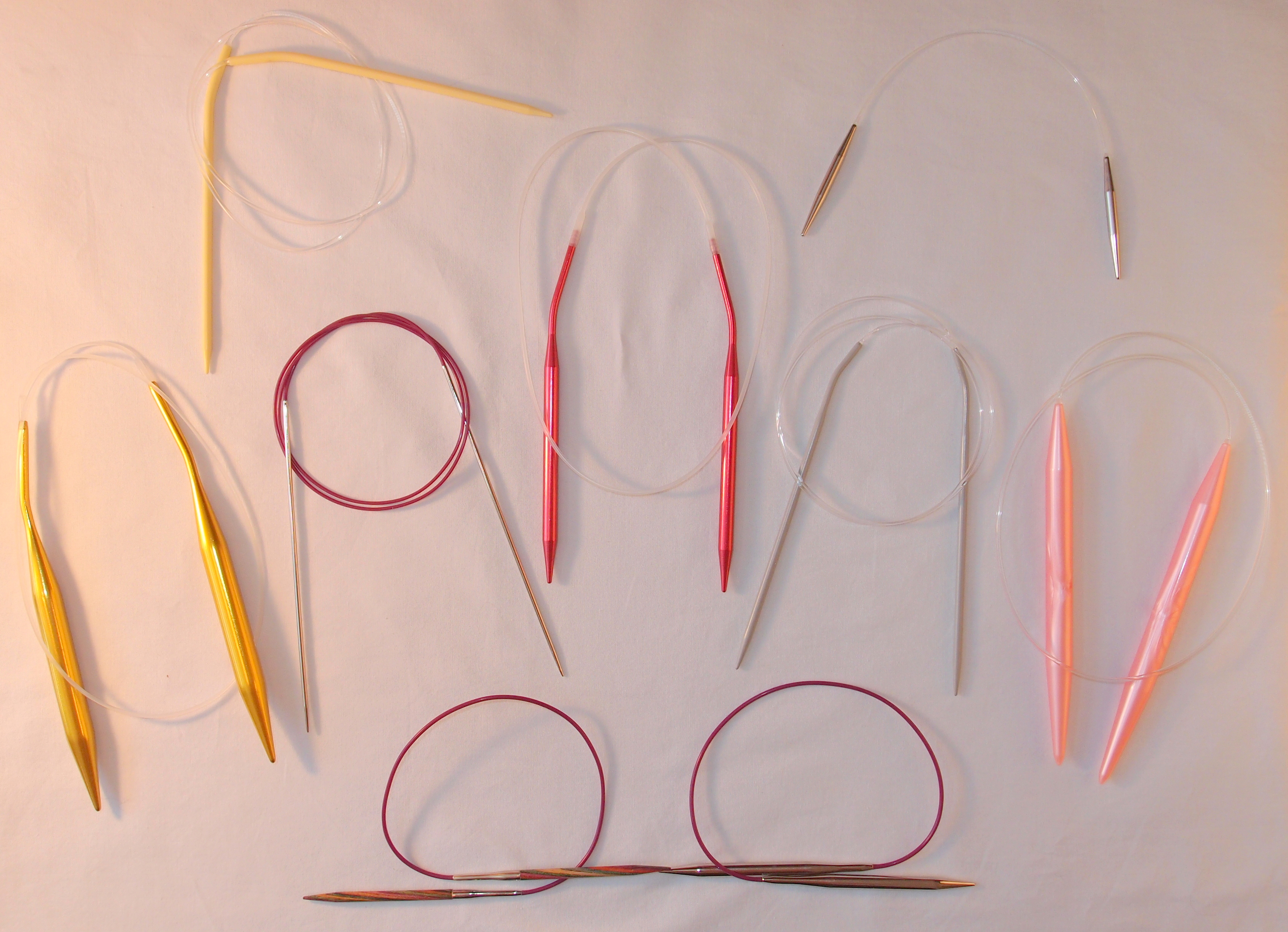
Circular knitting needles in different lengths, materials and sizes, including plastic, aluminum, steel and nickel-plated brass.

The first US patent for a circular needle was issued in 1918, although in Europe they may have been used a little earlier. Circulars are composed of two pointed, straight tips connected by a flexible cable and may be used for both knitting flat or knitting in the round. The two tapered ends, typically 4–5 inches (10.5–13 cm) long, are rigid, allowing for easy knitting, and are connected by the flexible strand (usually made of nylon or coated wire). The tips may be permanently connected to the cable and made in overall lengths from 9 inches (23 cm) to 60 inches (150 cm) or composed of cables and interchangeable tips. This allows various lengths and diameters to be combined into many different sizes of needles, allowing for a great variety of needs to be met by a relatively few component pieces. The ability to work from either end of one needle is convenient in several types of knitting, such as slip-stitch versions of double knitting.

In using circulars to knit flat pieces of fabric the two ends are used just as two separate needles would be. The knitter holds one tip in each hand and knits straight across the width of the fabric, turns the work, and knits or purls back the other way. Using circular needles has some advantages, for example, the weight of the fabric is more evenly distributed, therefore less taxing, on the arms and wrists of the knitter and, the length of the cable may be longer than would be practical with rigid needles since the cable and fabric rest in the lap of the knitter rather than extending straight out past the arms.

The lack of a purl row in stockinette stitch, since in the round (commonly referred to as ITR) knitting is all done using the knit stitch, is often perceived to be one of the greatest benefits of ITR. Knitting ITR with circulars is done in a spiral, the same way as using double-pointed needles (usually called DPNs). Additionally, circulars eliminate the need to continually switch from one needle to the next, and there is no possibility of stitches falling off the back end of the needles, as may happen when using DPNs. Much larger tubes may be knit ITR, too, helping items to be completed more quickly. Construction of garments such as sweaters may be greatly simplified when knitting ITR, since the finishing steps of sewing a back, two fronts, and two sleeves of a sweater together may be almost entirely eliminated in neck down ITR knitting.

Knitting educator and authority Elizabeth Zimmermann helped popularize knitting ITR specifically with circular needles.

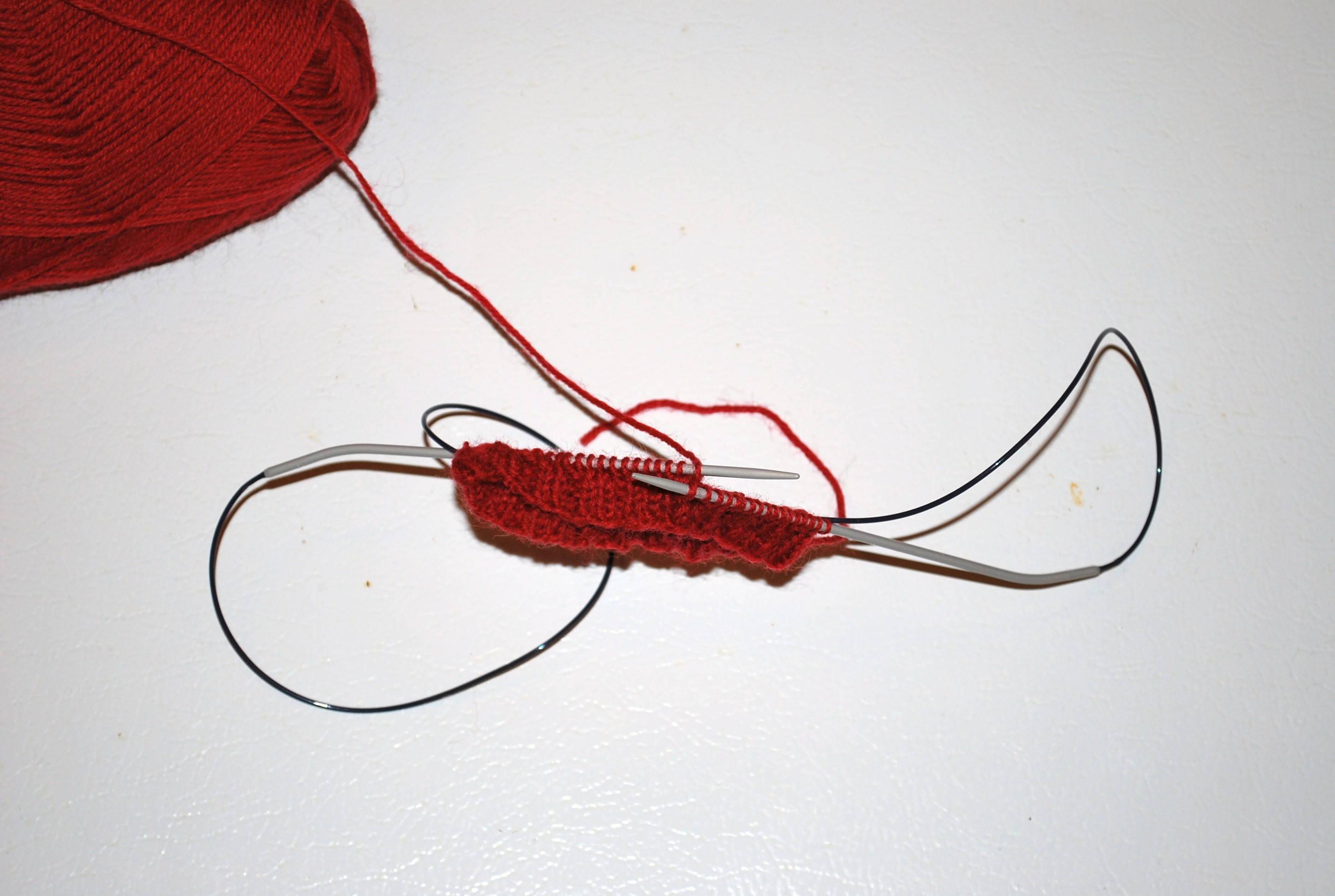
The Magic Loop method may be used to produce narrow tubular items such as socks.

Numerous techniques have been devised for the production of narrow tubular knitting on circular needles. One common method is to use two needles in place of the four or five double-pointed needles traditionally used, while a newer technique is to use one circular needle that is significantly longer than the circumference of the item being knitted. This technique is known as Magic Loop and has recently become a popular method of producing tubular knitting, as only one needle is required.

== The Guinness World Record for knitting with the largest knitting needles ==
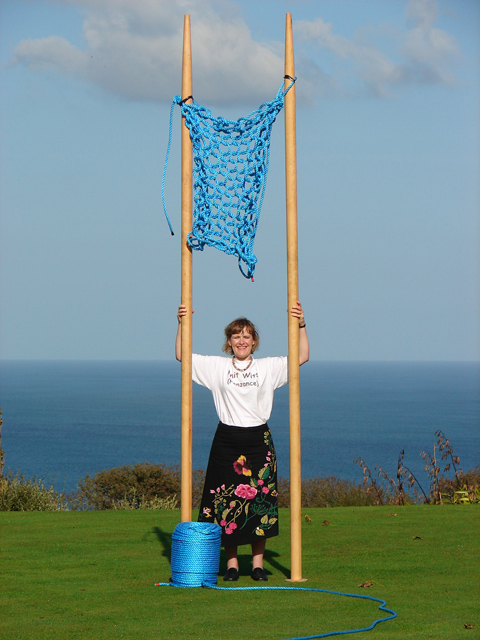
Julia Hopson and her former world record needles

The current holder of this title is Elizabeth "Betsy" Bond who is a British art student and creator of the world's largest knitting needles, which are 14 feet long. To achieve the world record in 2018, Bond needed to knit at least 10 stitches and 10 rows of yarn with her needles. The yarn she used for the feat was made of 35 pounds of machine knitted, hand-twisted cotton material.

She beats Julia Hopson of Penzance in Cornwall. Julia had knitted a tension square of ten stitches and ten rows in stocking stitch using knitting needles that were 6.5cm in diameter and 3.5 metres long.

== Needle materials ==
In addition to common wood and metal needles, antique knitting needles were sometimes made from tortoiseshell, ivory and walrus tusks; these materials are now banned due to their impact on endangered species, and needles made from them are virtually impossible to find.

There are, however, a now vintage style of needle which appears to be tortoiseshell, but is actually made from a celluloid, sometimes known as shellonite. These needles were made in Australia, but are no longer manufactured.

Modern knitting needles are made of bamboo, aluminium, steel, wood, plastic, glass, casein and carbon fibers.

== Needle storage ==
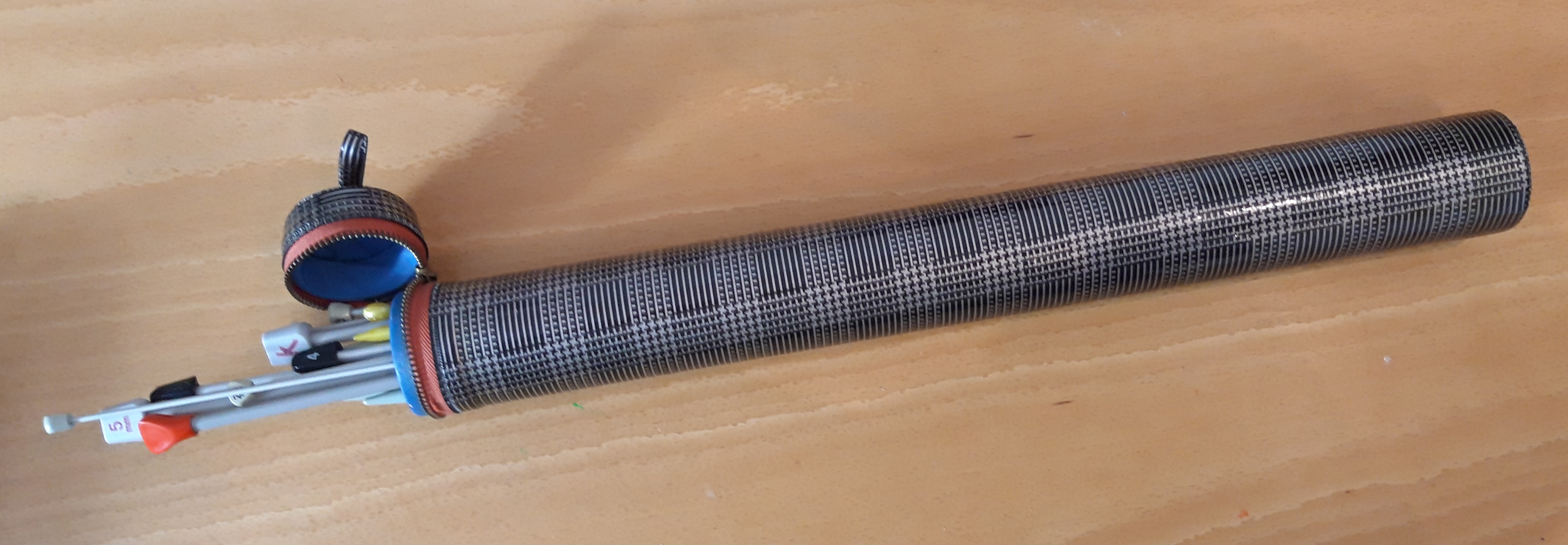
Container for needles

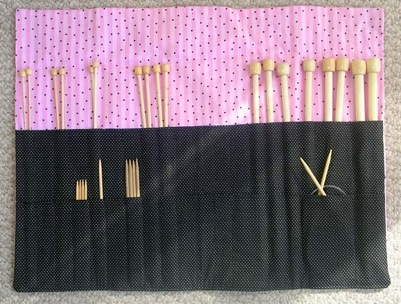
Knitting needles case

A tall, cylindrical container with padding on the bottom to keep the points sharp can store straight needles neatly. Fabric or plastic cases similar to cosmetic bags or a chef's knife bag allow straight needles to be stored together yet separated by size, then rolled to maximize space. Circular needles may be stored with the cables coiled in cases made specifically for this purpose or hung dangling from a hanger device with cables straight. If older circulars with the nylon or plastic cables are coiled for storage it may be necessary to soak them in hot water for a few minutes to get them to uncoil and relax for ease of use. Most recently manufactured cables eliminate this problem and may be stored coiled without any difficulty. Care must be taken not to kink the metal cables of older circulars, as these kinks will not come out and may damage or snag yarn as it is knit.

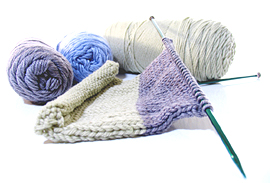
Knitting needles with yarn

== Needle gauge ==
A needle gauge makes it possible to determine the size of a knitting needle. Some may also be used to gauge the size of crochet hooks. Most needles come with the size written on them, but with use and time, the label often wears off, and many needles (like double-pointed needles) tend not to be labelled.

Needle gauges can be made of any material, but are often made of metal and plastic. They tend to be about 3 by 5 inches. There are holes of various sizes through which the needles are passed to determine which hole they fit best, and often a ruler along the edge for determining the tension (also called gauge) of a sample.

== Needle sizes and conversions ==
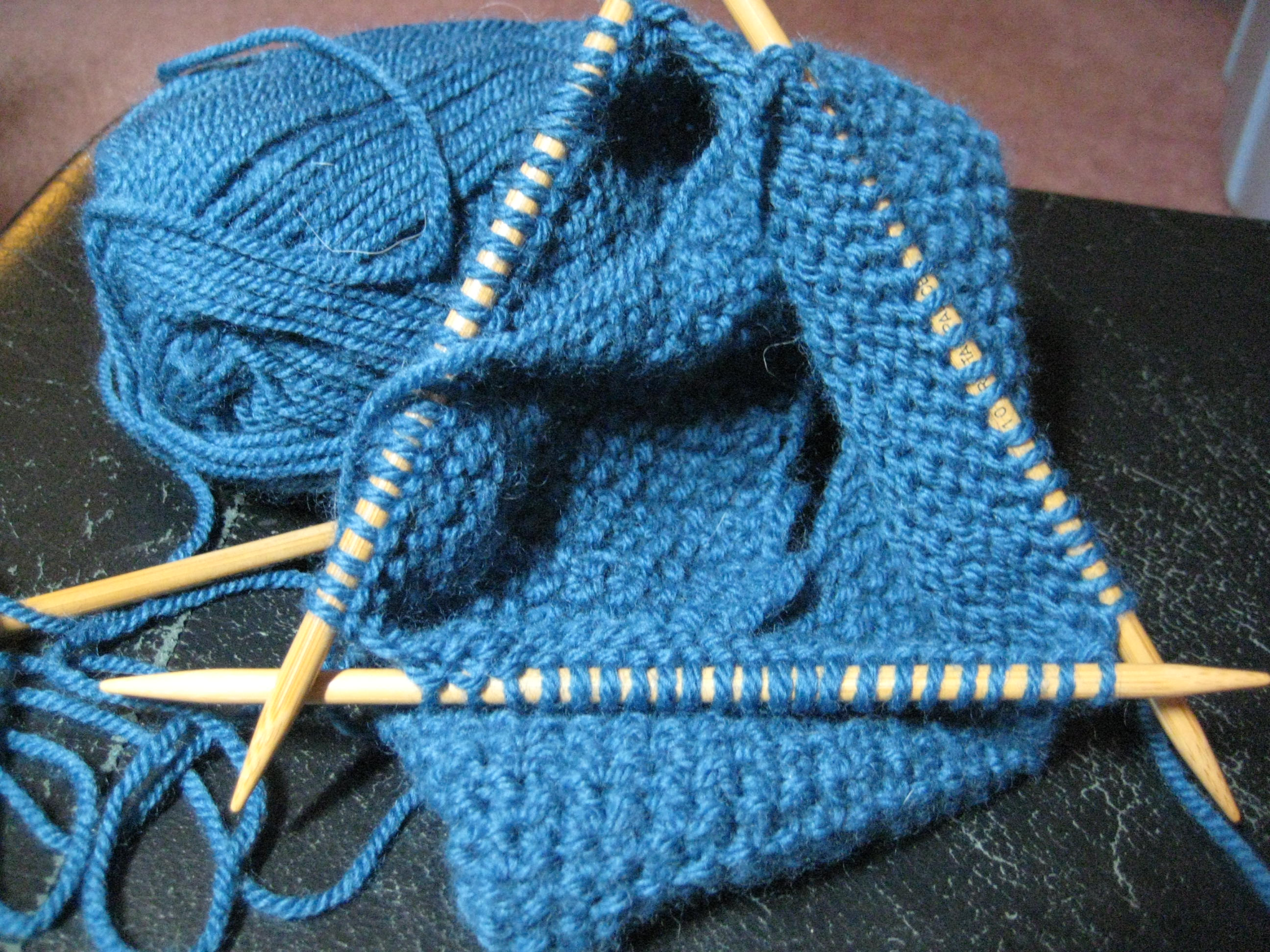
Four double-pointed needles in use. One double-pointed needle creates new stitches while the remaining needles hold stitches in place. This is called "knitting in the round".

In the UK, the metric system is used. Previously, needles 'numbers' were the Standard Wire Gauge designation of the wire from which metal needles were made. The origin of the numbering system is uncertain but it is thought that needle numbers were based on the number of increasingly fine dies that the wire had to be drawn through. This meant thinner needles had a larger number.

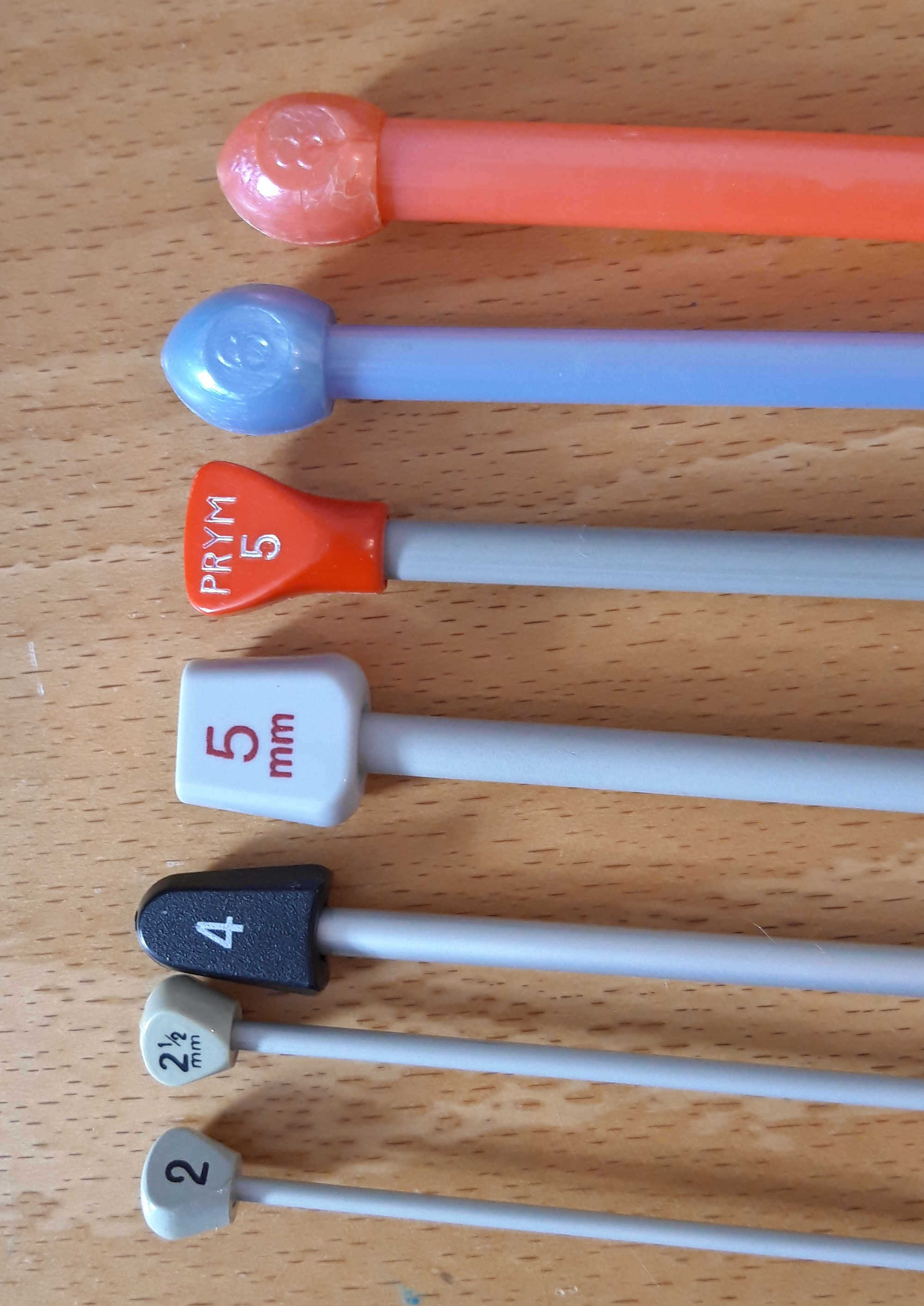
Needles with their size in mm

In the current US system, things are opposite, that is, smaller numbers indicate smaller needles. There is an "old US system" that is divided into standard and steel needles, the latter being fine lace needles. Occasionally, older lace patterns will refer to these smaller needles in the old measurement system. Finally, there was a system used in continental Europe that predated the metric system. It is largely obsolete, but some older or reprinted patterns call for pins in these sizes.

Standardized yarn weight system
Category name	Description	Crochet gauge (stitches per inch in single crochet)	Metric hook size	US hook size	Knitting gauge (number of stitches per four inches in stockinette)	Metric knitting needle size	US knitting needle size
Lace	fingering, crochet 10-count thread	33–40 sts	1.5–2.25 mm	B‑1	33–40 sts	1.5–2.25 mm	000–1
Super fine	sock, fingering, baby	21–32 sts	2.25–3.5 mm	B‑1 – E‑4	27–32 sts	2.25–3.25 mm	1–3
Fine	sport, baby	16–20 sts	3.5–4.5 mm	E‑4 – 7	23–26 sts	3.25–3.75 mm	3–5
Light	DK, light worsted	12–17 sts	4.5–5.5 mm	7 – I‑9	21–24 sts	3.75–4.5 mm	5–7
Medium	worsted, Afghan, Aran	11–14 sts	5.5–6.5 mm	I‑9 – K‑10 1/2	16–20 sts	4.5–5.5 mm	7–9
Bulky	chunky, craft, rug	8–11 sts	6.5–9 mm	K‑10 1/3 – M‑13	12–15 sts	5.5–8 mm	9–11
Super bulky	bulky, roving	5–9 sts	9–15 mm	M‑13 – Q	7–11 sts	8–12.75 mm	11–17
Jumbo	jumbo, roving	6 sts and fewer	15 mm and higher	Q and larger	6 sts and fewer	12.75 mm and higher	17+

Needle Size Conversions
Metric size (mm)	US size	Old UK size	Japanese size	Old US Standard	Old US Steel	Old Continental
0.5	8/0	24				8/0
0.7	6/0	22				6/0
1	5/0	19			18	5/0
1.1						4/0
1.25	4/0	18			16	000
1.5	000	17			15	00
1.75	00	15			14	0
2.0	0	14		0	13	1
2.1			0			
2.25	1	13			12	
2.4			1			
2.5	1 ½			1		2
2.7			2			
2.75	2	12		2	11	
3.0	2 ½	11	3	3	10	2 ½
3.25	3	10				
3.3			4			
3.5	4			4	9	3
3.6			5			
3.75	5	9		5	8	
3.9			6			
4.0	6	8				4
4.25			7	6		
4.5	7	7	8			5
4.75			9	7		6
5.0	8	6		8		7
5.1			10			
5.25				9		
5.4			11			
5.5	9	5				8
5.75			12	10		
6.0	10	4	13			9
6.3			14			
6.5	10 ½	3		10 ½		10
6.6			15			
7.0		2	7 mm			11
7.5		1				12
8.0	11	0	8 mm			13
9.0	13	00	9 mm			14
10.0	15	000	10 mm			15
11.0						17
12.5	17					
13.0						19
14.0	18					
16.0	19		16 mm			
19.0	35					
25.0	50		25 mm			

== See also ==
- Crochet hook
- Knitting needle cap
- Needle card
