= Knitter's Almanac =

Knitting book by Elizabeth Zimmermann

- Author: Elizabeth Zimmermann
- Published: 1974 Charles Scribner's Sons; 1981 Dover Books
- Pages: 150
- ISBN: 0-486-24178-5
- OCLC: 8398496

Elizabeth Zimmermann's Knitter's Almanac, or simply Knitter's Almanac, is a knitting book by British-born knitter Elizabeth Zimmermann. It was originally published in 1974 by Charles Scribner's Sons, and then republished in 1981 by Dover Publications. The book has twelve chapters, one for each month of the year. While not initially as commercial successful as Zimmerman's previous book, Knitting Without Tears, it was met with mostly positive reviews from critics who favoured Zimmermann's conversational writing style and inclusion of anecdotes and other stories from her life. Its original publication brough Zimmermann to a wider audience, and in the twenty-first century it has been regarded as a classic knitting book.

== Publication history ==
Zimmermann wrote the original 320-page draft for what would become Knitter's Almanac from January 1 to August 31, 1971. It was declined by her editor, Elinor Parker, due to Parker's concerns that the text was "perhaps [...] a little too discursive" and that, combined with the book's untraditional format, might leave "book stores wondering under what section they should put it". Zimmermann worked the book, and it was published in 1974 by Charles Scribner's Sons. It was Zimmermann's second book, and was initially met with poor sales when compared to her earlier Knitting Without Tears, though it was republished in 1981 by Dover Books under the title Elizabeth Zimmermann's Knitter's Almanac. After the book's first release, Zimmermann held an book signing in Marshfield, Wisconsin. It was the city's first book signing event.

Knitter's Almanac included illustrations drawn by Zimmermann and photographs by Tom Zimmermann; it was considerably shorter than the original draft, which was thought by Zimmermann's family and publishing company, Schoolhouse Press, to be lost until its rediscovery amongst Zimmermann's personal effects.

== Summary ==
Modeled after the style of an almanac, the book contains twelve chapters, one for each month of the year, as well as an index and an "appendix of possibly unfamiliar terms and idiosyncratic procedures". Each chapter is named for one of the twelve months, and is dedicated to a particular type of knitted item or garment. The chapters also include Zimmermann's personal writings, both about her events in her life and knitting more broadly. It is written in the "chatty" style meant to "encourage people to knit". She used a similar style in her earlier Knitting Without Tears, which had received positive feedback from fans. In a letter to her editor, Zimmermann wrote that she wished to include more "glimpses of [her] life and circumstances” than she had added to her earlier work.

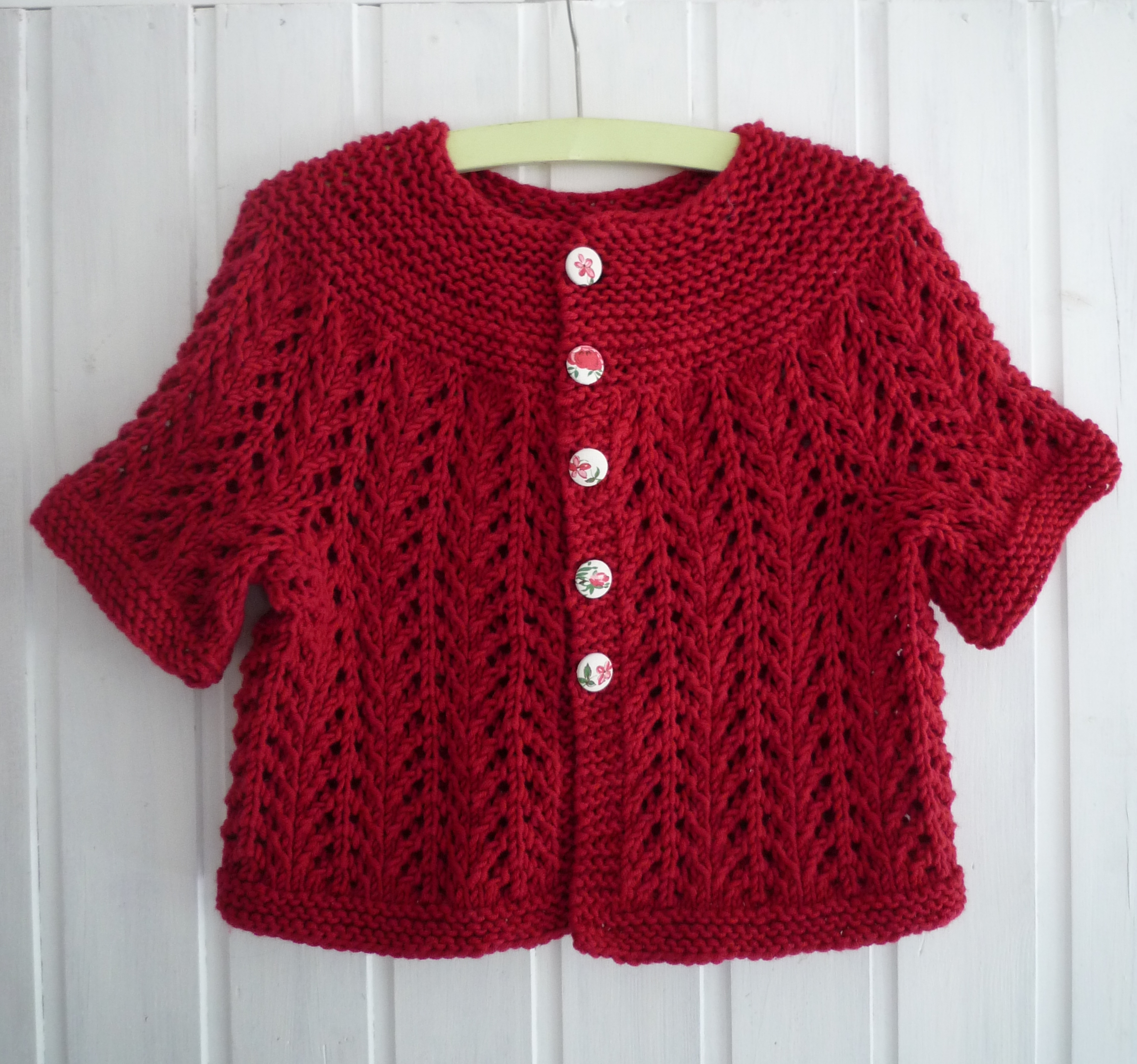
February's baby sweater

In the first chapter, for January, Zimmermann provides instructions for an Aran sweater and matching cap, which incorporate cable designs from Gladys Thompson's Patterns for Guernseys, Jerseys & Arans: Fishermen's Sweaters from the British Isles. She recommends knitting the cap to calculate the knitter's gauge and thus the number of stitches needed to create a sweater. February's chapter contains an introduction to double knitting, as well as patterns for a blanket, a worked-flat baby sweater, baby leggings, a shawl, and a pot-holder. Chapter three, March, is dedicated to a Chainmail Sweater, a colourwork sweater inspired by the Bohus sweaters made in Sweden during the twentieth century, and April's chapter contains instructions for a seamless modular blanket, fastened together through grafting.

The patterns she includes for the summer are often smaller and more lightweight than the winter patterns. Zimmermann advocates knitting mittens in the summer, so that the knitter can "enjoy them" without feeling pressured to complete them quickly. For May, she includes two patterns – one for mitered mittens, and one for Norwegian mittens. For June she provides three hat patterns, and in July she gives instructions for a buttonhole, knit in one row, and a circular shawl, later known as the "Pi Shawl".

August's chapter has instructions for knitted Christmas tree decorations and plans for a potential sock heel. September's chapter gives instructions for child and adult-sized tights as well an essay where she expressed her views about how and why children should be taught to knit, and October has a pattern for an open-collared pullover, knit in the round. In November, Zimmermann describes how to make "Moccasin Socks", the construction of which is reminiscent of a baby bootie and which Zimmermann designed to be "totally refootable". The final chapter, for December, is focused around a sweater knit in larger weight wool and designed to be knit quickly as a last-minute gift. It also teaches the reader how to knit in the dark.

The book provides the first published use of Zimmermann's word unvent, a word she coined to describe the knitting process after taking a dislike to the word invent. According to Zimmermann, the word invent made her think of the "rubbish" idea of a knitter in a "clean white coat" surrounded by "charts like sales charts and graphs like the economy" and whose actual work was done by "bevy of hand-knitters in the backroom".

== Reception ==
The publication of Knitter's Almanac in 1974 helped increase Zimmermann's prominence as a knitter, as both it and the earlier Knitting Without Tears were noticed and reviewed by both local and national publications. Zimmermann also received letters from fans about the one; one such message contained a note from a woman who compared the unforgettableness of the moment she discovered Knitter's Almanac to the moment people first learnt that John F. Kennedy had been assassinated. The fan also said that the book had "set [her] free as a knitter".

Zimmermann's conversation style met with mostly positive reviews from critics. According to a reviewer in UPI, it was "written with such good humor" that they recommended it to even those who "don't like to knit", a sentiment echoed in Artisan Crafts, which said it was "hard to say" if Zimmermann's book was "a novel or a craft book". Journalist Celestine Sibley was especially fond of Zimmermann's writing, both in Knitter's Almanac and other works, saying that they were "not merely pattern books...but warm, funny personal anecdotes". She said that Knitter's Almanac in particular had done "so much more" than be a pattern book: it was "warm and readable" and provided a readers with an account of Zimmermans's life. Sibley's reviews of Knitter's Alamanac and Knitting Without Tears "were among the earliest and most prominent notices of Elizabeth’s work", and may have been the first national attention Zimmermann's work received. Conversely, author Goody L. Solomon's review in the magazine Woman's World was mostly negative. She described the instructions as "unintelligible", and criticized both the number of patterns, which she felt were too few for the price, and what she felt was Zimmermann's attempt at a "cute and whimsical" writing style. She accused Zimmermann of being condescending to the readers and "posing as Grandma who has all the answers".

Individual patterns were reviewed as well. The Intelligencer Journal noted that they were "timely" and suited to the "seasonal activities" of the knitter, and knitter Pat Trexler described July's button hole pattern as "a jewel". A 2013 review in the Wisconsin State Journal described December's sweater and July's "Pi Shawl" as highlights, while a contemporaneous a review in The Milwaukee Journal described January's Aran sweater as the most difficult pattern in the book.

Knitter's Almanac was described as a "classic" of knitting and crafting books by the Times Literary Supplement in 2019 and Library Journal in 2011. Library Journal also recorded it as one of the best-selling crafting books in 2009.

In 2016, American knitter Stephen West made reference to Zimmermann and held a copy of Knitter's Almanac as he sung a song about knitting, inspired and set to the tune of Katy Perry's "Firework"
