= Barbara G. Walker =

American novelist (1930–2025)

- Born: Barbara Goodwin Jones; July 2, 1930; Philadelphia, Pennsylvania, U.S.
- Died: December 21, 2025 (aged 95); Sarasota, Florida, U.S.
- Education: University of Pennsylvania
- Occupation: Author
- Known for: Knitting expert
- Spouse: Gordon Walker (m. 1952; died 2017)
- Children: 1

Barbara Goodwin Walker (née Jones; July 2, 1930 – December 21, 2025) was an American author and feminist. She was a knitting expert and the author of over ten encyclopedic knitting references, despite "not taking to it at all" when she first learned in college. Other topics she wrote about included religion, New Age, the occult, spirituality, and mythology.

== Knitting ==
In the 1960s and 1970s, Walker authored several volumes of knitting references which have become landmarks for their comprehensiveness and clarity. Her Knitting Treasury series documents over a thousand different knitting stitches. Other books considered mosaic knitting, for producing multicolored designs while knitting only one color per row, and constructing knitted garments from the top down rather than the usual bottom-up method used in Western knitting tradition. Most of Walker's best-known knitting books have been reprinted, and starting in the mid-1990s, she published new knitting books.

== Feminism and skepticism ==
Walker wrote about the problems with mainstream religion and how these problems have contributed to patriarchal societies and sexism. In The Skeptical Feminist: Discovering the Virgin, Mother, and Crone, she wrote about her belief that there is no god. However, she believed that people, and women in particular, can use the image of the goddess in their day-to-day lives. Walker often uses the imagery of the Mother Goddess to discuss neolithic matriarchies. Her book Woman's Rituals: A Sourcebook was an attempt to show how she put her "meditation techniques" into practice, and meant as a guide for other women who wish to do the same.

=== Criticism ===
The Woman's Encyclopedia of Myths and Secrets has been criticized for being based on the idea of the "Great Mother" by writers like Robert Graves and Erich Neumann, and for rewriting myths so they would support the theory of a "Great Goddess". (Note: Diane Purkiss, "Women's Rewriting of Myth", in Carolyne Larrington (ed), The Feminist Companion to Mythology, London, 1992, p. 444: "Given these constraints, it's surprising at first to discover that twentieth-century women writers and artists constantly strive to engage with and re-figure women's representation in classical myth, and that a particular group of them have found inspiration in Graves and Neumann for their efforts (Sjöö, 1990; Orenstein, 1982; Stein, 1989; Walker, 1985, 1986; Daly, 1978; ...) ... If the projects of Graves and Neumann are in thrall to a masculinist representation of woman, why have so many women appropriated their theories? Perhaps certain feminist 'misread' or re-read these texts productively to formulate a position from which to write and speak, by taking the Jungians' essentialist propositions for truths about the repression of woman's nature by patriarchy. They could cast themselves as the bearers of secret feminine knowledge actually unavailable to male writers. However, this means that radical feminist claims of utter separatism are invalid, since their theories are predicated not on stories produced thousands of years ago by women, but on a masculine discourse of myth. In Donna Haraway's influential terms, these women may wish to be goddesses, but they are cyborgs all the same (Haraway, 1989).")

== Personal life ==
Walker was born Barbara Goodwin Jones in Philadelphia, Pennsylvania, on July 2, 1930. She studied journalism at the University of Pennsylvania, then worked for the Washington Star in Washington, D.C. While serving on a local hotline helping abused women and pregnant teenage girls in the mid-1970s, she became interested in feminism. Walker continued a personal study of comparative religions and feminist issues after she graduated which led to her writing The Woman's Encyclopedia of Myths and Secrets (1983). Walker described herself as an atheist.

She was married to Gordon Walker from 1952 until his death in 2017. They had a son.

Walker died on December 21, 2025, from metastatic abdominal cancer, in Sarasota, Florida.

== Awards and recognition ==
The American Humanist Association named her "Humanist Heroine" in 1993, and in 1995, she received the "Women Making Herstory" award from the New Jersey NOW.

== Bibliography ==
=== Knitting books ===
- A Treasury of Knitting Patterns (1968) ISBN 0-942018-16-8 (reprint edition 1998)
- A Second Treasury of Knitting Patterns (1970)
- The Craft of Lace Knitting (1971) ISBN 0-684-12503-X
- The Craft of Cable-Stitch Knitting (1971) ISBN 0-684-12500-5
- Knitting from the Top (1972) ISBN 0-942018-09-5 (reprint edition)
- The Craft of Multicolor Knitting (1973) ISBN 0-684-13405-5
- Sampler Knitting (1973) ISBN 0-684-13263-X (reprinted in A Fourth Treasury of Knitting Patterns (2000))
- Barbara Walker's Learn-to-Knit Afghan Book (1974) ISBN 0-942018-13-3 (reprint edition 1997)
- Mosaic Knitting (1976) ISBN 0-684-14243-0 (revised in 1997)
- A Second Treasury of Knitting Patterns (1985) ISBN 0-942018-17-6 (reprint edition 1998)
- Charted Knitting Designs: A Third Treasury of Knitting Patterns (1986) ISBN 0-942018-18-4 (reprint edition 1998)
- A Fourth Treasury of Knitting Patterns (2000) ISBN 0-942018-20-6 (includes Sampler Knitting (1973))
- Mosaic Knitting, Revised (2006) ISBN 0-942018-15-X

=== Neo-pagan feminist works ===
- The Woman's Encyclopedia of Myths and Secrets (1983) ISBN 0-06-250925-X
- The Secrets of the Tarot: Origins, History, and Symbolism (1984) ISBN 0-06-250927-6
- The I Ching of the Goddess (1986) ISBN 0-06-250924-1
- The Skeptical Feminist: Discovering the Virgin, Mother, and Crone (1987) ISBN 0-06-250932-2
- The Woman's Dictionary of Symbols and Sacred Objects (1988), Castle Books, ISBN 0-06-250923-3
- The Crone: Woman of Age, Wisdom, and Power (1988) ISBN 0-06-250934-9
- The Book of Sacred Stones: Fact and Fallacy in the Crystal World (1989, with Werner P. Brodde) ISBN 0-06-250921-7
- Women's Rituals: A Sourcebook (1990) ISBN 0-06-250939-X
- Restoring the Goddess: Equal Rites for Modern Women (2000) ISBN 1-57392-786-4
- The Essential Handbook of Women's Spirituality and Ritual (2001) ISBN 1-931412-64-2
- Man Made God: A Collection of Essays (2010) ISBN 0-9799631-4-1
- Belief and Unbelief (2014) ISBN 9780931779565

=== Novels and short stories ===
- Amazon: A Novel (1992) ISBN 0-06-250975-6
- Feminist Fairy Tales (1996) ISBN 0-06-251320-6

== Other works ==
- Barbara Walker Tarot Deck (Misc. Supplies) (1986) ISBN 1-931412-72-3
- I Ching of the Goddess: Divination Kit (Boxed Set with Cards) (2001) ISBN 1-931412-72-3
- Women And Religion: Sexism In The Christian Tradition (1997) - Freethought Today, January/February 1998.
- Walker, Barbara G. (2021). "Jesus Christ". In Loftus, John W.; Price, Robert M. (eds.). Varieties of Jesus Mythicism: Did He Even Exist?. Hypatia Press. ISBN 978-1839191589.

== See also ==
- Feminism
- Knitting
- Prehistoric religion
- Skepticism
