= Elizabeth Zimmermann =

Knitting designer and author (1910–1999)

- Elizabeth Zimmermann (photo by Walter Sheffer)
- Born: Elizabeth Lloyd-Jones; 9 August 1910; England
- Died: 30 November 1999 (aged 89); Marshfield, Wisconsin
- Known for: Knitting, designing, writing, teaching
- Children: Meg Swansen

Elizabeth Zimmermann (9 August 1910 – 30 November 1999) was a British-born hand knitting teacher and designer. She revolutionised the modern practice of knitting through her books and instructional series on American public television.

Though knitting back and forth on rigid straight needles was the norm, she advocated knitting in the round using flexible circular needles to produce seamless garments and to make it easier to knit intricate patterns. She also advocated the Continental knitting method, claiming that it is the most efficient and quickest way to knit. During World War II, German or continental knitting fell out of favor in the UK and US due to its association with Germany. Many English-language books on knitting are in the English or American style. Elizabeth Zimmermann helped to re-introduce continental style knitting to the United States.

== Early life ==
Born Elizabeth Lloyd-Jones in London, England, Zimmermann was the daughter of a British naval officer; her mother invented Meals by Motor, one of the earliest businesses delivering meals to peoples homes. Zimmermann attended boarding school in England and art schools in Switzerland and Germany. Her autobiographical "Digressions" in the book Knitting Around reprinted many of her original artworks alongside the text. Zimmermann learned to knit first from her mother and aunts (English Style) and then later from her Swiss governess (German or Continental Style).

== Career ==
=== Business ===
Zimmermann immigrated to the United States from England in 1937 with her new husband, German brewery master Arnold Zimmermann. The Zimmermanns initially settled in New York and eventually moved across country, finally settling in Wisconsin in a converted schoolhouse which would become home to Schoolhouse Press, a mail-order knitting business still based in the schoolhouse and run by her daughter Meg Swansen.

=== Initiatives ===
Zimmermann is credited with knitting the first example of an Aran sweater seen in an American magazine (Vogue Knitting). (While it may have been the first item knitted, another pattern had been published 2 years previously.) The pattern for which Zimmermann knitted the model was published in Vogue Pattern Book in 1958, while a collection of patterns for men's and women's Aran sweaters with matching socks and mittens, entitled "Hand Knits from the Aran Islands," was published in a 1956 issue of Woman's Day.

According to her posthumously published book The Opinionated Knitter, a yarn-company editor altered Zimmermann's circular knitting instructions for a Fair Isle Yoke pullover after she submitted the sweater, rendering it in the back-and-forth "flat" knitting method that was more popular among American knitters at the time. This alteration led Zimmermann to begin to publish her own instructions as free Newsletters to her customers, later transforming these into longer form, titled Wool Gatherings.

=== US television ===
Zimmermann's PBS knitting series, Knitting Workshop, is still available on VHS and DVD. In one episode, a police officer (and friend of the family) pulled Zimmermann and her husband over for "knitting without a license." (Always knitting, she'd even developed the ability to knit while on the back of her husband's motorcycle.) In The Opinionated Knitter, Zimmermann's daughter Meg notes that while her mother wanted to call her first book The Opinionated Knitter, her publishers changed it to Knitting Without Tears. However, the former perhaps best expresses Zimmermann's knitting philosophy. In all her published works (print and video), she encouraged knitters to experiment and develop their own patterns and ideas, letting their latent creativity unfold.

== Legacy ==
=== EPS ===
Zimmermann devised her calculation, later called Elizabeth's Percentage System (EPS), for sizing garments based on gauge and desired body circumference. EPS is still widely used by designers; it consists of a mathematical formula to determine how many stitches to cast on for a sweater, given that the sleeves and body are usually proportionate no matter what yarn or gauge is used.

EPS was central to Zimmermann's mandate that knitters think for themselves, knit without patterns, make independent design decisions, and improvise as they knit, elevating their skills and work to that of a true craft.

=== Original patterns ===
Other patterns and techniques for which she is well known are the so-called "Pi Shawl," a circular shawl that Zimmermann claimed was formed by regularly spaced increases based on Pi -- as she said in her book Knitter's Almanac, "The geometry of the circle hing[es] on the mysterious relationship of the circumference of a circle to its radius. A circle will double its circumference in infinitely themselves-doubling distances, or, in knitters' terms, the distance between the increase-rounds, in which you double the number of stitches, goes 3, 6, 12, 24 and so on." The shawl is not, however, based on Pi in any special way, but only on the property common to all two-dimensional shapes in Euclidean geometry that all dimensions increase by the same factor at the same rate; the circular shape is simply created by regularly spacing the increases. Zimmermann is also known for the "i-cord" (or "idiot cord"), and the "Baby Surprise Jacket," which is knitted completely flat and then folded, origami-style, to create a shaped jacket. She is also credited with introducing the Mobius scarf, a continuous one-sided cowl knit as a rectangular strip, then attached end to end by rotating one end 180 degrees.

In 1974, Zimmermann founded a series of knitting camps that continue to this day under her daughter's direction. Her motto was: "Knit on with confidence and hope, through all crises."

Elizabeth Zimmermann died in Marshfield, Wisconsin, on 30 November 1999 at the age of 89. In her obituary in The New York Times Douglas Martin wrote, "Mrs. Zimmermann chose to play down her influence on knitting, coining the term unventions for her woolly inventions."

A retrospective exhibit, "New School Knitting: The Influence of Elizabeth Zimmermann and Schoolhouse Press," was presented at the University of Wisconsin-Madison Gallery of Design in 2006.

== Works ==
- Zimmermann, Elizabeth (1995) [1971]. Knitting Without Tears. New York: Simon & Schuster. ISBN 0-684-13505-1. OCLC 475746806.
- —— (1981) [1974]. Knitter's Almanac. New York: Dover Publications. ISBN 0-486-24178-5. OCLC 851977417.
- —— (1981). Knitting Workshop. Pittsville, Wisconsin: Schoolhouse Press. ISBN 0-942018-00-1.
- —— (2001) [1989]. Knitting Around. Pittsville, Wisconsin: Schoolhouse Press. ISBN 0-942018-03-6.
- —— (2005). The Opinionated Knitter: Elizabeth Zimmermann Newsletters 1958-1968. Pittsville, Wisconsin: Schoolhouse Press. ISBN 0-942018-26-5.
