= Combined knitting =

Knitting method

Combined knitting or combination knitting is a knitting method that combines elements of Eastern-style knitting with the Western techniques. The name was suggested by Mary Thomas in her 1938 book Mary Thomas's Knitting Book, where she described the method as "... the better way to work in Flat Knitting. The resulting fabric is more even and closer in construction." By wrapping the yarn the opposite way while purling, the knitter changes the orientation of the resulting loops; then the next row's knit stitches can be formed by inserting the needle through the back leg (as in Eastern knitting), rather than through the front leg, without twisting the stitch. This method is suitable for all knitted fabrics from the basic stockinette stitch, to any other technique, such as Fair Isle, circular knitting, or lace knitting.

The basic adaptation necessary is to substitute "ssk" when directed to "k2tog", and vice versa, to orient the slant of the decrease correctly. Most American and European knitting patterns are currently [when?] not written to accommodate the needs of combined knitters. The responsibility rests with the individual knitter to have gained sufficient working knowledge of the changes necessary to convert pattern elements before attempting the entire project, in order for the design to be knitted successfully.

Knitting instructors unfamiliar with this method will encounter difficulties teaching classes with students using this method. Proper terminology is essential in assisting teachers to provide adequate instruction to these students. Teachers should familiarize themselves with the works of Annie Modesitt and Anna Zilboorg, among others.

== See also ==
- English knitting (or "throwing")
- Continental knitting (or "picking").
