= Fair Isle (knitting) =

Traditional British knitting style

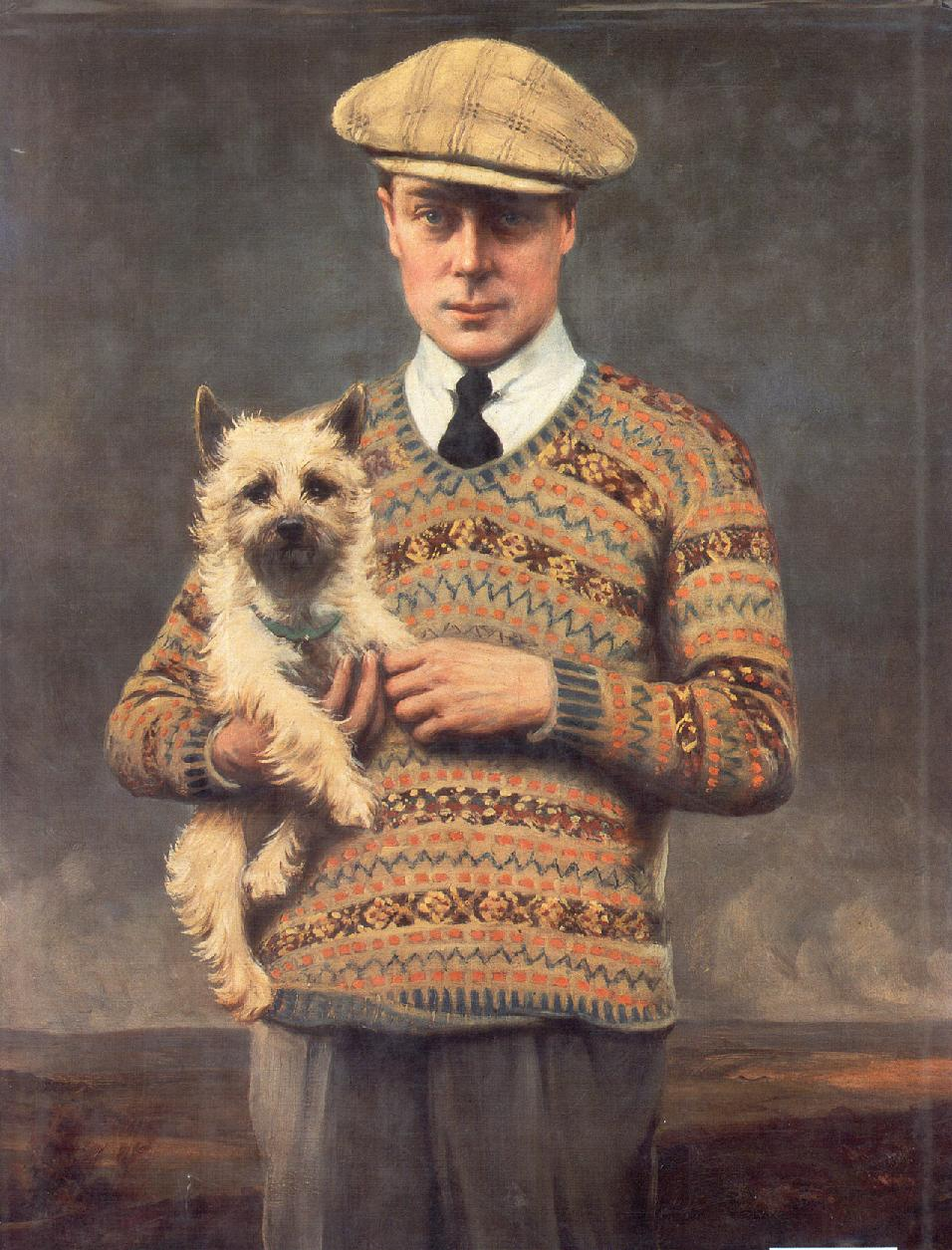
1925 portrait by John St Helier Lander of the Prince of Wales (later Edward VIII) in a Fair Isle jumper

Fair Isle (/fɛəraɪ̯l/) is a traditional knitting style used to create patterns with multiple colours. It is named after Fair Isle, one of the Shetland Islands. Fair Isle knitting gained popularity when the Prince of Wales (later King Edward VIII) wore Fair Isle jumpers in public in 1921. Traditional Fair Isle patterns have a limited palette of five or so colours, use only two colours per row, are worked in the round, and limit the length of a run of any particular colour.

Some people use the term "Fair Isle" to refer to any colour work knitting where stitches are knitted alternately in various colours, with the unused colours stranded across the back of the work, but this is inaccurate. The term "stranded colour work" is applicable for the generic technique, and the term "Fair Isle" is reserved for the characteristic patterns of Shetland.

Other techniques for knitting in colour include intarsia, slip-stitch colour (also known as mosaic knitting).

== Technique ==
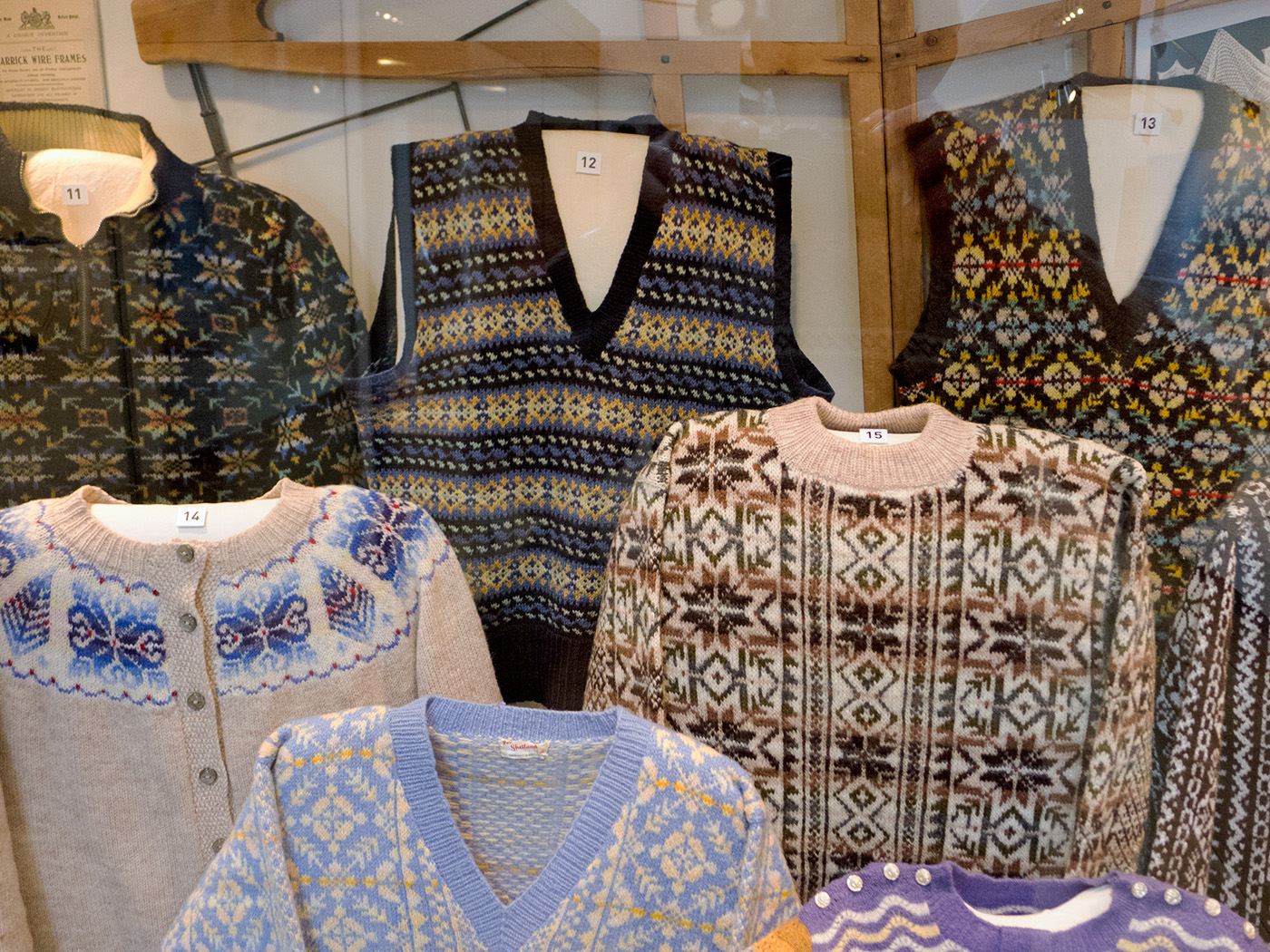
Fair Isle knitwear in Shetland Museum

Basic two-colour Fair Isle requires no additional techniques beyond the basic knit stitch: the purl stitch is not used if the garment is knit in the round. At each knit stitch, there are two available "active" colours of yarn; one is drawn through to make the knit stitch, and the other is simply held behind the piece, carried as a loose strand of yarn behind the just-made stitch. To avoid "loose" strands larger than 3-5 stitches, the yarn not in use can be "caught" by the yarn in use without this being seen on the front of the work. Knitters who are comfortable with both English style and Continental style knitting can carry one colour with their right hand and one with their left, although it is also possible to simply use two different fingers for the two colours of yarn and knit both using the same style.

The simplest Fair Isle pattern uses circular or double pointed needles, cast on any number of stitches. Knitting then continues in the round, with the colours alternated every stitch. If the pattern is started with an even number of stitches, a vertically striped tube of fabric will be formed, while an odd number will create a diagonal grid that appears to mix the two colours.

Traditional Fair Isle patterns normally had no more than three consecutive stitches of any given colour, because they were stranded, and too many consecutive stitches of one colour mean a very long strand of the other, quite easy to catch with a finger or button. A more modern variation is woven Fair Isle, where the unused strand is held in slightly different positions relative to the needles and thereby woven into the fabric, still invisible from the front but trapped closely against the back of the piece. This permits a nearly limitless variety of pattern with considerably larger blocks of colour.

Traditionally, Fair Isle jumper construction involves knitting the body of the jumper completely in the round. Steeks (from the Scottish word meaning 'stitch', 'to close shut', and comprising several stitches) are worked across the armhole openings allowing the body to be completed in the round without interruption. Once the main body of the jumper is complete, the armhole steeks are cut open. Steeks are secured to prevent unravelling of stitches, either before or after cutting. Stitches are then picked up around the armhole opening and the sleeve is knitted down toward the cuff in the round.

Since the 1990s, the term ‘Fair Isle’ has been applied very generally and loosely to any stranded colour knitting regardless of its relation to the knitting of Fair Isle or any of the other Shetland Islands. This, however, is inaccurate. "Many people use the term Fair Isle when they mean stranded knitting, and this is inaccurate. Fair Isle is a very specific type of stranded knitting from Fair Isle, a tiny island in the north of Scotland and part of the Shetland Islands. In Fair Isle knitting, only 2 colors are used per round and yarn is carried for a limited number of stitches across the back of the work. Common motifs are OXO shapes, ‘peeries’ or simplified geometric shapes inspired by nature. Although only two colors are worked together on any given round, designs often incorporate more colors, up to as many as 10 for some very complex Fair Isle designs."

== See also ==
- Gumbys
