= Adella Colvin =

American textile artist

Adella Colvin is an American yarn dyer.

== Career ==
Colvin first began knitting at 34, at the suggestion of an older neighbor after her husband was deployed to Afghanistan and Colvin wanted to find a hobby. The two visited a yarn shop together, and Colvin was impressed with the quality of the yarn. When Colvin, who is Black, entered a yarn shop for the first time without her neighbor, who is white, the white owner of the shop met her at the door and told her the restroom was only for customers. Colvin left and decided to shop online and soon became interested in dyeing her own yarn.

When other knitters became interested in her hand-dyes, she opened an Etsy shop in 2015, electing not to use her photo in the shop's profile due to concerns about perceptions in the majority white knitting community that products by Black artisans were inferior. Her daughter, nicknamed LolaBean, was born in 2016, and Colvin, "thinking about the legacy she was building," decided to rebrand, naming her business after her daughter and having a logo professionally designed featuring an image of the baby, who is portrayed as clearly Black. In 2017 Colvin was featured by knitting influencer Gaye Glasspie, which brought Colvin to the attention of yarn shop owners and knitters nationwide. In 2019 Glasspie, who is known as GG, introduced Colvin to Felicia Eve, one of the few Black yarn shop owners in the US, and Eve gave Colvin a trunk show, which sold out.

Colvin has collaborated with Stephen West, a pattern designer who created a pattern for a custom colorway of LolaBean's.

During the George Floyd protests, when there were images of white protesters standing between police and Black protesters, GG started a hashtag, #StandintheGap, that encouraged white people to "offer that kind of protection in everyday life," and Colvin's wholesale accounts went from 1 to 30 with a waiting list as of October 2020 of more than 70.

As of October 2020 Colvin's yarns were carried by yarn shops throughout the US.

== Social media presence ==
In November 2021, knitting influencer Kristy Glass posted questions on her Instagram about why Michelle Obama, who'd been featured on that month's cover of Vogue Knitting, wasn't photographed in knitwear and appeared to have her wedding ring on her right hand. Vogue had featured "only a handful" of Black knitters on its cover in almost 90 years, and many Black knitters found the questions hypercritical. Colvin posted a response on her own Instagram that such comments emphasized the fact the knitting community was predominantly white and made Black people feel hyperscrutinized. Glass responded by posting a series of direct messages she'd had with Colvin with the caption, "For the record." Colvin responded with "You post those DMs thinking they're supposed to hurt me but have your comments restricted where nobody can comment?", and called Glass a racist. Glass soon closed her social media accounts. A knitting influencer whose handle is Deplorable Knitter, who posts to a YouTube channel called Politically Incorrect Knitters, accused Colvin of "raising profit off controversy." In the wake of the incident Colvin cancelled her recent wholesale orders and planned to investigate her suppliers and the outlets for her products more closely to determine "which are actually committed to racial justice and which are only paying it lip service."

== Personal life ==
Colvin is African-American and Puerto Rican. She is originally from New York City. She is married and lives in Grovetown, Georgia with her husband, an Army veteran who works in cybersecurity. She has a daughter born in 2016 and two stepchildren.
