= Baby Surprise Jacket =

Knitting pattern

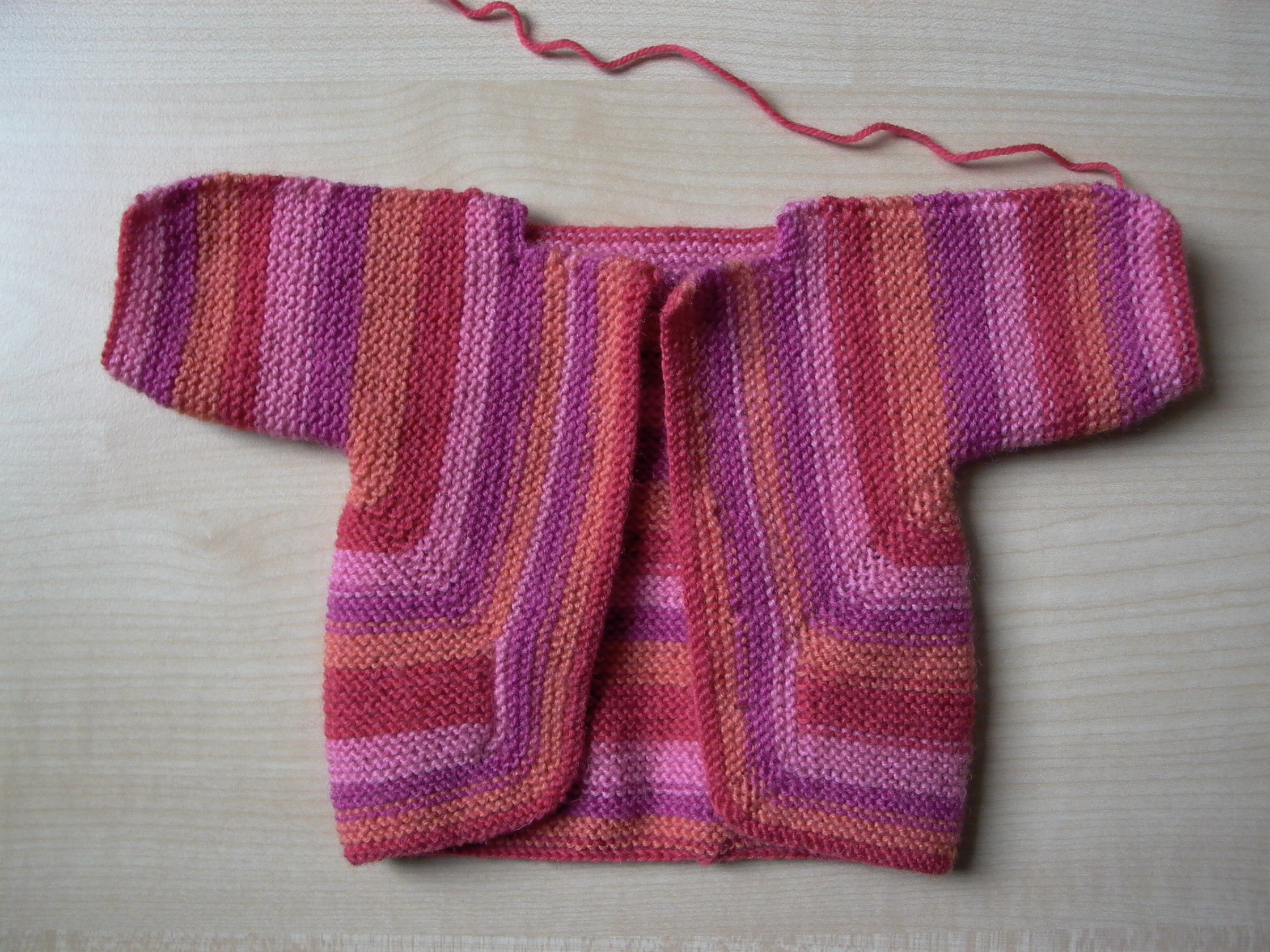
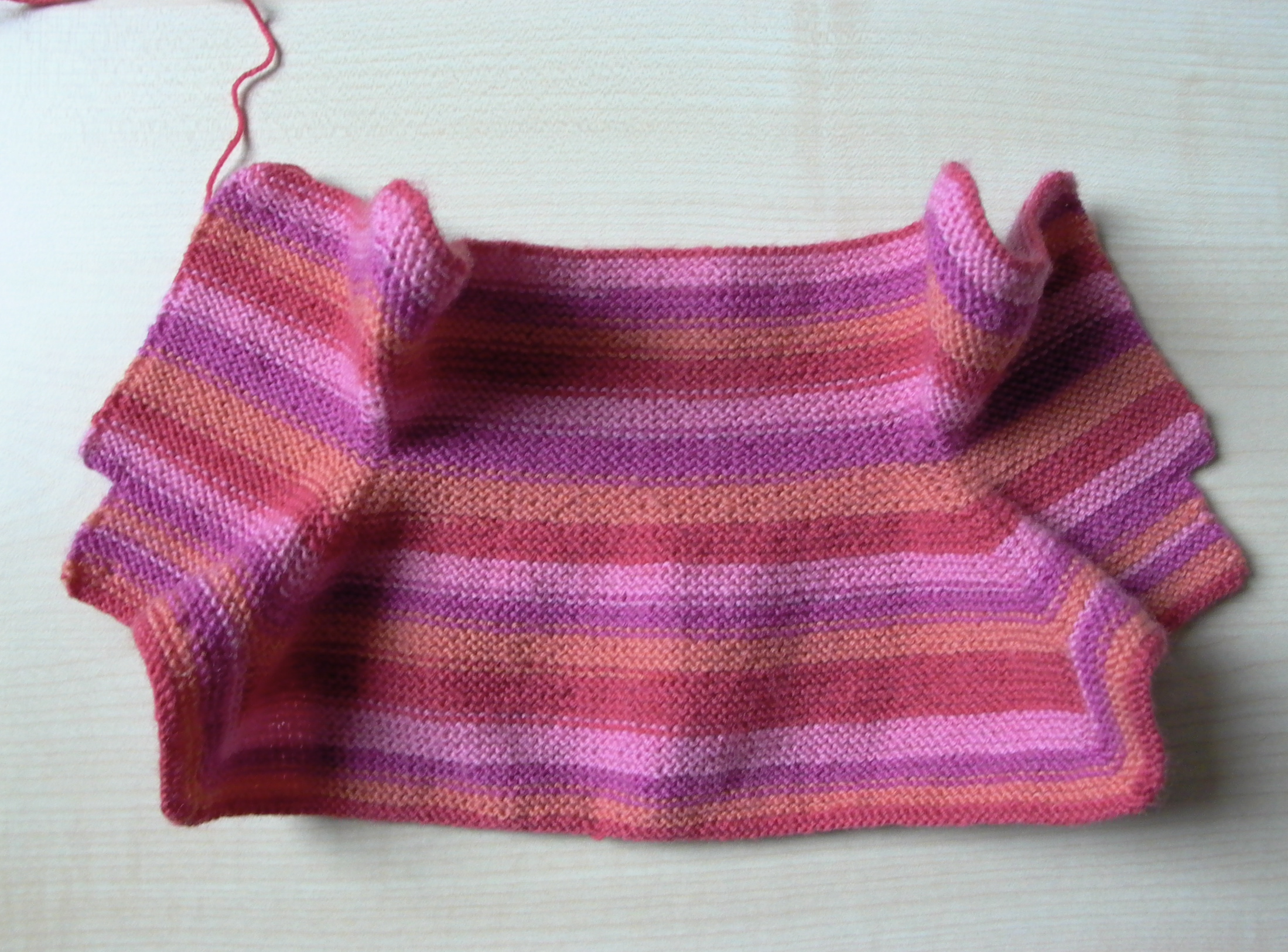
The Baby Surprise Jacket, before (below) and after (above) being folded.

The Baby Surprise Jacket, abbreviated as BSJ and also known as Elizabeth Zimmermann's Baby Surprise, is a knitting pattern for an infant sweater designed by British knitter Elizabeth Zimmermann. The Baby Surprise Jacket is regarded as both a classic American knitting pattern with a distinctive construction, one of Zimmermann's most popular patterns and one of archetypical of her style. It has accrued a fanbase on the internet.

== Description ==
The Baby Surprise jacket has a distinctive construction; it is knitted flat (back and forth on two needles) in garter stitch as one piece, then folded and seamed up to form the final jacket shape. The original 1968 version of the pattern gave a series of steps for the knitter to follow, more akin to an algorithm than a traditional pattern. The 2009 re-release had step by step instructions for all 97 pattern rows.

== Pattern and publication history ==
Zimmermann designed the Baby Surprise Jacket pattern in anticipation of the birth of her first grandchild, Cully Swansen, son of Meg Swansen. Zimmermann had been attempting to design a bonnet at the time, but found that the resulting garment, when folded, was reminiscent of a sweater. She gave it its name because "it looks like nothing on Earth when you have finished knitting it".

The pattern was first published in 1968 as part Zimmermann's Newsletter and Leaflet #21, then re-published in the spring 1989 and fall 1999 editions of Knitter's Magazine. It was posthumously republished by Schoolhouse Press in 2009, It was included in the 2013 updated edition of Zimmermann's Knitting Workshop. Zimmermann's grandson, Cully Swansen, designed a modified circular, stranded, version that was published that same year.

== Legacy ==
The Baby Surprise is one of Zimmermann's most popular patterns, archetypical of her style. It is considered a classic American knitting pattern. During the twenty-first century, accrued a fanbase on the internet, especially on the knitting database and social media site Ravelry. As of 2012, there were over 16,000 Baby Surprise Jackets recorded on the website. By 2014, that number had increased to over 20,000. In 2015, Yarn magazine described knitting the pattern as a "rite of passage" for knitters.
