= BSJ =

BSJ is an acronym that can stand for:

- Bairnsdale Airport
- Ballet San Jose, formerly Ballet San Jose Silicon Valley
- Bibliothèque Saint-Jean
- Bachelor of Science, Journalism
- Bedford St Johns railway station
- Benjamin St-Juste (born 1997), Canadian player of American football
- Boy Scouts of Japan, a former name of the Scout Association of Japan
- Berkeley Scientific Journal, the undergraduate science journal of the University of California, Berkeley
- Baby Surprise Jacket, a knitting pattern
