= Nicky Epstein =

American knitting designer and author

Nicky Epstein is a knitting designer and author of books on knitting. She is known for her creative combinations of knitting stitches, and for the colorful patterns often found in her sweaters, especially involving applique of separately knitted motifs. In 2005, she was given an award by the National NeedleArts Association. In 2006, her work was included in a retrospective fashion show at the Museum of Arts and Design in New York City. Since the (winter) Holiday 2005 issue, Epstein has written a regular column in Vogue Knitting called "Nicky Epstein".

== Early life ==
Nicoletta Quinones was born into an Italian/Spanish family and grew up in a mining town in West Virginia. Her Italian grandmother taught her to knit, and she completed her first sweater in seventh grade with the guidance of her home economics teacher. Epstein's mastery of knitting techniques began, however, when she was fourteen, with lessons from a local Spanish woman.

In 1970, Epstein enrolled at the Columbus College of Art and Design to study fashion design, but switched to retail sales and fine art. She continued to knit in college and earned money for tuition by selling oil paintings.

In 1979, she was art director at a design firm when she entered a McCall's Needlework design contest with a unicorn sweater and won first prize. Since the early 1980s, Epstein has published many knitting designs, sometimes over fifty a year.

She is married to Howard Epstein and lives in New York City.

== Contributions to knitting ==
Epstein has long been respected as a knitter and designer, and has been quoted as saying, "I will support anything that promotes knitting." Since 1999, she has published a series of technical books on knitting, focusing on applique ornaments and borders of knitted garments, which are renowned for their creativity. More recently, she has begun to explore other areas of knitting, such as felting. Epstein has also authored popular books on making knitted or crocheted clothes for Barbie dolls, as well as sundry projects for the home, such as afghan blankets and Christmas stockings.

== Bibliography ==
- Epstein, Nicky (1999). Nicky Epstein's Knitted Embellishments: 350 Appliqués, Borders, Cords and more!. Loveland CO: Interweave Press. ISBN 978-1-883010-39-3.
- Epstein, Nicky (2004). Knitting on the Edge: Ribs, Ruffles, Lace, Fringes, Floral, Points & Picots: The Essential Collection of 350 Decorative Borders. New York: Sixth and Spring Books. ISBN 978-1-931543-40-8.
- Epstein, Nicky (2005). Knitting Over The Edge: Unique Ribs, Cords, Appliques, Colors, Nouveau. New York: Sixth and Spring Books. ISBN 978-1-931543-75-0.
- Epstein, Nicky (2006). Knitting Beyond the Edge: Cuffs and Collars*Necklines*Hems*Closures - The Essential Collection of Decorative Finishes. New York: Sixth and Spring Books. ISBN 978-1-933027-01-2.
- Epstein, Nicky (2006). Nicky Epstein's Knitted Flowers. New York: Sixth and Spring Books. ISBN 978-1-931543-88-0.
- Epstein, Nicky (2007). Knitting Never Felt Better: The Definitive Guide to Fabulous Felting. New York: Sixth and Spring Books. ISBN 978-1-933027-11-1.
