= Norah Gaughan =

American hand knitting pattern designer (born 1961)

- Born: January 30, 1961 (age 65); New York City, New York, U.S.
- Known for: knitting

Norah Gaughan (born January 30, 1961, in New York City) is an American hand knitting pattern designer.

== Early life ==
She is the younger child of Phoebe Gaughan, artist and needlework illustrator, and Jack Gaughan, illustrator of fantasy and science fiction books and magazines. Gaughan first learned to knit at the age of 14, while she and a friend avoided a heat wave by staying indoors for the day and knitting to pass the time.

She studied Biochemistry and Art at Brown University and, remaining in Providence, Rhode Island, was associated with hand knitting designers Deborah Newton and Marjery Winter.

== Knitting career ==
As a freelance designer, she published designs in Vogue Knitting and Woman's World magazines and the magazines and single pattern flyers of Reynolds and Bernat yarn companies. She also worked for Adrienne Vittadini, JCA Yarns, and was the design director at Berroco Yarns from 2005 to 2014.

== Design ==
Although previously known to hand knitters for her knitting patterns, following the 2006 publication of her book Knitting Nature: 39 Designs Inspired by Patterns in Nature she became internationally known.

Her designs are often based upon the mathematical expressions underlying natural patterns as opposed to naturalistic visual impressions. They are complex in origin but not necessarily so in execution or appearance. She has an innovative use of texture and stitch combinations, often creating new knitting stitches for her designs. Her work has been described as recognizable on sight.
