= Continental knitting =

Style of knitting

Knitting with the yarn in one's left hand is commonly referred to as Continental knitting, German knitting, European knitting, or left-hand knitting. Unlike English knitting, the yarn is held in the left hand. This allows advanced knitters to scoop the working yarn through without wrapping it around the needle first. This is often referred to as picking. Continental knitting is often preferred by hand-knitters, as it is among the more efficient methods, requiring the shortest number of specific hand motions per stitch.

Continental-style knitting, being associated with Germany, fell out of favour in English-speaking countries during World War II; its reintroduction in the United States has often been credited to Elizabeth Zimmermann.

== Hand motions ==
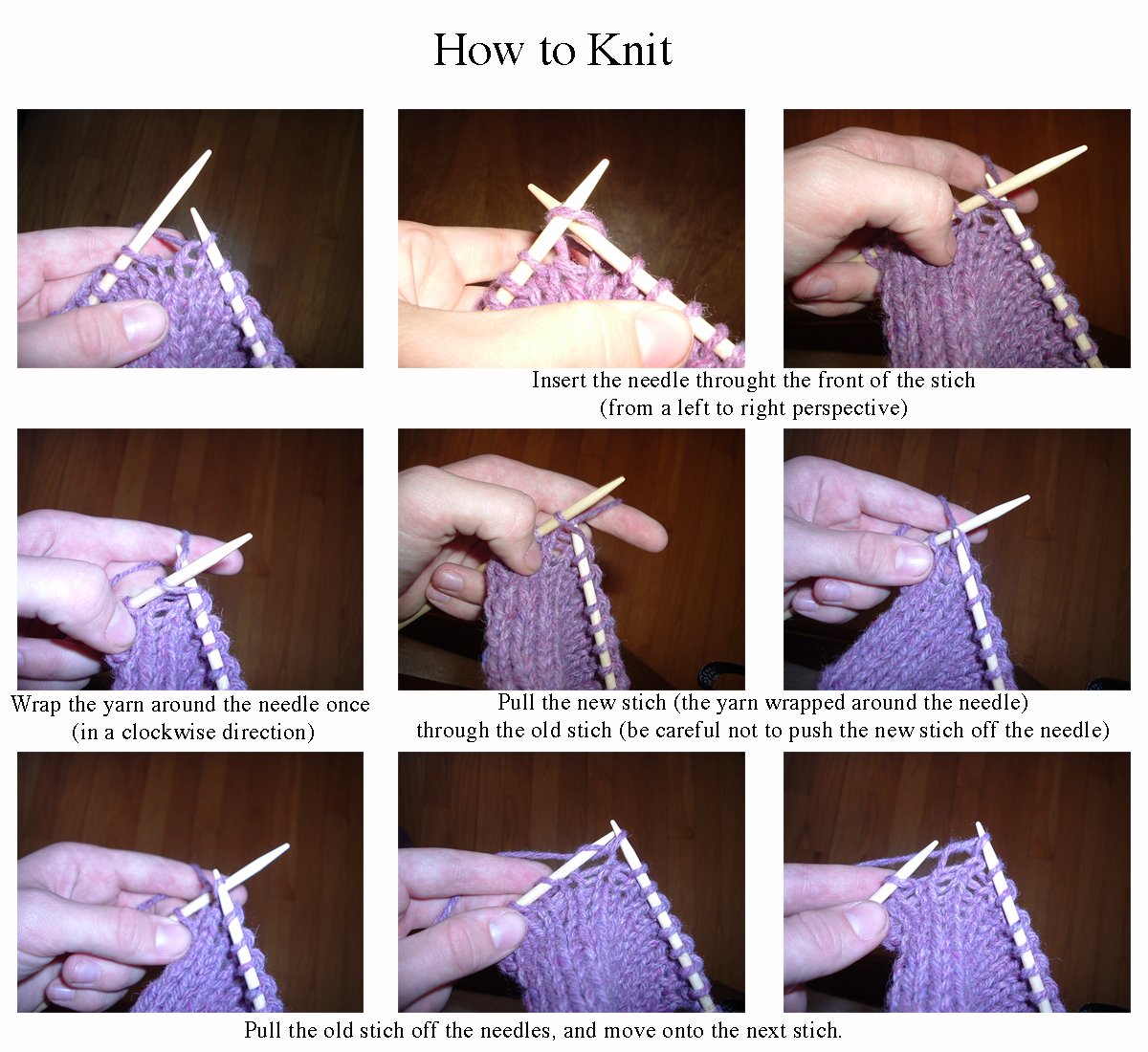
Illustration of how to knit

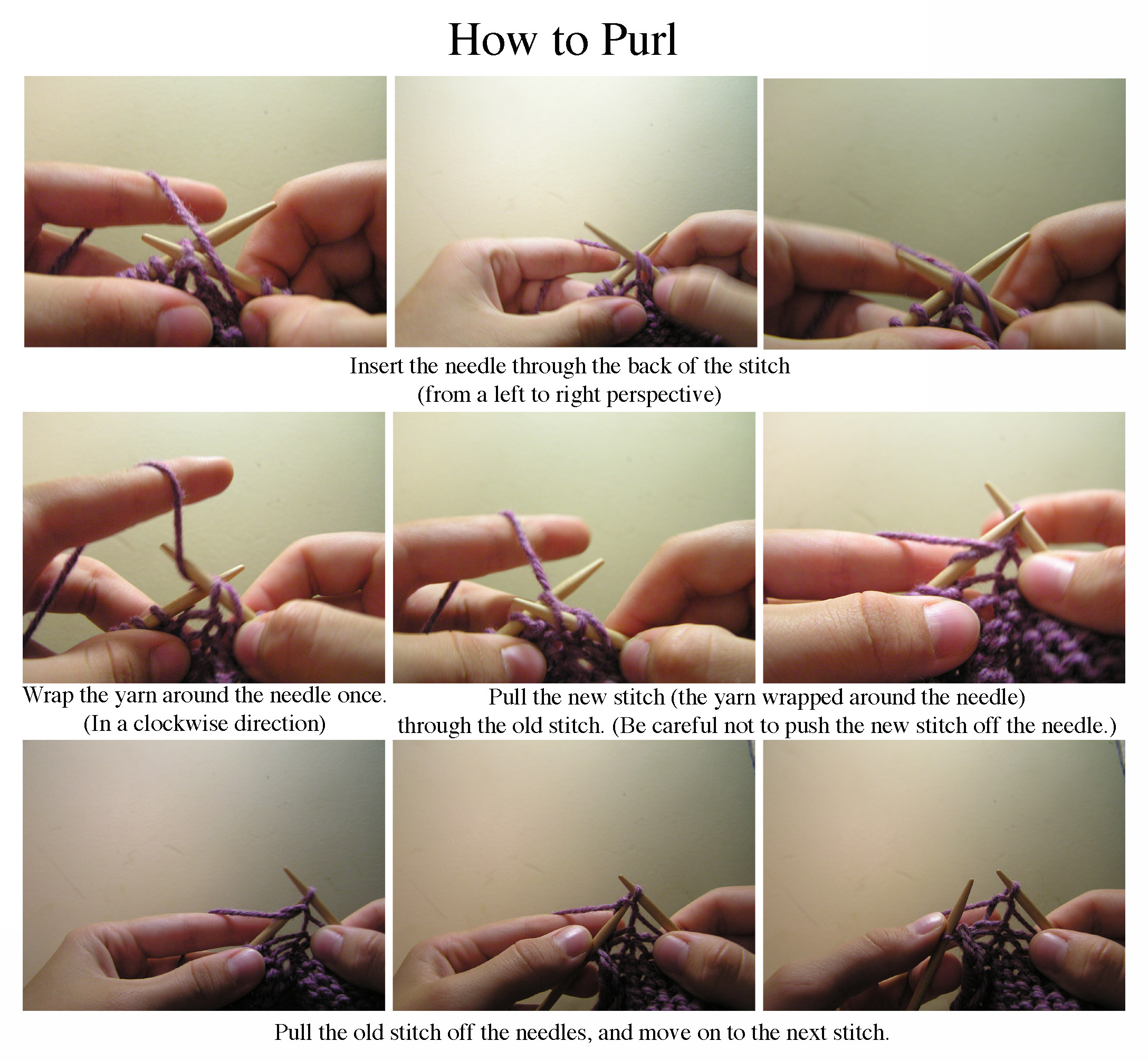
Illustration of how to purl

The motion of the right wrist is used to slip the right needle into the loop of the stitch being knitted and 'scoop' or 'hook' the yarn onto the right needle. An alternative method of collecting the yarn involves using the thumb or index finger of the right hand to hold the yarn in place as the new stitch is being pulled out of the loop.

This knitting style is often easier to learn for people with crocheting experience, since the way the yarn is held in the left hand is similar to crochet, and the motion of the right hand is similar to the motion seen in crochet. One major difference in the motion of the right wrist is that in crochet the crochet hook may be held more like a pencil; this method of holding the knitting needle like a pencil was briefly made popular around 1900 because it was considered more ladylike. Nowadays, however, the majority of knitters hold both needles under the palm.

== Yarn tension ==
The tension in the yarn is controlled by threading the yarn through the fingers of the left hand. Typically, the yarn is looped around the little finger and over the index finger. Some knitters wrap the yarn around the index finger only one or two times.

== History ==
This style originated in continental Europe, specifically recognized in Germany, but is also found to a significant degree in the English-speaking world. It is widely used in Scandinavia and Eastern Europe.

Other knitting styles include English knitting (aka right-hand knitting) and combined knitting.
