= Vogue Knitting =

US magazine

- The Holiday 2011 cover featuring Martha Stewart
- Editor in Chief: Norah Gaughan
- Former editors: Carla Scott, Trisha Malcolm
- Categories: Arts and Crafts
- Frequency: 2x
- Publisher: David Joinnides
- Founder: Conde Montrose Nast
- Founded: 1932
- First issue: 1932
- Company: SoHo Publishing LLC
- Country: United States
- Based in: New York City
- Language: English
- Website: www.vogueknitting.com
- ISSN: 0890-9237

Vogue Knitting, also known as Vogue Knitting International, is a magazine about knitting published by SoHo Publishing LLC. It is published biannually and includes knitting designs, yarn reviews, and interviews with designers. Vogue International Knitting is a registered trademark of Advance Publications Inc. and is used under a license.

Originally launched in 1932 by Conde Nast, the magazine shuttered in 1969. It was relaunched in 1982 by the Butterick Company, which had purchased Vogue Patterns. Publisher and marketing director, Art Joinnides, saw the market potential for a knitting title. Since the Winter 2020/2021 issue, the magazine is edited by Norah Gaughan, and has its headquarters in New York City.

== Events ==
The editors of Vogue Knitting launched Vogue Knitting Live in 2011, a fan convention. It takes place primarily in New York and Seattle. Classes, demonstrations and vendor marketplace are held as part of the convention, along with a fashion show. Currently the events are held virtually due to Covid-19 restrictions

Vogue Knitting offers tours with travel opportunities. Their tours allow knitters to experience travel with benefits of workshops, guest speakers, specialty yarn shopping experiences, and excursions to textile manufacturers, mills and more.

== Digital media ==
- Vogue Knitting Knitterviews podcasts
- Vogue Knitting Magazine app

== Notable contributors ==
- Debbie Bliss
- Nicky Epstein
- Norah Gaughan
- Alice Starmore
- Meg Swansen
- Stephen West

== Books ==
Vogue Knitting: The Ultimate Knitting Book. New York. Sixth & Spring Books. 2018
