= Slip-stitch knitting =

Family of knitting techniques

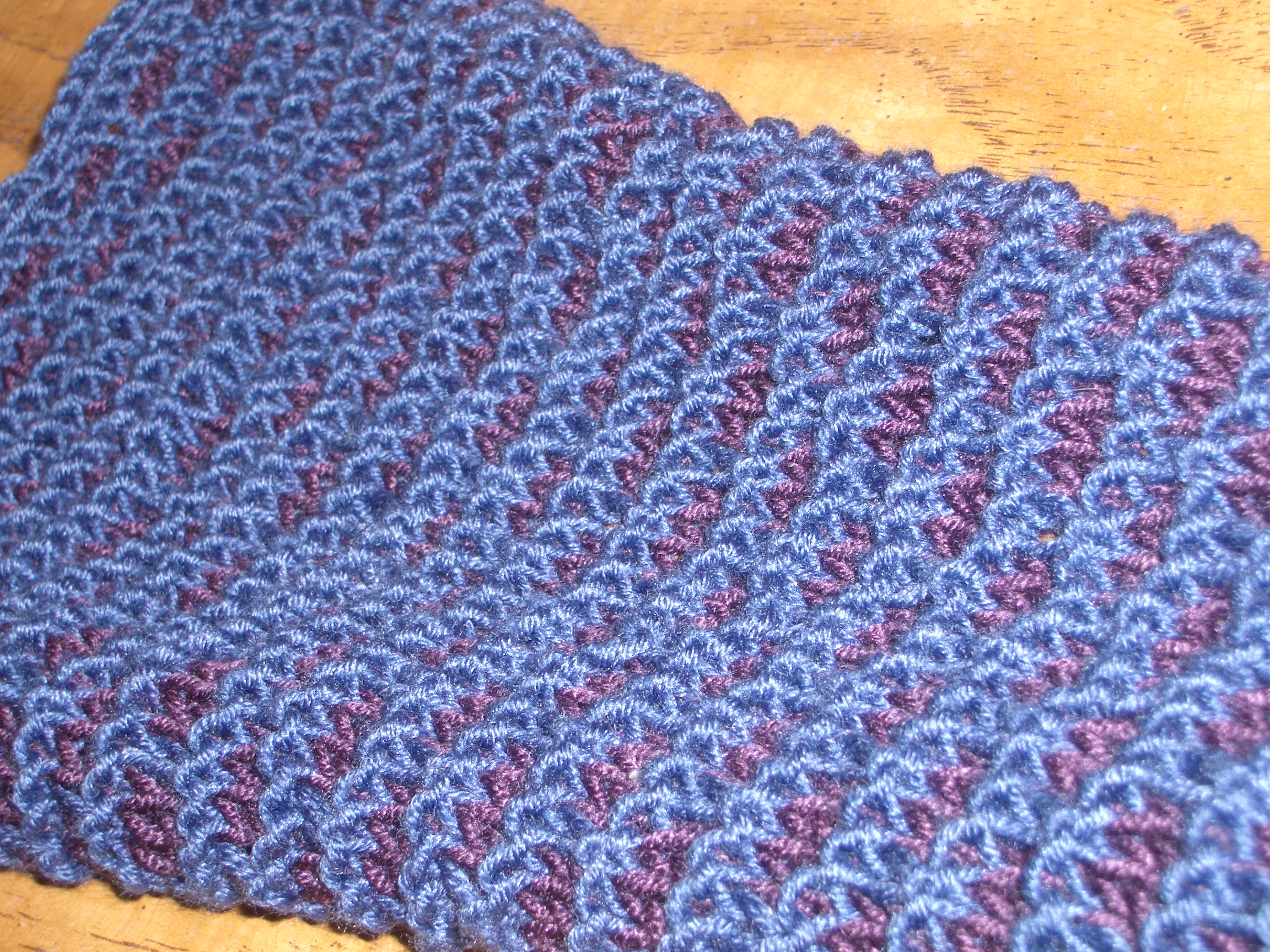
A scarf made using a slip-stitch pattern to create elongated stitches.

Slip-stitch knitting is a family of knitting techniques that uses slip stitches to make multiple fabrics simultaneously, to make extra-long stitches, and/or to carry over colors from an earlier row.

== Basic methods ==
In the basic slip stitch, the stitch is passed from the left needle to the right needle without being knitted. The yarn may be passed invisibly behind the slipped stitch (wyib="with yarn in back") or in front of the slipped stitch (wyif="with yarn in front"), where it produces a small horizontal "bar". The wyif slipped stitch is less common, although several knitting patterns use it to produce a visual effect like woven cloth. Alternatively, the yarn can be "tucked", i.e., made into a yarn-over that is knitted together with the slipped stitch on the next row; like the simpler wyib, this is invisible.

If knitted on the next row, the wyib slipped stitch is twice as tall as its neighboring stitches. A vertical column of such "double-height" stitches is a nice accent, e.g., on a scarf or in a sweater, particularly in a contrasting color.

== Double knitting with slip stitches ==
Slip stitches may be used for an easier method of double knitting that requires only one yarn be handled at one time. As a concrete example, consider a two-color pattern with a multiple of four stitches (labeled ABCD) being knit on double-pointed circular needles. On the first row, using color 1, stitch A is knitted, stitch B is purled, stitch C is slipped wyib and stitch D is slipped wyif. The knitter then slides the stitches back to the beginning (recall that the needles are double-pointed). Then, using color 2, stitch A is slipped wyib, stitch B is slipped wyif, stitch C is knitted and stitch D is purled. The knitter then turns the work and repeats indefinitely. The knitted and slipped wyib stitches come forward, whereas the purled and wyif stitches recede, resulting in a (very warm!) double-knit scarf alternating in the two colors with beautiful drape. The knit and purl stitches produce the front and back fabrics, respectively, of the double-knitted fabric while the slipped stitches allow for the alternation of color.

An even simpler slip-stitch pattern generates two fabrics at once on the same needle. Consider the pattern: * knit 1, slip 1 wyif *. At the end of the row, turn the work. Then knit the stitches that were slipped and slip (again wyif) the stitches that were knitted. In the end, one should obtain a "pocket" that can be opened (be sure to use wyif slip-stitches during binding off as well!) The wyif slip stitch prevents the yarn from crossing over to the back fabric, so that only the front fabric is knitted in any row. This is probably the secret technique of Anna Makarovna from Leo Tolstoy's War and Peace, who always knit two socks simultaneously

When the pair was finished, she made a solemn ceremony of pulling one stocking out of the other in the presence of the children.

== Mosaic knitting ==
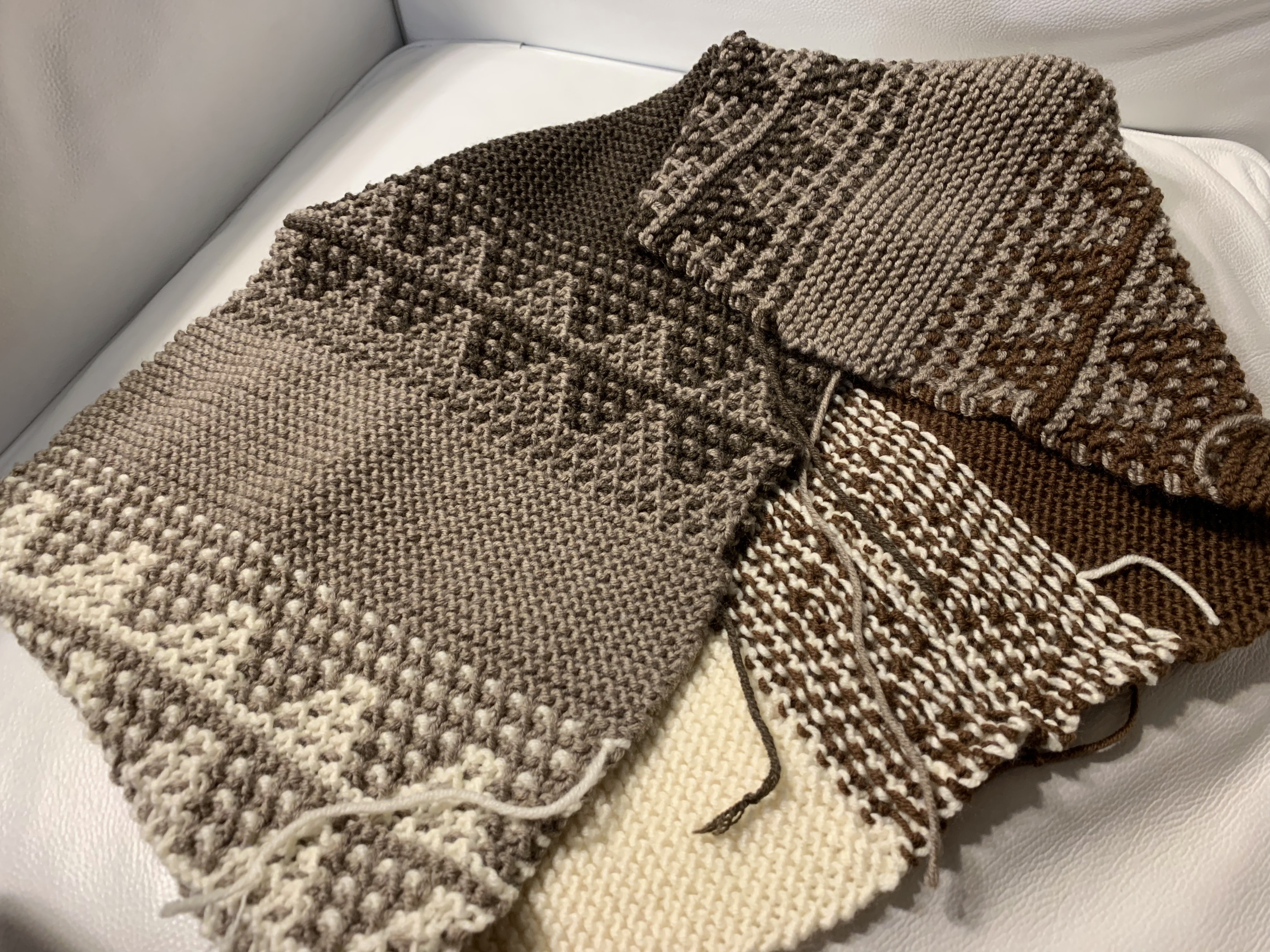
Front and back of a cowl created using panels of mosaic knitting and garter stitch

Mosaic knitting uses two colors (usually both held at one side), but only one yarn is handled at one time. Let the first and second yarns be called "black" and "white" for specificity, although any two colors may be used. The knitter casts on an entirely white row. The knitter then introduces the black yarn and knits two rows, across and back. If a white stitch is desired at a given position, the stitch (from the white row below) is slipped wyib; by contrast, if a black stitch is desired, the stitch is knitted using the black yarn. The second (return) row repeats the slip/knit choices of the first row, effectively giving double height. (Note that, on the return row, the stitches are slipped wyif, since the fabric is being knitted from the wrong side.) The knitter then takes up the white yarn and knits two rows, across and back. Now if a white stitch is desired at a given position, the stitch is knitted with the white yarn; by contrast, if a black stitch is desired, the stitch is slipped from the row below (if it is black). If a black stitch is needed in a white-yarn row and the stitch of the previous row was white (i.e., slipped), the pattern is impossible for mosaic knitting. Therefore, any black or white vertical stripe must begin and end with the corresponding yarn, which implies that the number of knitted rows in any vertical stripe must be 2 times an odd number, i.e., 2x1=2, 2x3=6, 2x5=10, etc. However, this constraint on possible patterns can be well-hidden if the pattern is large enough.

Mosaic knitting can produce many beautiful patterns, particularly geometrical or Grecian designs. Historically, mosaic patterns are rather rectilinear, being composed mainly of thin horizontal and vertical stripes that meet at right angles. However, mosaic knitting has limitations relative to other techniques for producing color patterns in knitting such as Fair-isle knitting. Depending on the pattern, a mosaic-knit fabric may be stiff and tense, due to the many slipped stitches; such fabrics may be better for coats and jackets, which do not require as much drape. The tension in the fabric may also distort the rectilinear lines into curves. These problems may be overcome by judiciously elongating the stitches. Some color patterns may be impossible for mosaic knitting, if they require too many slipped stitches or if the colors do not line up conveniently (as described above). Blocks of solid colors can be done in mosaic knitting, but require many slipped stitches in a row; hence, blocks of solid colors are usually broken up with stippling, i.e., with regularly spaces spots of the opposing color. On the other hand, mosaic knitting is significantly lighter than Fair-isle knitting, which is nearly twice as thick and bulky. Long horizontal bars of the same color are also more convenient in mosaic knitting than they are in Fair-isle knitting (where such bars require that the other colors be held at the back for long runs).

A simple extension of mosaic knitting is to use multiple colors, rather than just two, although the limitations on the pattern become even more severe. Another variant is to hold the yarns on opposite edges (or to knit circularly), which allows the knitter to knit only one row per color.
