= Grafting (knitting) =

Joining of two knitted fabrics

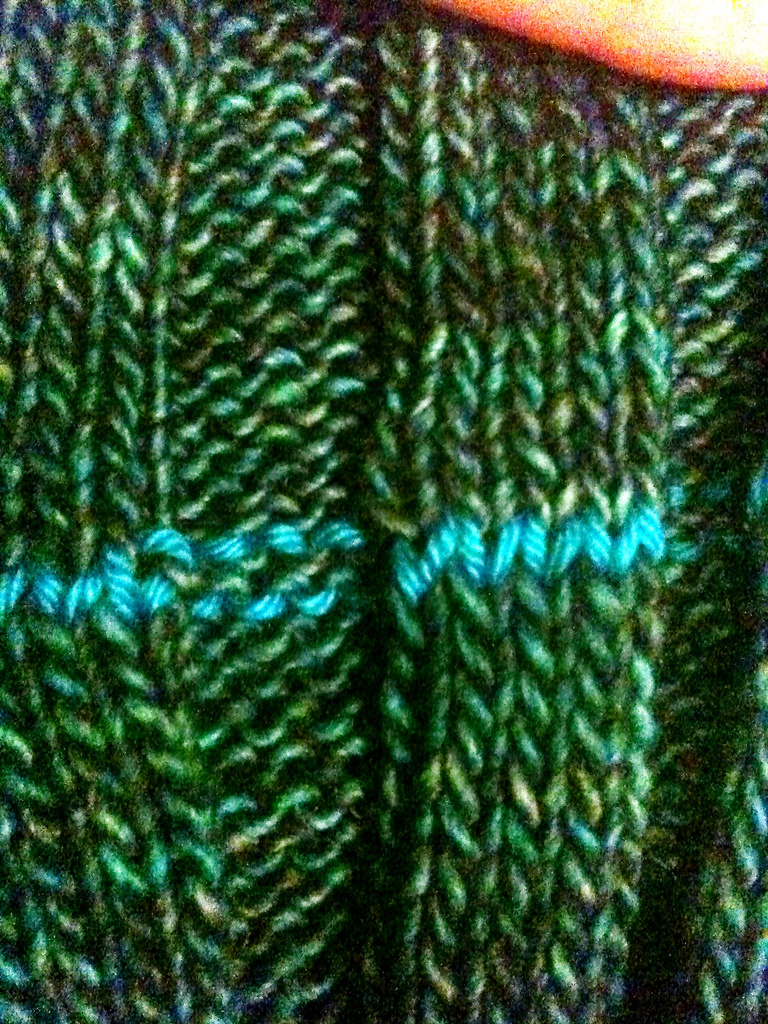
A close-up view of knitted grafting stitches

In knitting, grafting is a method of joining knitted fabric using yarn and a needle in one of three types of seams. This can be used to join two sets of live stitches, or one set of live stitches to an edge or hem.

The Kitchener stitch is a common method of grafting and creates a "seamless" join that looks like the rest of the knit fabric. . The yarn follows the route of a row of ordinary knitting, with the knitter pulling the yarn on the needle through the stitches as they sew as if to knit or purl. This is often done when closing off a knitted sock at the toe. The technique is named after Horatio Herbert Kitchener, though the technique was practiced long before.

== See also ==
- Three needle bindoff
