= Anna Zilboorg =

American knitter and author

Anna Zilboorg (born 1933) is a master knitter and author known for her books about traditional knitting designs and patterns.

== Early life and education ==
Zilboorg was born and raised in New York City. She learned to knit when she was young. She received a doctorate in comparative literature from Harvard University. She taught Slavic literature at MIT. She lived in the Blue Ridge Mountains of Virginia before retiring to Rockland, Maine.

== Career ==
Zilboorg began her work with textiles as a quilt maker and moved on to knitting because she lacked space to lay out quilts. She considers herself a "hedonist with knitting," finding ways to make knitting enjoyable.

Her patterns have been reproduced in books and magazines and she has given workshops across the United States about knitting techniques and philosophy.

== Bibliography ==
- Knitting for Anarchists: The What, Why and How of Knitting ISBN 9780486794662
- 45 Fine & Fanciful Hats to Knit ISBN 9781579900090
- Magnificent Mittens & Socks: The Beauty of Warm Hands and Feet ISBN 9781933064161
- Fancy Feet: Traditional Knitting Patterns of Turkey ISBN 9780937274750
- Splendid Apparel: A Handbook of Embroidered Knitting ISBN 9781933064307
- Simply Socks: 45 Traditional Turkish Patterns to Knit ISBN 9781887374590
- Socks for Sandals and Clogs (with Merike Saarnit) ISBN 9780976106418
