= Meg Swansen =

American knitting designer

Meg Swansen is a knitting designer, owner of Schoolhouse Press and the daughter of Elizabeth Zimmermann. Similar to her mother, she has helped to popularize knitting and is a well-respected author and knitting teacher, especially at her knitting retreats. Swansen also writes a long-running regular column in Vogue Knitting called "Meg Swansen on...", which covers everything from the Turkish cast on (Fall 2005), to lace knitting (Spring/Summer 2006), to the recherché Scandinavian two-end knitting (Winter 2006/2007).

Swansen runs a knitting camp in Marshfield, Wisconsin. This camp was established in 1974 by Elizabeth Zimmermann, and Meg took over the organization of the event when her mother retired.

== Bibliography ==
- Meg Swansen; director Cully Swansen (2007). Knitting Lace with Meg Swansen (dvd). Schoolhouse Press. ASIN B000U7VRHS.
- Swansen, M (2005). A Gathering of Lace (2nd ed.). Schoolhouse Press. ISBN 978-1-893762-24-4.
- Swansen, M (1999). Meg Swansen's Knitting: 30 Designs for Hand Knitting. Loveland, CO: Interweave Press. ISBN 978-1-883010-58-4.
- Swansen, M (1995). Handknitting with Meg Swansen. Schoolhouse Press. ISBN 978-0-942018-08-0.
