= Schoolhouse Press =

Schoolhouse Press is a supplier of hand-knitting patterns, books, wool, and tools, as well as a craft book publisher. The company was founded in 1959 by Elizabeth Zimmermann, and it is currently run by Elizabeth's daughter Meg Swansen and Elizabeth's grandson Cully Swansen. Schoolhouse Press is located in Pittsville, Wisconsin and runs the annual Knitting Camp event (the first) in Marshfield Wisconsin. Schoolhouse Press is the subject of several shows, and professionally curated shows .
