= Stephen West (designer) =

American fashion designer

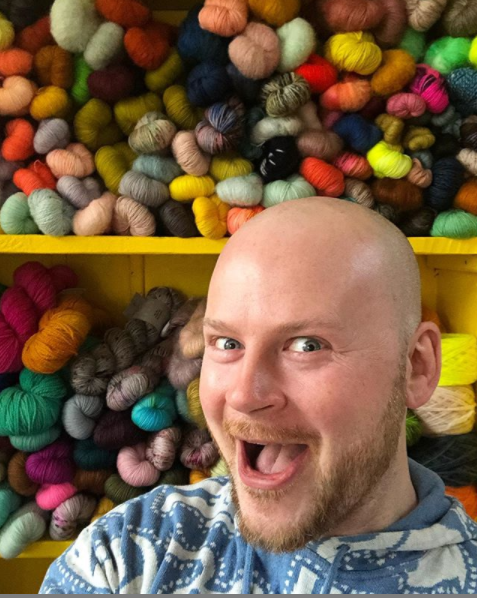
- Born: Tulsa, Oklahoma, U.S.
- Education: University of Illinois, Academy of Theatre and Dance
- Website: Westknits.com

Stephen West is an American knitter, knitting pattern designer, and knitting teacher.

West was born in Tulsa, Oklahoma, and moved to Chicago as a teenager to study dance at the University of Illinois Department of Dance. While in school he learned to knit and began to create patterns. He moved to Amsterdam to pursue a degree in choreography from the School for New Dance Development at the Academy of Theatre and Dance and continued knitting and creating patterns.

West co-owns a yarn store in Amsterdam, Netherlands. He has collaborated with yarn dyer Adella Colvin.
