= English knitting =

Style of knitting

English knitting, also known as right-hand knitting or throwing, is a style of Western knitting where the yarn to be knit into the fabric is carried in the right hand. This style is prevalent throughout the English-speaking world, though it is by no means universal.

Other Western knitting styles include continental knitting (also known as "left-hand knitting") and combined knitting. Despite the names, choice of knitting style has nothing to do with the handedness of the knitter. Various non-Western styles also exist, many of which are substantially similar to these, but which twist each stitch, making for a subtly different-looking fabric.

== Technique ==
Here, it is assumed that there are already stitches on the needles, having been cast on previously. The yarn is wrapped around the right hand for tension (in one method, the tail of the yarn is wrapped around the little finger of the right hand for tension, and over the index finger for control—see illustration). The right hand will hold the needle with the most recently knit stitches. (If at the beginning of a row, the right hand will hold the empty needle.) The left hand holds the other needle.

=== The knit stitch ===
If the yarn is sitting in front of the right needle (closer to the knitter), it should first be moved between the needles to the back. One knit stitch into the first loop on the left needle is to be made. The right needle is inserted into the left side of that loop. To see what is happening, the two needles to hold that loop can be used to hold it wide open: it is through this loop that the new stitch will be pulled. The yarn is wrapped counter-clockwise (as viewed from above; see photo) around the right needle, and this new loop is pulled with the right needle through the old one. The stitch is now complete. To prepare for the next stitch, we now withdraw the left needle from the just-completed stitch.

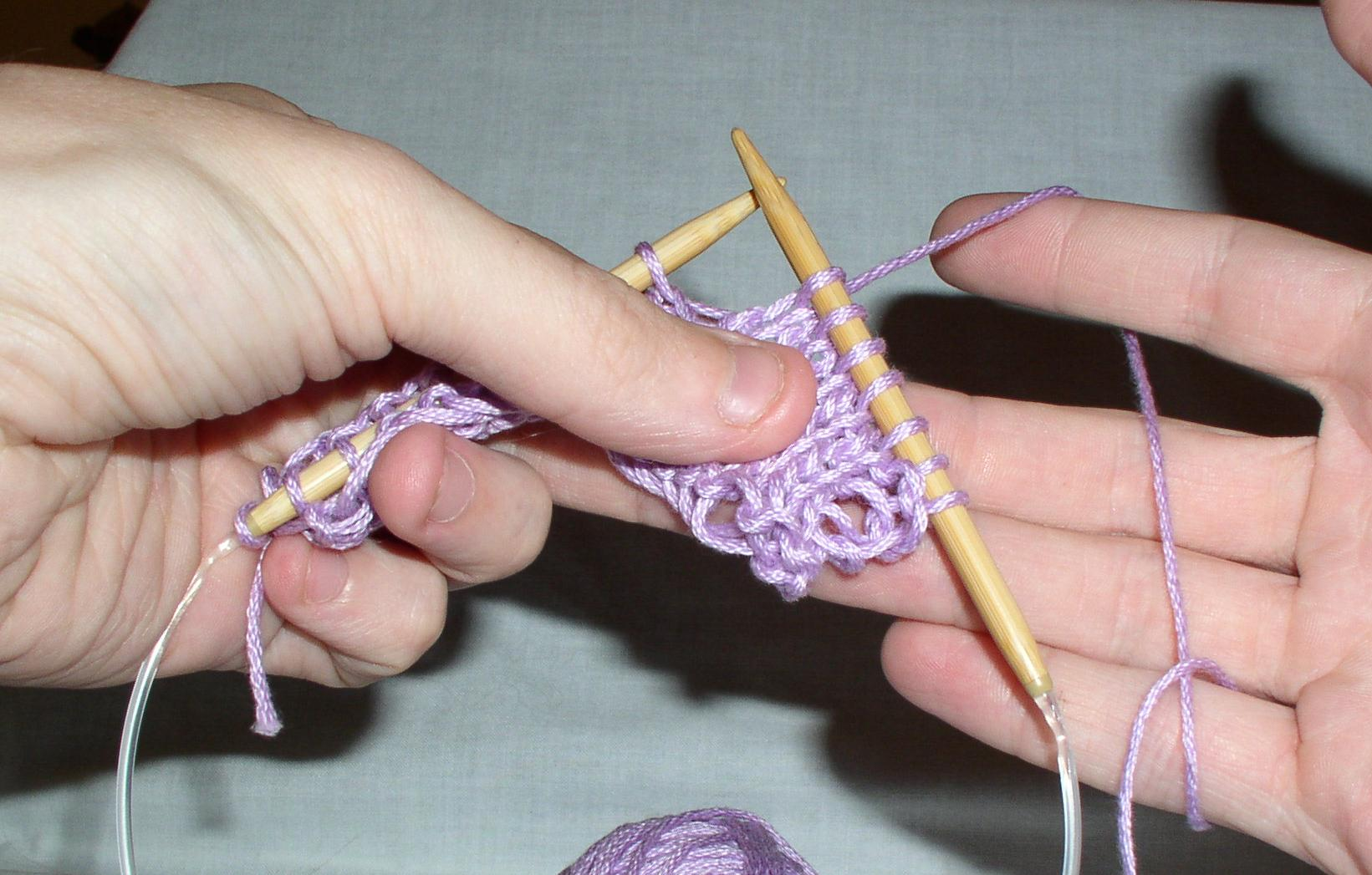
Holding the yarn

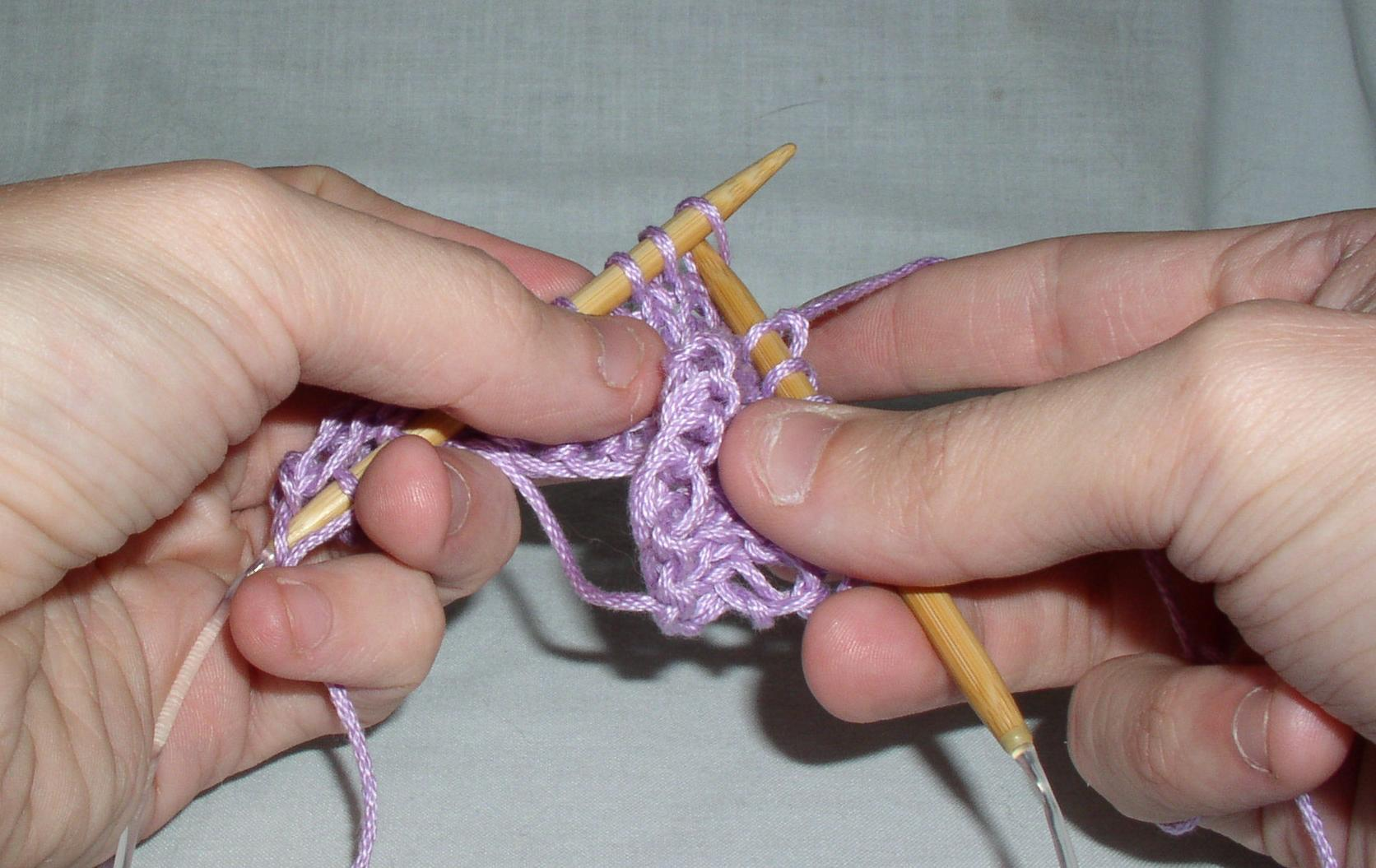
Placing the needle

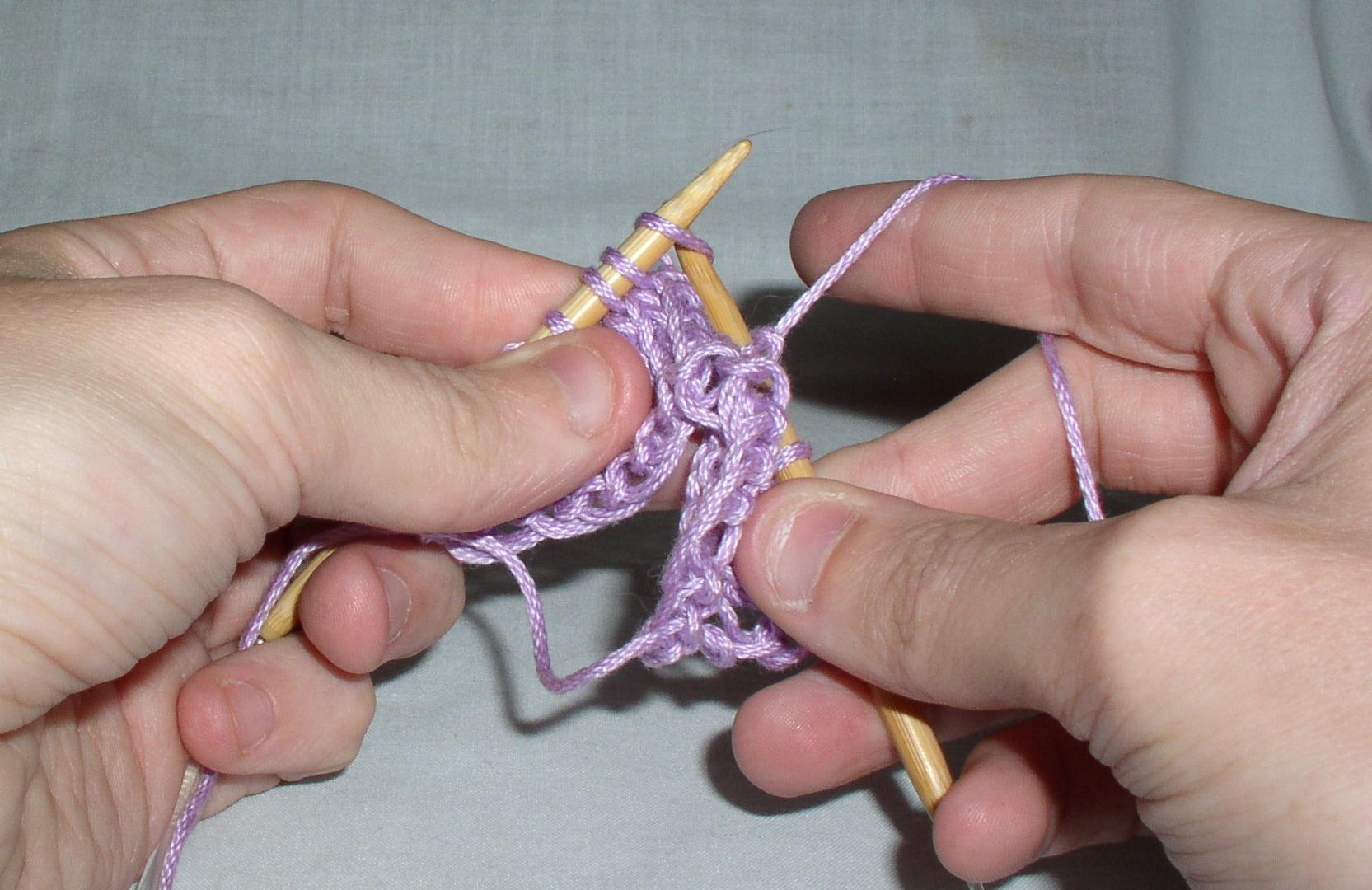
Inserting the needle

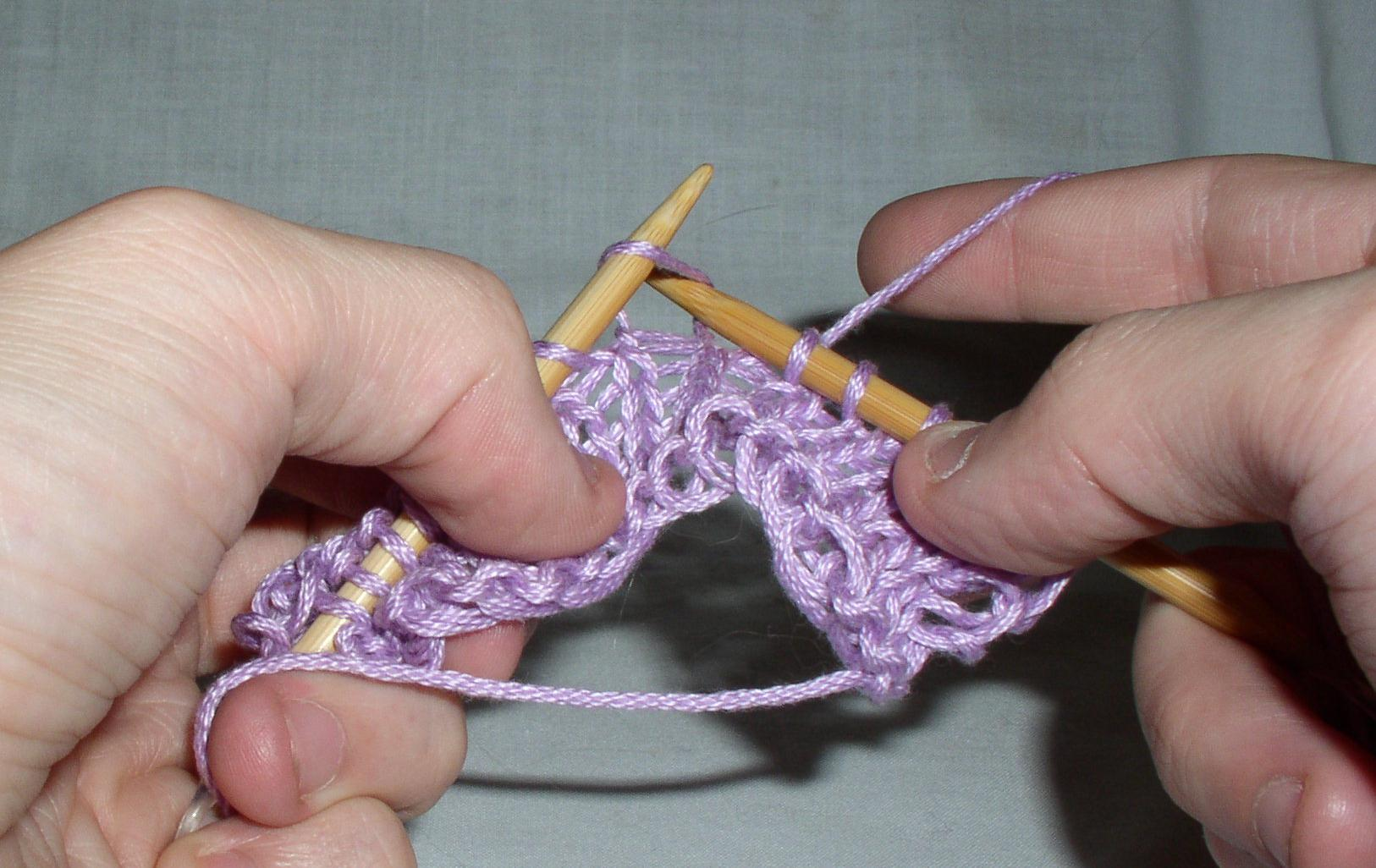
Opening the loop (exaggerated)

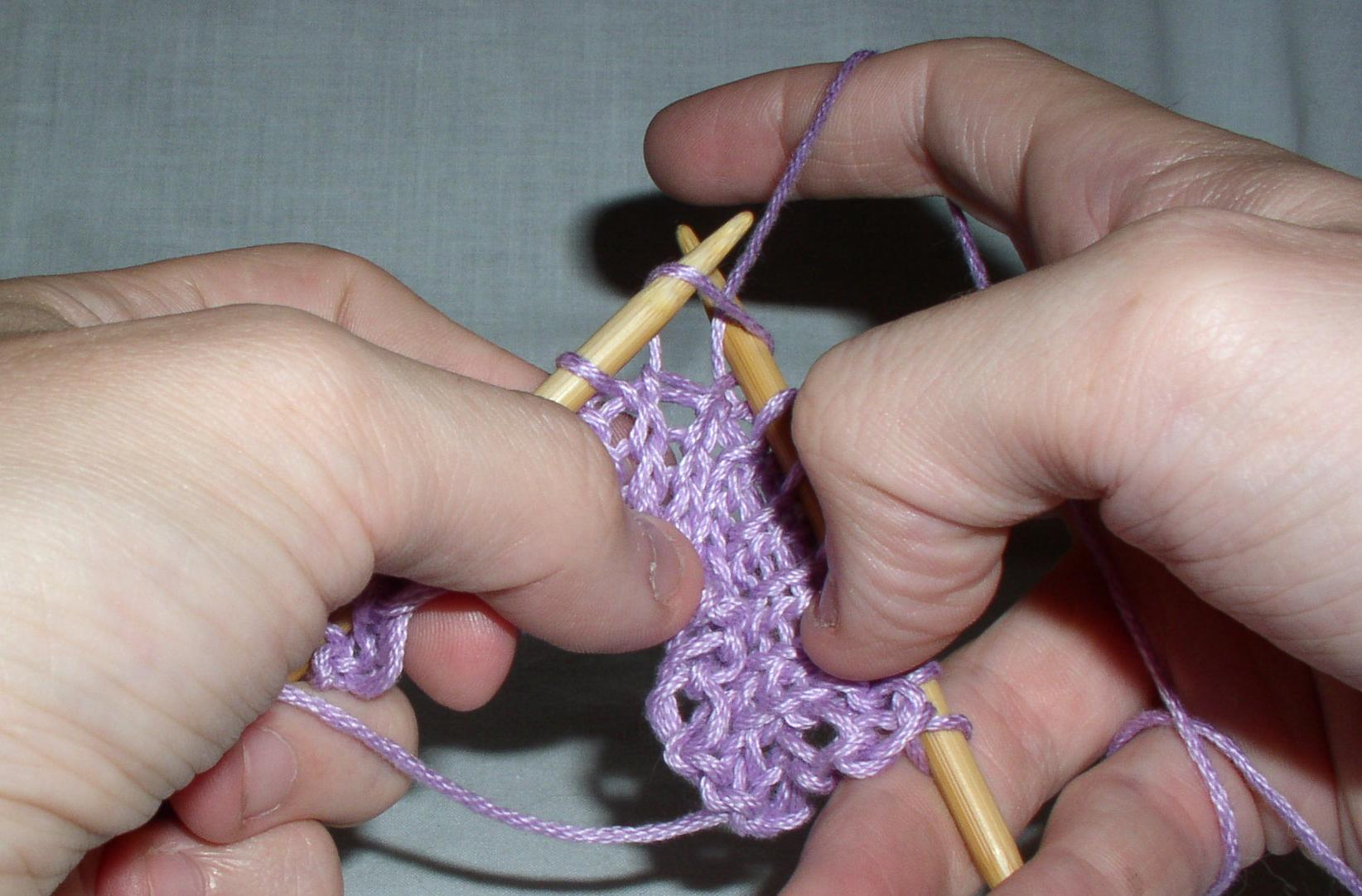
Wrapping the yarn

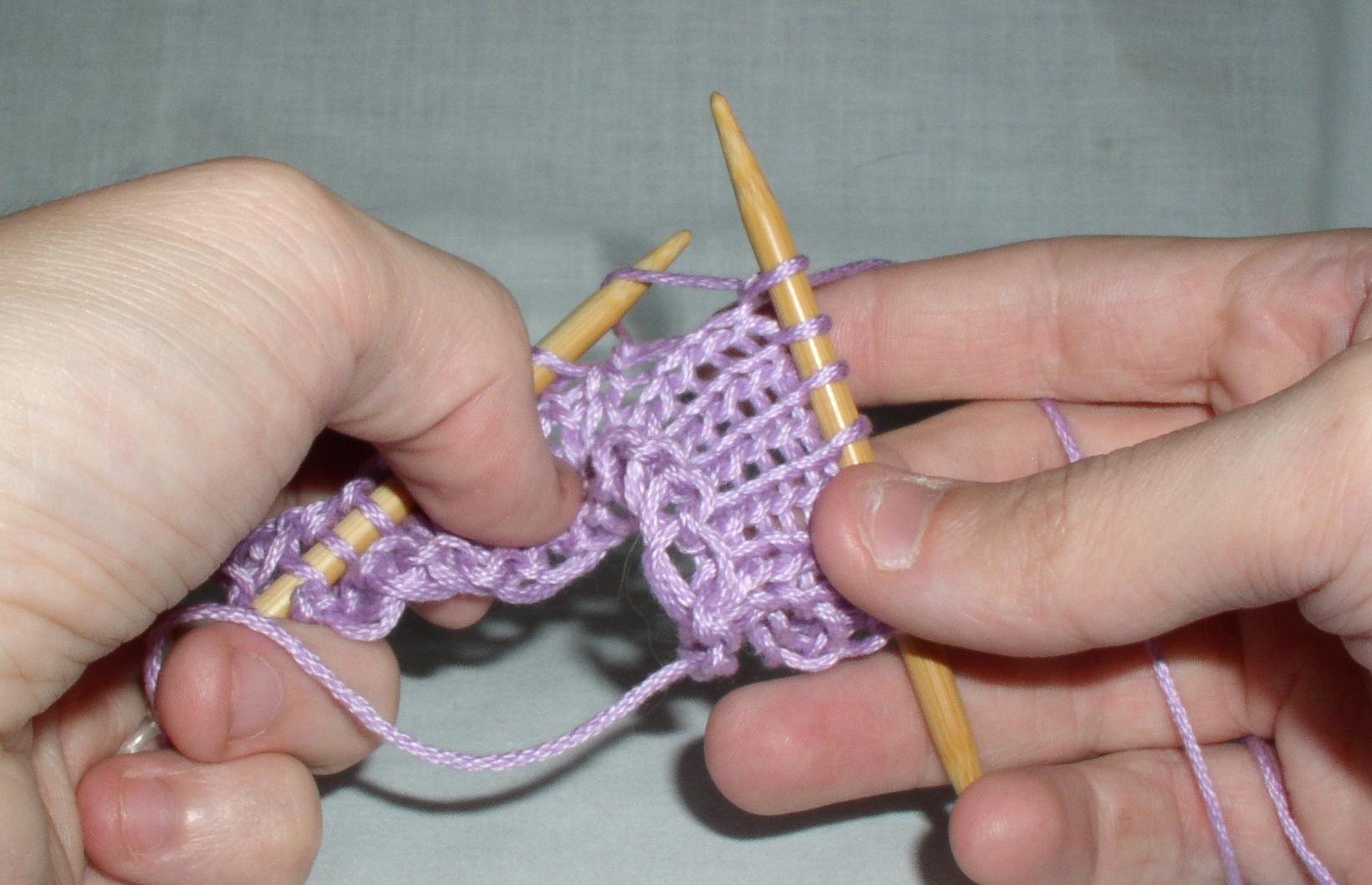
Pulling the loop through

=== The purl stitch ===
If the yarn is sitting behind the right needle (away from the knitter), it should first be moved between the needles to the front. We will make one purl stitch---which looks like the back of a knit stitch---into the first loop on the left needle. The right needle is inserted into the right side of that loop. Again, to see what is happening, we can use the needles to hold the loop open. Instead of pulling the new loop forward, the right needle is now situated to pull the new loop backward through the old loop. The yarn is still wrapped counter-clockwise around the right needle, and this new loop is then pulled through the old one. The completed stitch is then slid off the left needle.

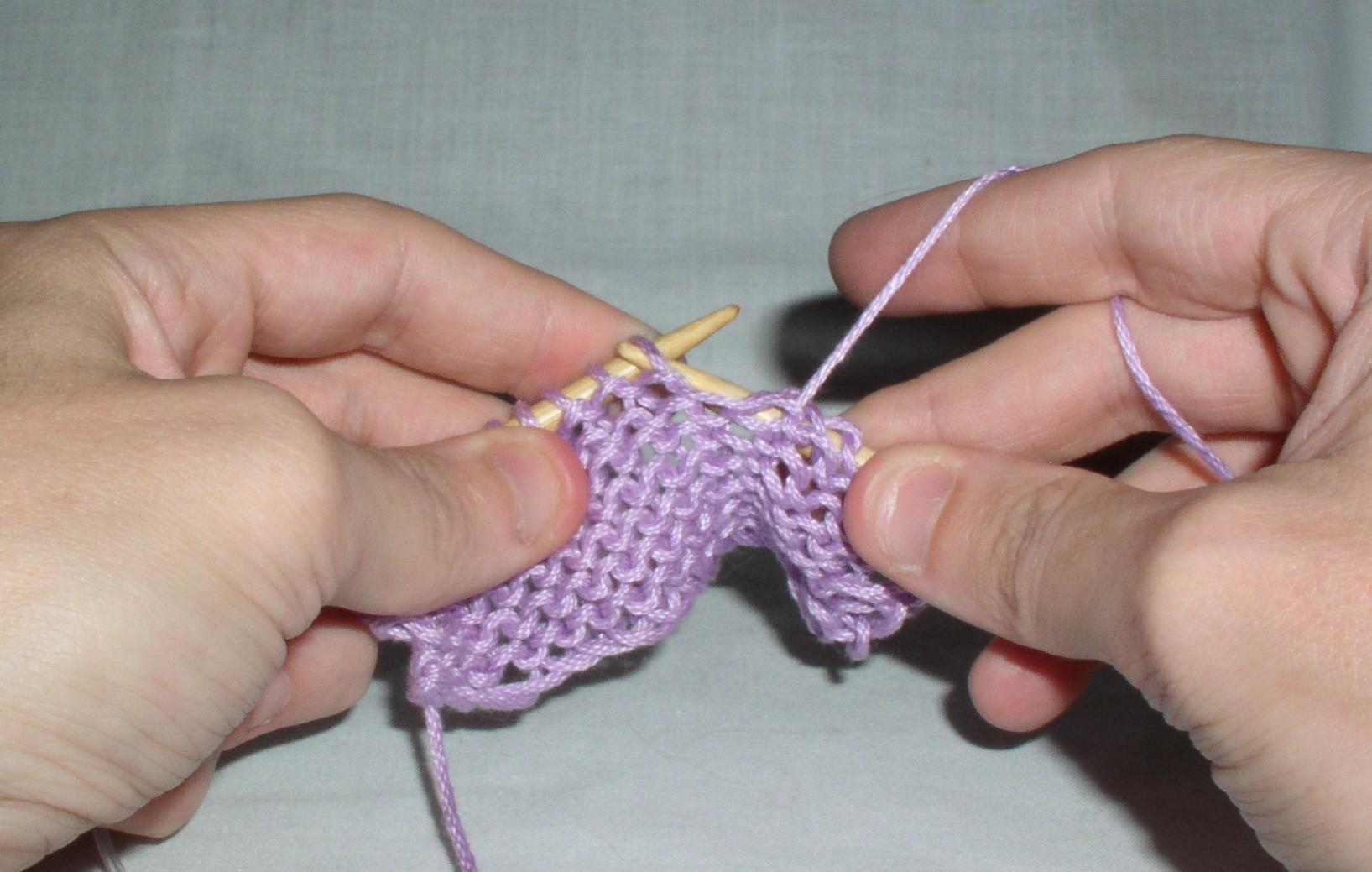
Inserting the needle

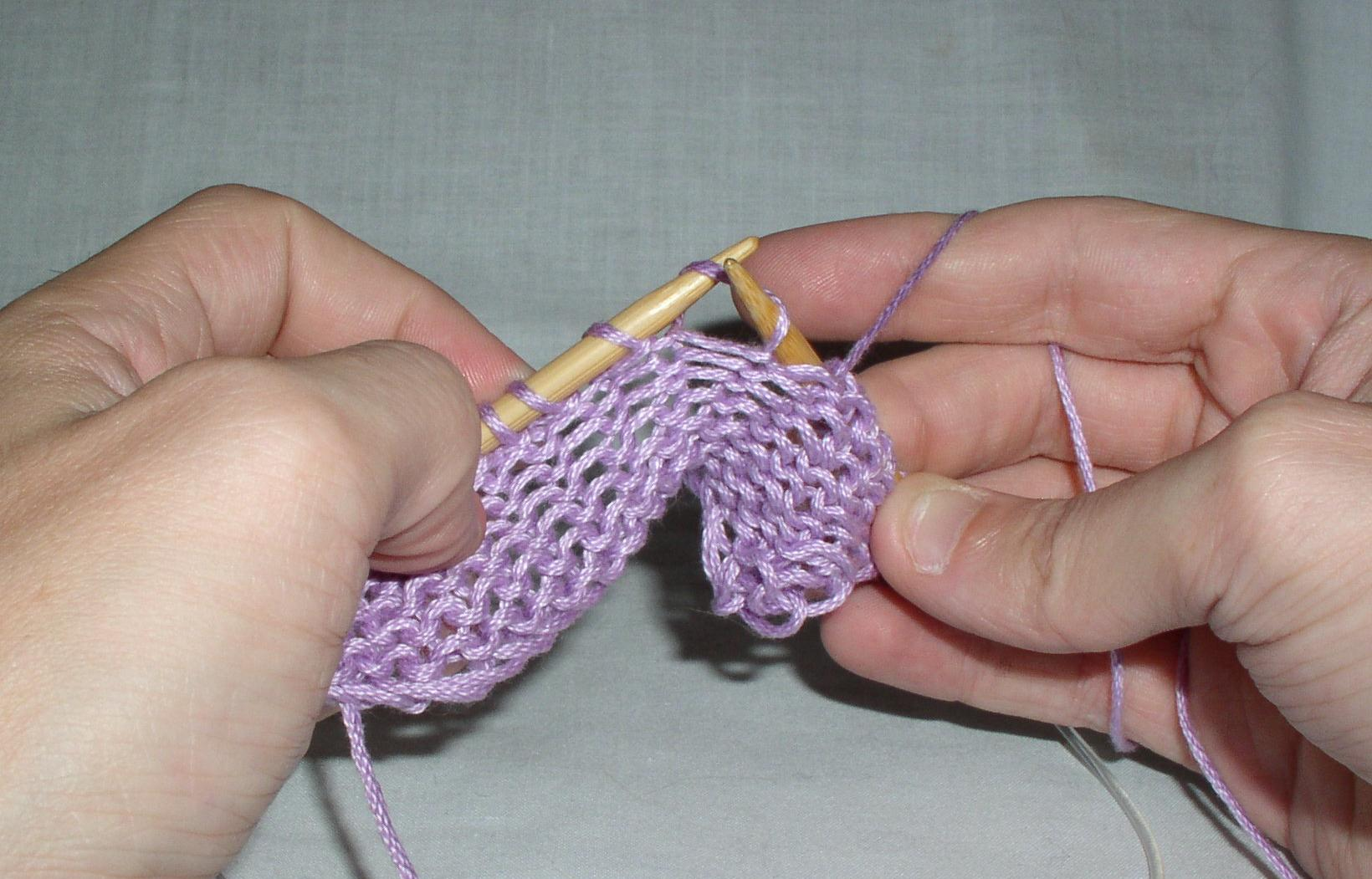
Opening the loop (exaggerated)

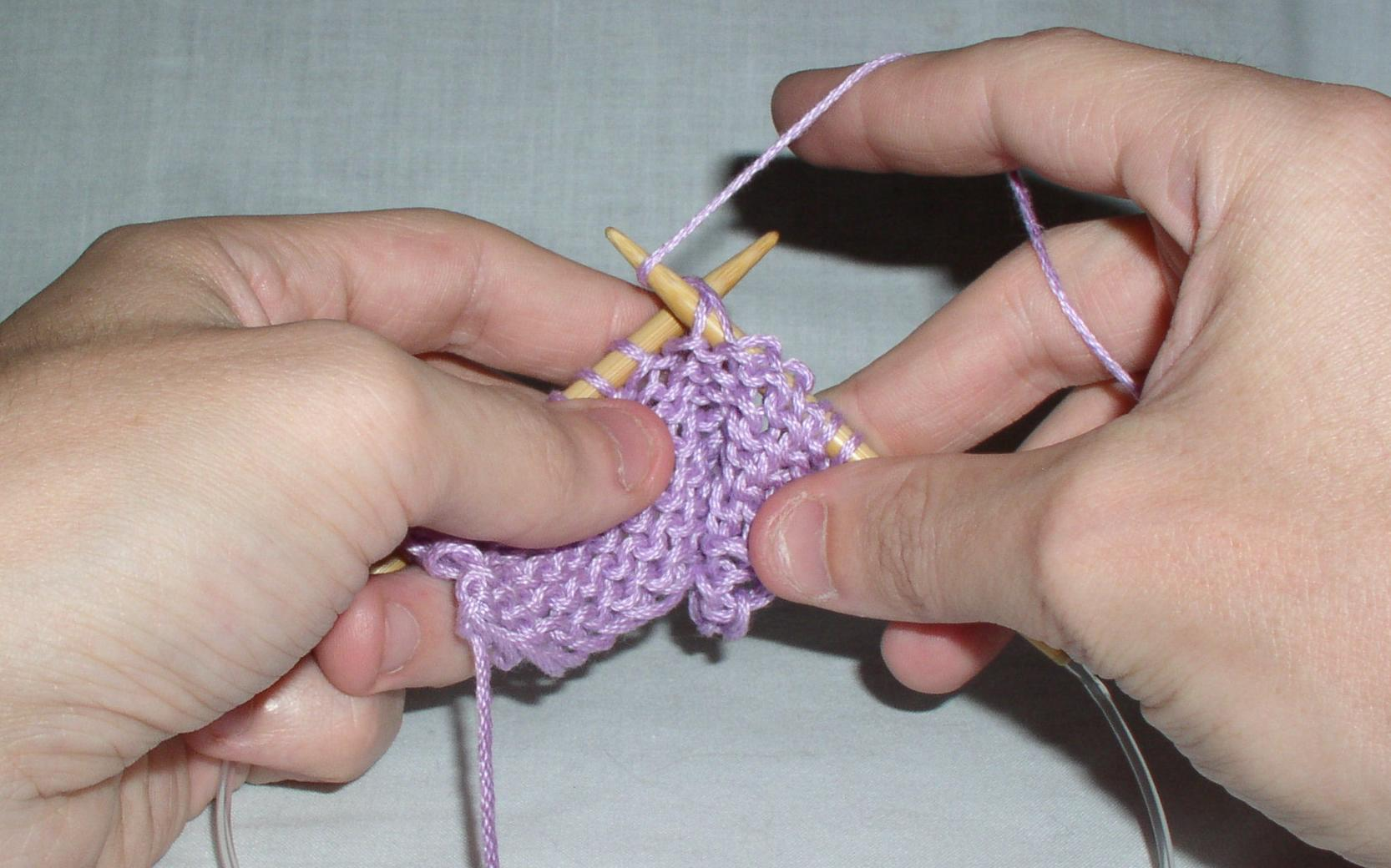
Wrapping the yarn

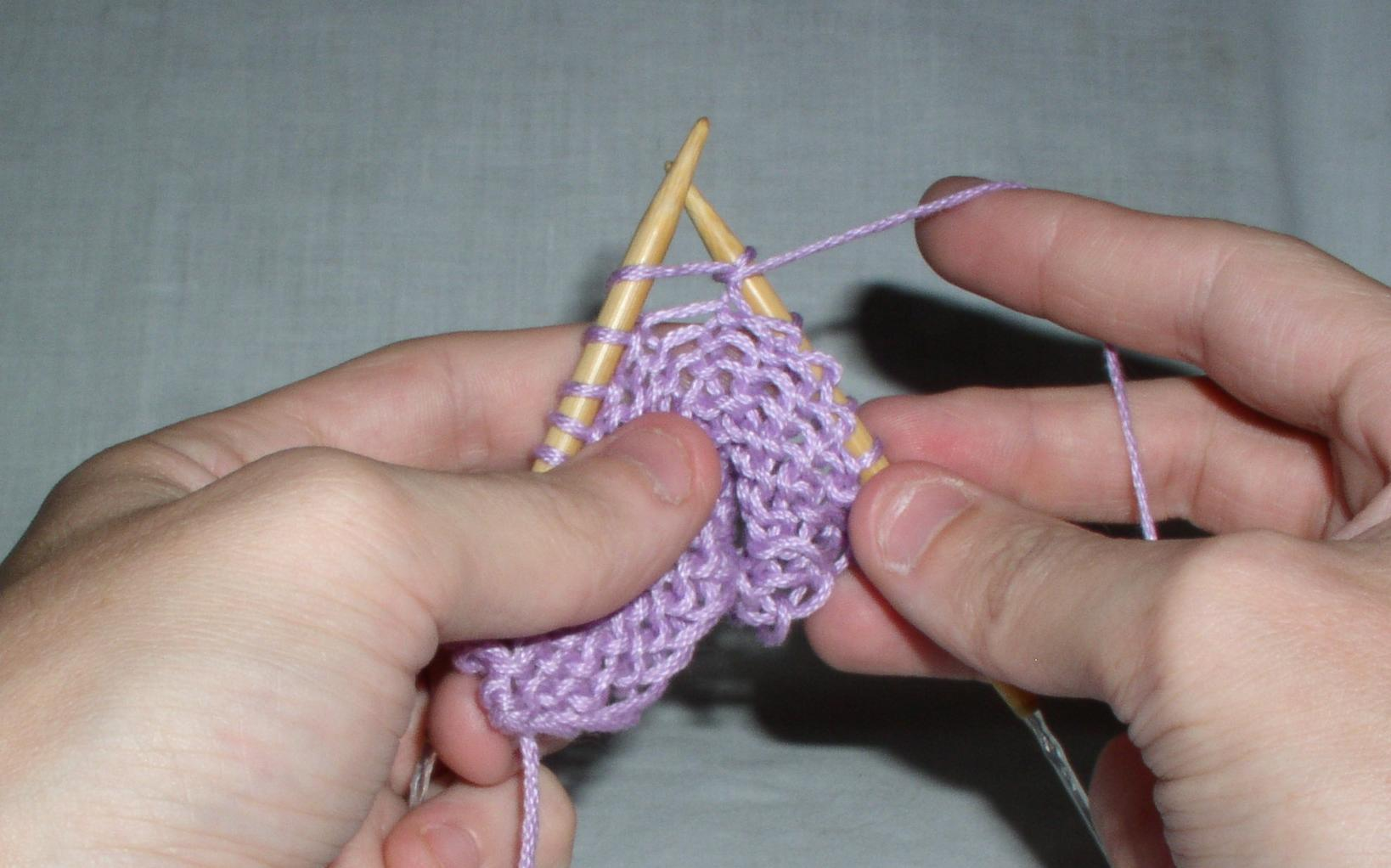
Drawing the yarn through

== See also ==
- Knitting
- Combined knitting
- Continental knitting
