= Kian =

Kian may refer to:

== Places ==
- Kian, Chaharmahal and Bakhtiari, Iran
- Kian, Isfahan, Iran
- Kian, Khuzestan, Iran
- Kian, Babol, Iran
- Ji'an, China, formerly romanized as Kian

== People ==
- Kian (given name)
- Kian (musician), an Australian singer-songwriter
- Kian (tea master), a tea master of Ryukyu Kingdom
- Kian84, a South Korean manhwaga

== Other uses ==
- Kian F.C., a football club based in Teheran, Iran, later renamed
- Kian (bull), red Holstein breeding bull

== See also ==
- Cian, a figure in Irish mythology
- Cian (name) Irish given name
- Kiana
- Kyan (name)
- Kiyan (disambiguation)
- Kayanian dynasty
- Kian Baraftab, a village in Lorestan Province, Iran
- Kian-e Nesar, a village in Lorestan Province
- Sarab-e Kian, a village in Lorestan Province
- Giyan, a city in Hamadan Province, Iran
