= Kiana =

Kiana and Qiana may refer to:

== Places ==
- Kiana, Alaska
- Kiana, South Australia

== People ==
- Kiana (given name)
- Kiana (singer) (born 2007), Australian-Swedish singer
- Kiana of Nishapur, Kiana Sādāt-Hosseini (2009–2016), Iranian murder victim

== Other ==
- Kiana (band), a Finnish melodic death metal band

== See also ==
- Kianna, a given name
- Qiana, a silky nylon fabric developed by DuPont and heavily marketed in the 1970s
- Qiana Joseph (born 2001), West Indian cricketer
