= Kiana (given name) =

- Gender: Feminine
- Language: English, Hawaiian, Irish, Persian

Origin
- Meaning: Various

Kiana or Kianna is a feminine given name with origins in multiple languages and cultures. It is sometimes regarded as a modern English name formed from the elements ki and ana or anna. It is also a Hawaiian form of the name Diana or a variant spelling of Qiana, which was the name of a type of fabric that was in use as a given name. Quiana and Quianna are variants. It is also considered a feminine form of Kian, an English form of the Irish name Cian. As a Persian name, the name is said to mean elements of nature.

== Women named Kiana ==
- Kiana Blanckert (born 2007), Australian-Swedish singer
- Kiana of Nishapur, Kiana Sādāt-Hosseini (2009–2016), Iranian murder victim
- Kiana Aran, American biomedical entrepreneur
- Kiana Davenport, American author
- Kiana Eide (born 1998), American group rhythmic gymnast
- Kiana Elliott (born 1997), Australian weightlifter
- Kiana Firouz, Iranian writer
- Kiana Hayeri (born 1988), Iranian-Canadian photojournalist
- Kiana James (born 1997), American professional wrestler
- Kiana Johnson (born 1993), American basketball player
- Kiana Kryeziu (born 2004), Kosovan alpine skier
- Kiana Ledé (born 1997), American singer
- Kiana Madeira (born 1992), Canadian actress
- Kiana Palacios (born 1996), Mexican footballer
- Kiana Swift (born 2000), Canadian-Tongan footballer
- Kiana Takairangi (born 1992), New Zealand rugby league footballer
- Kiana Tom (born 1965), American exercise instructor and actress
- Kiana Valenciano (born 1992), Filipino singer
- Kiana Weber (born 1990), American violinist
- Kiana Williams (born 1999), American basketball player

== Fictional Characters named Kiana ==
- Kiana Kaslana, one of the main protagonists of the Honkai series by miHoYo.
