= Keon =

- Pronunciation: Persian: [kiˈjɒːn]
- Gender: Male

Origin
- Meaning: 'ancient'; 'king, realm'

Other names
- Variant forms: Kian, Keion

Keon is a masculine given name. Depending on its spelling it could be of Persian (کیان) or Gaelic Irish (Cian) origin.

Notable people with the name include:

- Keon Alexander (born circa 1980s or 1990s), Canadian actor, sometimes credited as Keon Mohajeri
- Keon Broxton (born 1990), American baseball player
- Keon Clark (born 1975), American basketball player
- Keon Coleman (born 2003), American football player
- Keon Daniel (born 1987), Trinidadian footballer
- Keon Ellis (born 2000), American basketball player
- Keon Harding (born 1996), Barbadian cricketer
- Keon Johnson (basketball, born 1995) (born 1995), American basketball player
- Keon Joseph (born 1991), Guyanese cricketer
- Keon Keeley (born 2005), American football player
- Keon Lyn (born 1992), American football player
- Keon Peters (born 1982), St Vincent cricketer
- Keon Raymond (born 1982), American football player
- Keon Sabb (born 2002), American football player
- Keon Zipperer (born 2001), American football player

== Surname ==
- Dave Keon (born 1940), Canadian ice hockey player
- Johnny Keon (1885–1921), Australian rules footballer
- Michael Keon (1918–2006), Australian political journalist and author
- Michael Marcos Keon (born 1954), Filipino politician
- Miles Gerald Keon (1821–1875), Irish Roman Catholic journalist and novelist
- Stan Keon (1915–1987), Australian politician
- Wilbert Keon (1935-2019), Canadian surgeon

== See also ==
- Keion (disambiguation) , given name
- McKeon, Irish surname
- Keanu (disambiguation)
- Keone (disambiguation)
