= Kion =

KION or Kion, may refer to:

== Groups, companies, organizations ==
- KION-TV, a television station (channel 46 analog/32 digital) licensed to Monterey, California, United States
- KION (AM), a radio station (1460 AM) licensed to Salinas, California, United States
- KION Group, a manufacturer of materials handling equipment
- Kion de Mexico, aircraft ground services company in operation from 1994 to 2009

== People and characters ==
=== Given name: Kion, Ki-On ===
- Kion, character from Disney's The Lion Guard
- Kion Benjamin (born 2000), Trinidad and Tobago athlete
- Kion Etete (born 2001), English professional footballer
- Kion Smith (born 1998), American football offensive tackle
- Kion Wilson (born 1986), American football linebacker
- Hui Ki On (1943-2008; Chinese: 許淇安, known as Eddie), the last Commissioner of the Royal Hong Kong Police of the United Kingdom, the first Commissioner of Hong Kong Police of China

=== Surnamed Kion ===
- Jessica Kion (fl. 2000s–2020s), bass guitarist in the American band Bent Knee

== Other uses ==
- Potassium ion (K-ion)
  - K ion (physiology)
  - Potassium-ion battery (K-ion battery)

== See also ==
- Keion
- KEON
- Keon
- Kyon
