= Illusion knitting =

Form of textile art

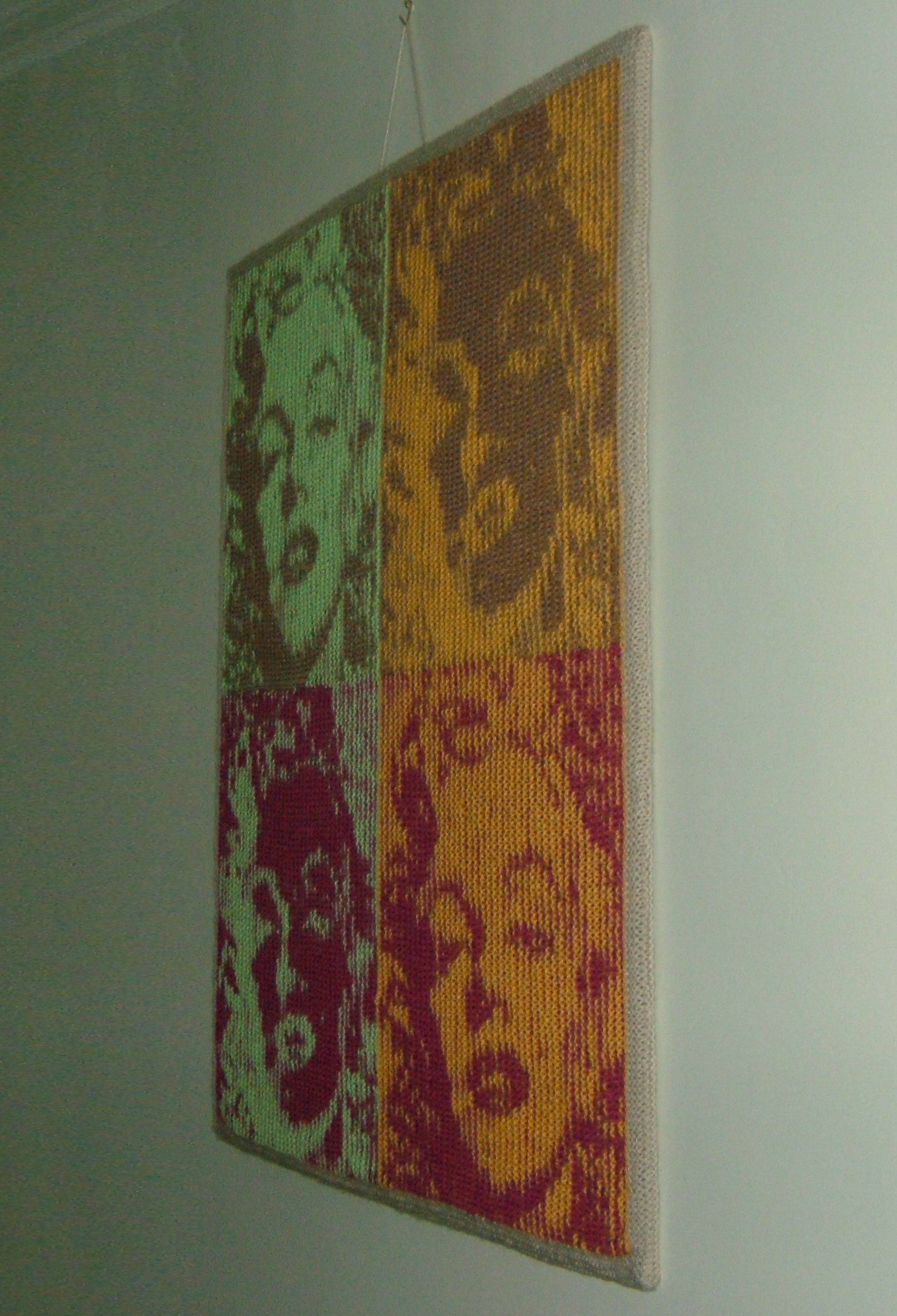
Marilyn Monroe Illusion

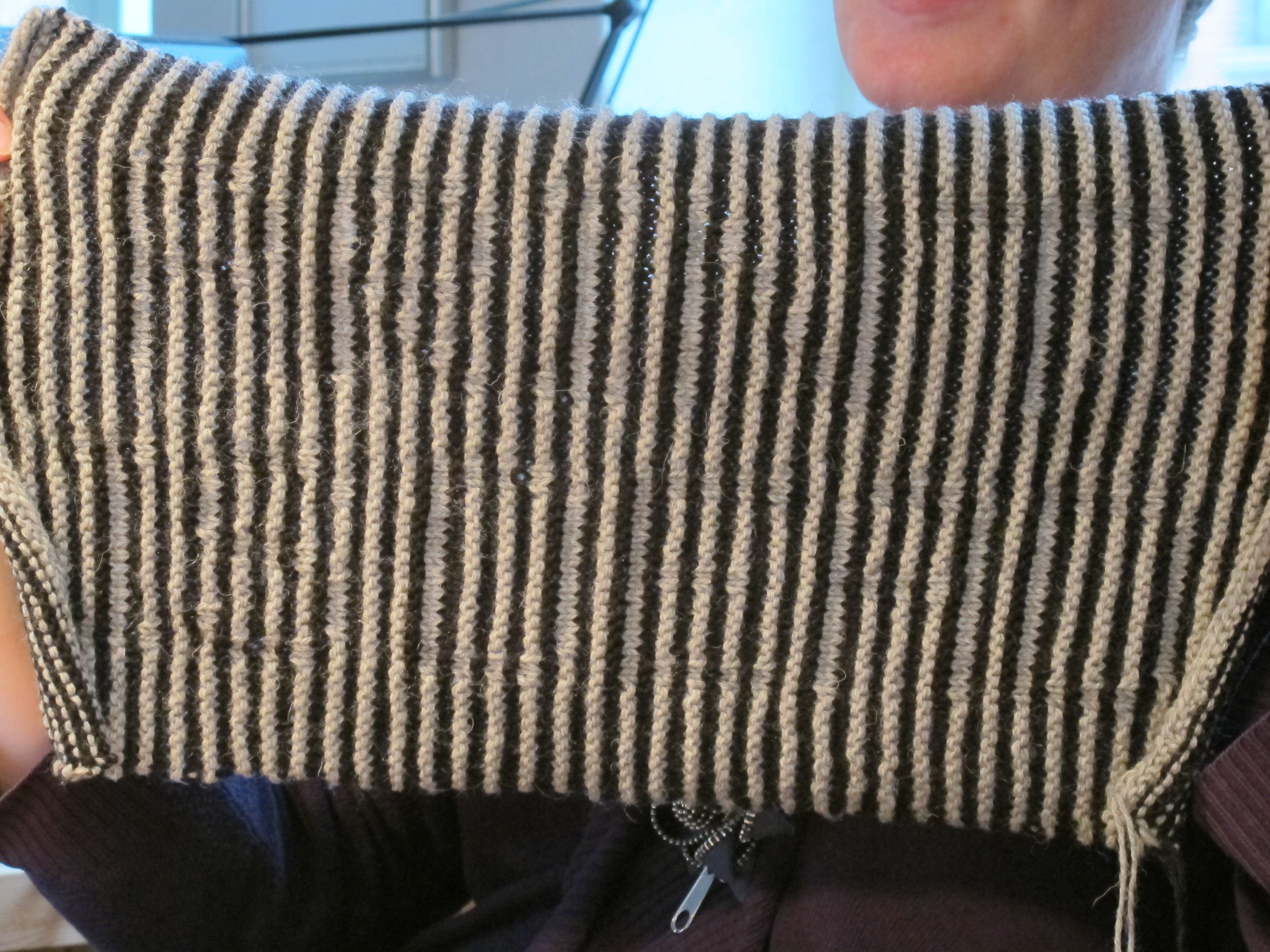
Shadow knitting viewed from the front, so that the message knit into the fabric is invisible

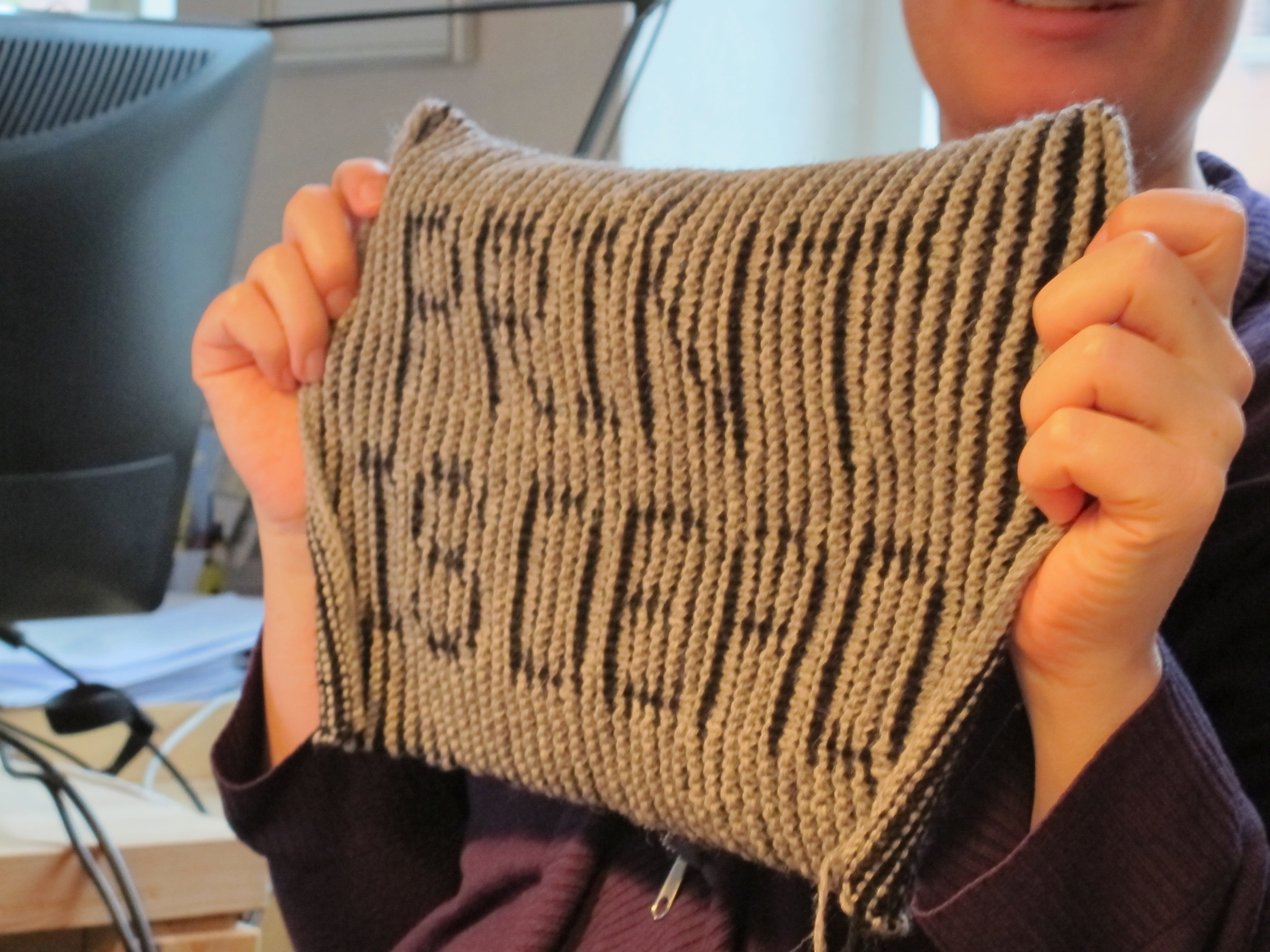
Shadow knitting viewed from the side, making the message knit into the fabric visible

Illusion knitting or shadow knitting is a form of textile art, in which the knitting is viewed as simply narrow stripes from one angle, and as an image when viewed from another angle. Illusion knitting has been recognised as an art form since 2010, largely due to the advances made by Steve Plummer who has created several large and detailed pieces. Similar effects occur in Tunisian crochet.

== Method ==
Illusion knitting uses two colours of yarn and is worked in stripes of two rows in each colour. Illusion knitting is based on the flat smooth stocking stitch and the raised garter stitch. It is this combination of textures which allows the image to be seen only from the proper angle.

Traditionally, charts for illusion knitting use four rows of knitting symbols to represent the stitches which the designer wishes to be seen. This makes the charts elongated and difficult to use for anything other than simple blocks of colour. These four rows make up two pairs where, in most cases, one pair is considered the opposite of the other. Where one pair has two rows of knit stitches, the other image pair has both knit and purl stitches.

As in mosaic knitting, the knitter alternates between two colors. Colors with good contrast are preferred but are not required. The knitter knits two rows of color A, then two rows of color B, and repeats this throughout the body of the work. Only knit or purl stitches are used.

This is a basic shadow knitting pattern created in Microsoft Excel.

Each row in the pattern, shown in the thumbnail to the right, represents four rows of knit or purl stitches, and each column represents one stitch. To follow this pattern, a knitter would use black and white: white being the background color (BC), and black being the master color (MC).

- Start at row one. This could be thought of as Row 1-1 and is a right-side row (RS).
- Row 1-1 (RS): With BC, knit.
- Row 1-2 (still following the pattern at row 1) (WS): Knit the blank boxes, purl the ones filled in.
- Row 1-3 (RS): Change to MC, knit.
- Row 1-4 (WS): Purl the blank boxes, knit the ones filled in.
- Move to Row 2 on the pattern and begin knitting the BC. (This is row 2–1.) Repeat for all rows and bind off.

The visual effect of shadow knitting is due to the different height of the knit stitches on the wrong side rows. A knit stitch is flat, while a purl stitch is raised. Therefore, one can change which color (dark or light) stands out by changing from knit to purl. So the basic idea is to create a pattern in knit stitches in the colors one wants and purl stitches in the background color. When looking straight at the knitted piece, the stitches look approximately the same, but from an angle, only the raised purl stitches are visible.

There are no constraints on the position of the purl/knit stitches, so a nearly infinite variety of patterns can be made. The pattern will not be apparent from every direction of viewing, since one ridge may "overshadow" another. Knitters often enjoy watching when the picture created becomes visible. The stark contrast of alternating light and dark stripes is also visually interesting.

Extensions of the method include using more than two colors or using other stitches; e.g., lace knitting or cable knitting.

== Viewing ==
For an illusion artwork to be effective it has to be able to be seen from a variety of angles. Generally, illusions that are designed to be viewed from the side are best. If the illusion hangs on the wall, the viewer can move around it and see the image appear and disappear. The illusion can be viewed equally well from the right and wrong sides. An illusion designed to be seen from the bottom would have to hang very high on the wall as a viewer would probably never be able to see it while facing it directly. This type of illusion is best used on a flat surface.

Five views of Einstein Illusion
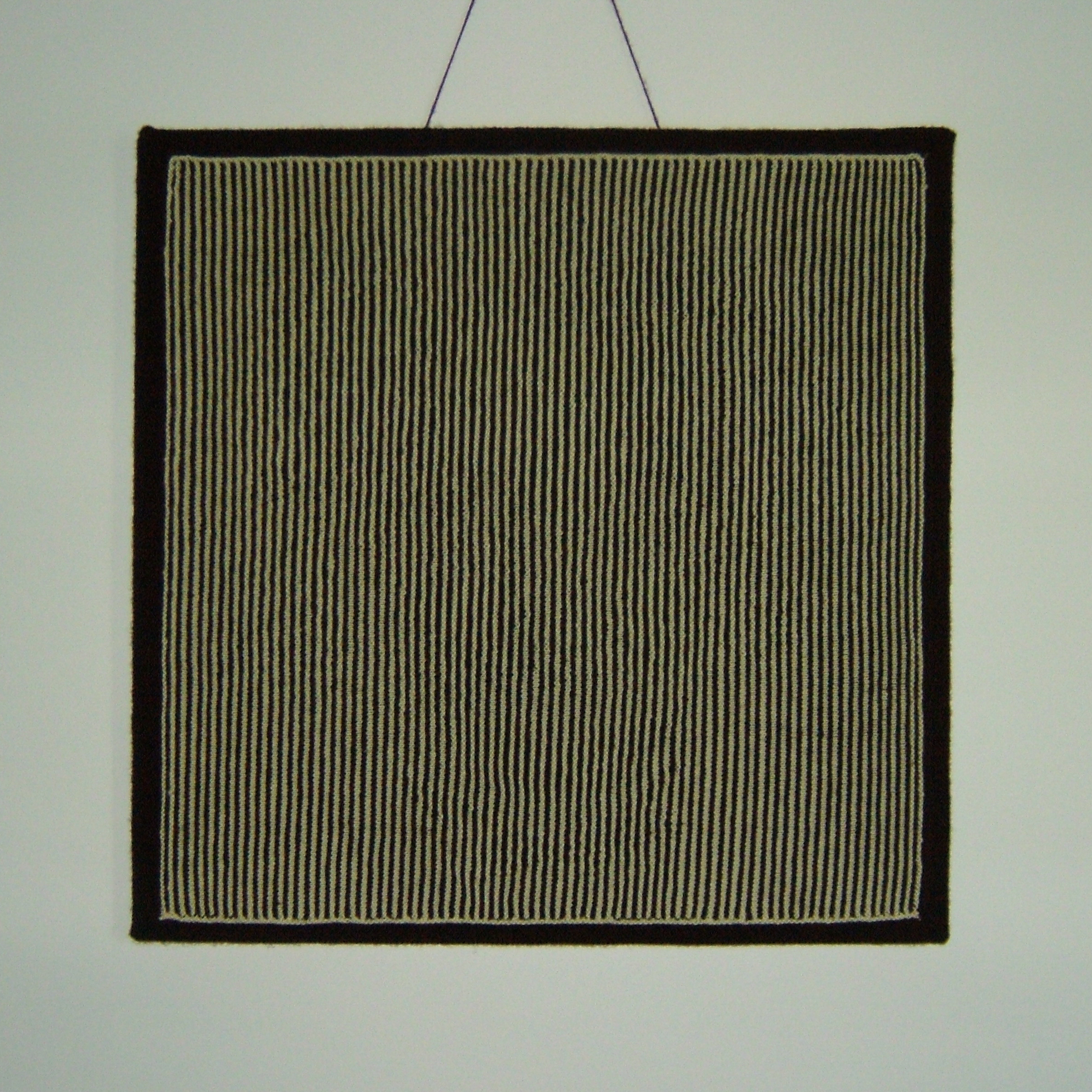

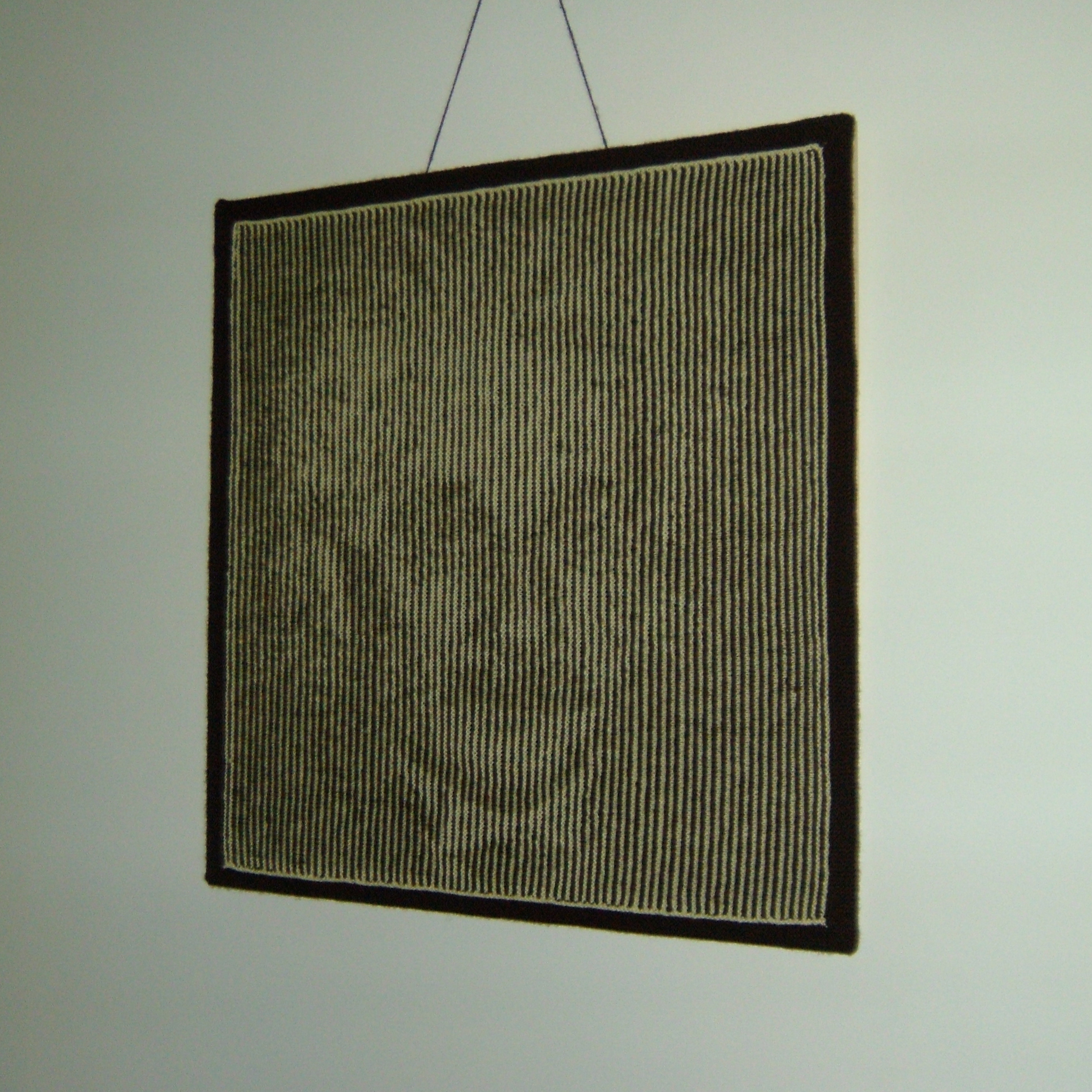

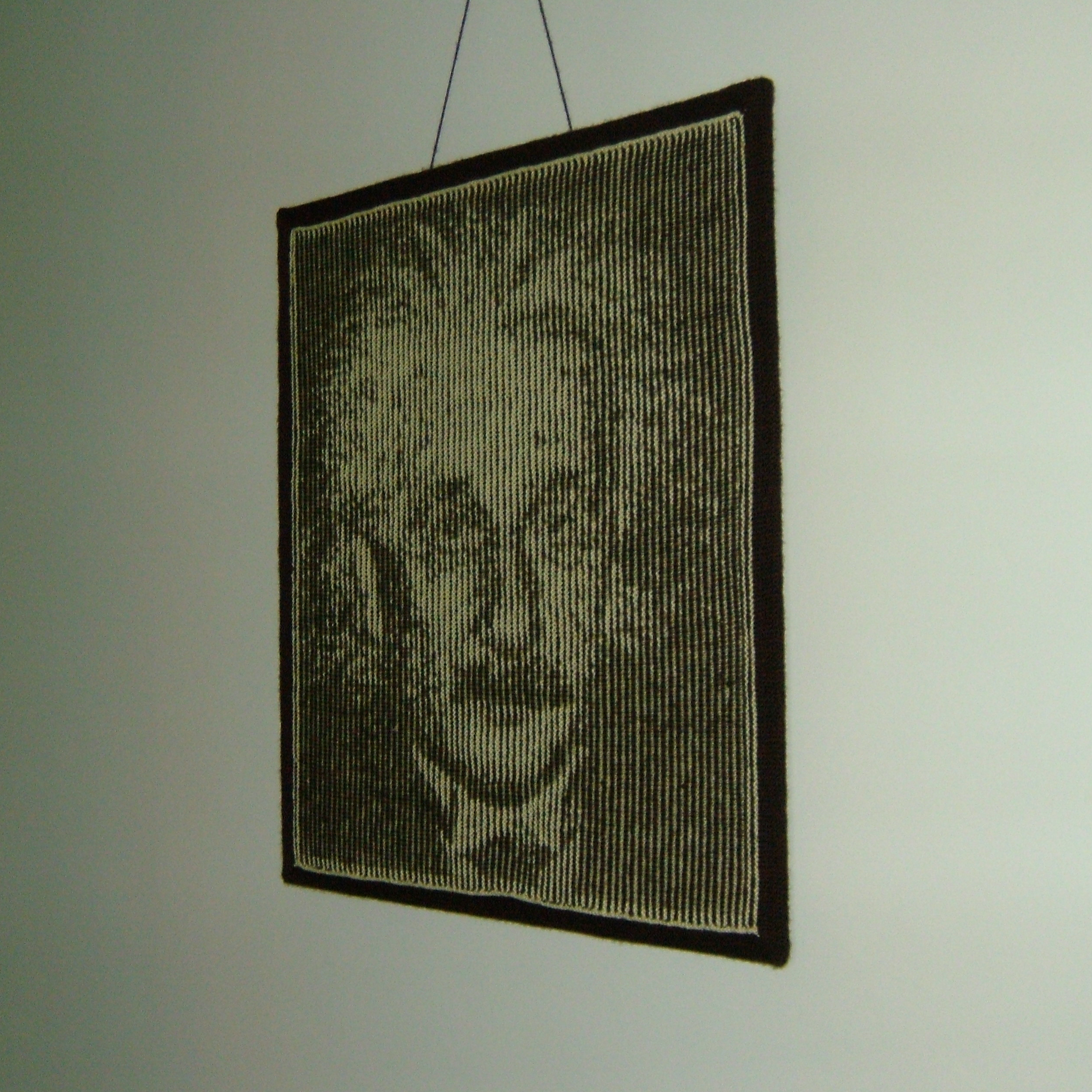

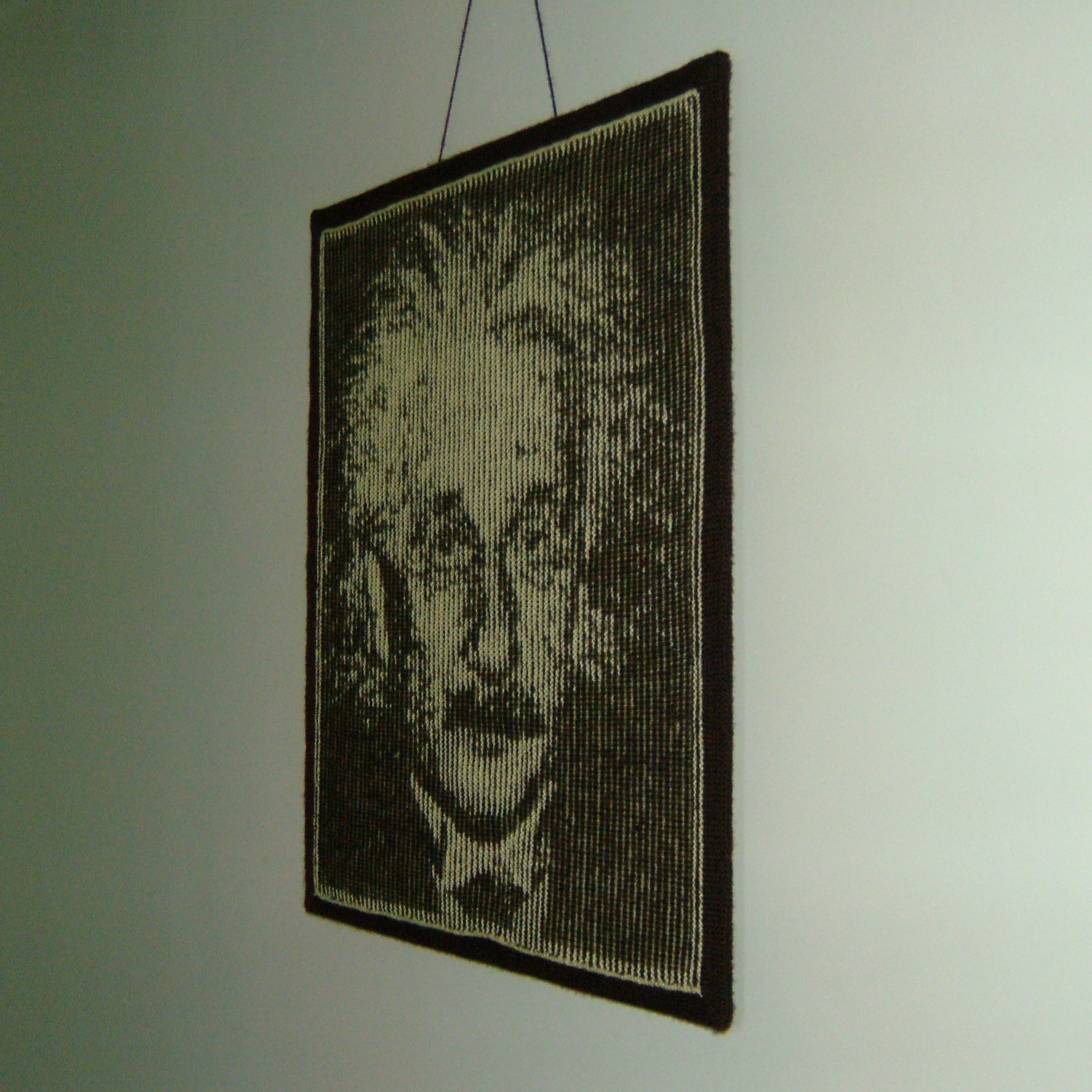

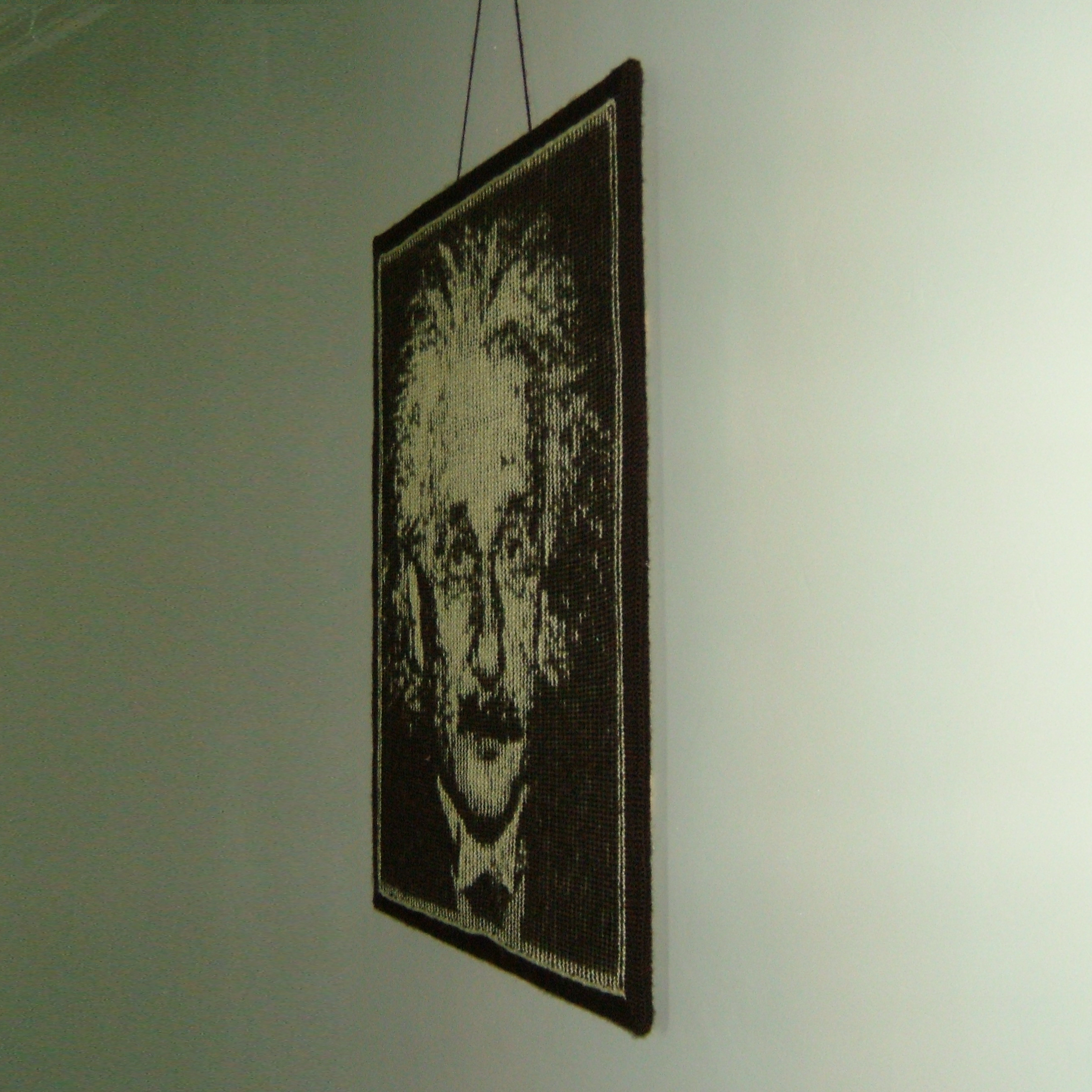

== Creating ==
=== Charting ===
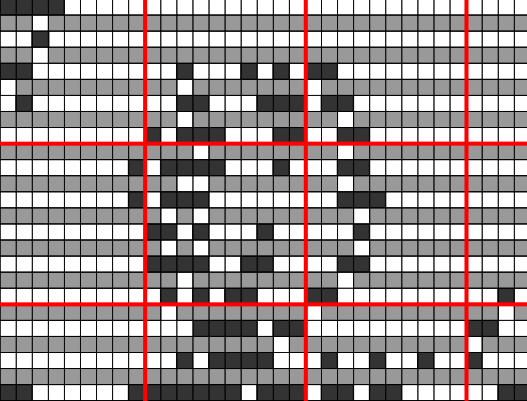
Detail of chart showing Marilyn Monroe's eye

Steve Plummer is a knitting artist who previously specialised in knitting wall-hangings and other items, primarily for the teaching of Mathematics. He approached illusion knitting from a mathematician's point of view and started to use a different method of charting.

These charts use a square grid and are created by laying the grid over an existing image then colouring in all the stitches that need to be seen as raised bumps. Throughout the charting process it is still possible to see the original image and there is no distortion. These charts are different because they allow the four rows of the traditional method to be condensed into two different rows of squares. They can be used for creating very simple images, if required, but also allow much more flexibility to create works of art. The old method allowed areas to show either light or dark; the new method allows for intermediate shading, still using just two colours and only one colour in each stripe. The amount of shading depends on the number of stitches that are raised compared to the number that are lowered.

Some of Steve's illusions are quite large. His Mona Lisa is significantly bigger than the real thing. The size is dictated by the smallest detail he wants to see, which, in a portrait, may be the centre of the eye. This then has to become one raised bump (garter stitch) on the knitting and the ridge in front of it must lie flat so you can see over it (stocking stitch). The rest of the image is built around this detail.

The charting process takes time and a certain amount of three-dimensional awareness. A chart can take up to 100 hours to produce.

=== Making and displaying ===
Yarn: Illusions can be made using any smooth yarn in two contrasting colours. The same chart will work equally well in fine or chunky yarn, though the thicker yarn will create a much bigger piece of knitting and the viewer may have to stand further back to get the best effect.

Needles: The clearest images are created by knitting on needles slightly thinner than recommended for the weight of the yarn used. If the art work is to be a bed-cover or wearable it needs to remain soft and flexible so should not be knitted too tightly.

Markers: It is essential to be able to keep your place on the chart so it helps to use markers to match to the grid lines, every 10 or 20 stitches.

Mounting pictures: If a piece is to hang on the wall it can be mounted on a board which will ensure that it remains flat. It should be very slightly stretched to prevent sagging.

Mounting wearables: Wearables, such as shawls, can be displayed on a bar with a strip of Velcro attached to it. They are easily removed for wearing.

=== Combining with other knitting techniques ===
It is possible to combine illusion knitting with other textile techniques. Those listed below have been used successfully. There are probably many other possibilities.

Intarsia can be used to introduce extra colours, as in the illusion of Marilyn Monroe, which was inspired by Andy Warhol's screen prints. It has four different colours. The same method of charting is used as only two colours occur in any one section, although the four sections are knitted as one piece.

Modular knitting lends itself to illusions as small areas can be made separately then combined.

Mitred knitting works well. The charting method needs to be adapted slightly to accommodate the different directions of the knitting.

== Geometric Illusion Art ==
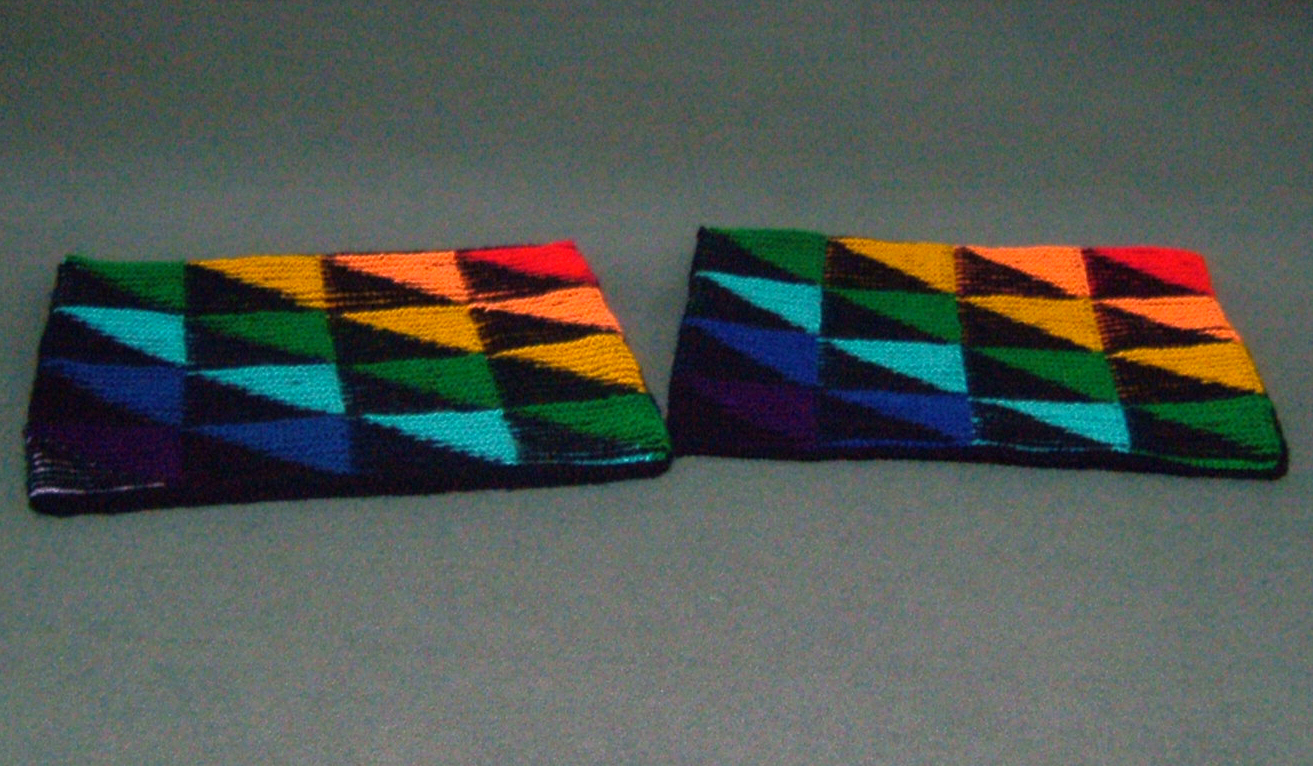
Seen from an angle the cushions look alike

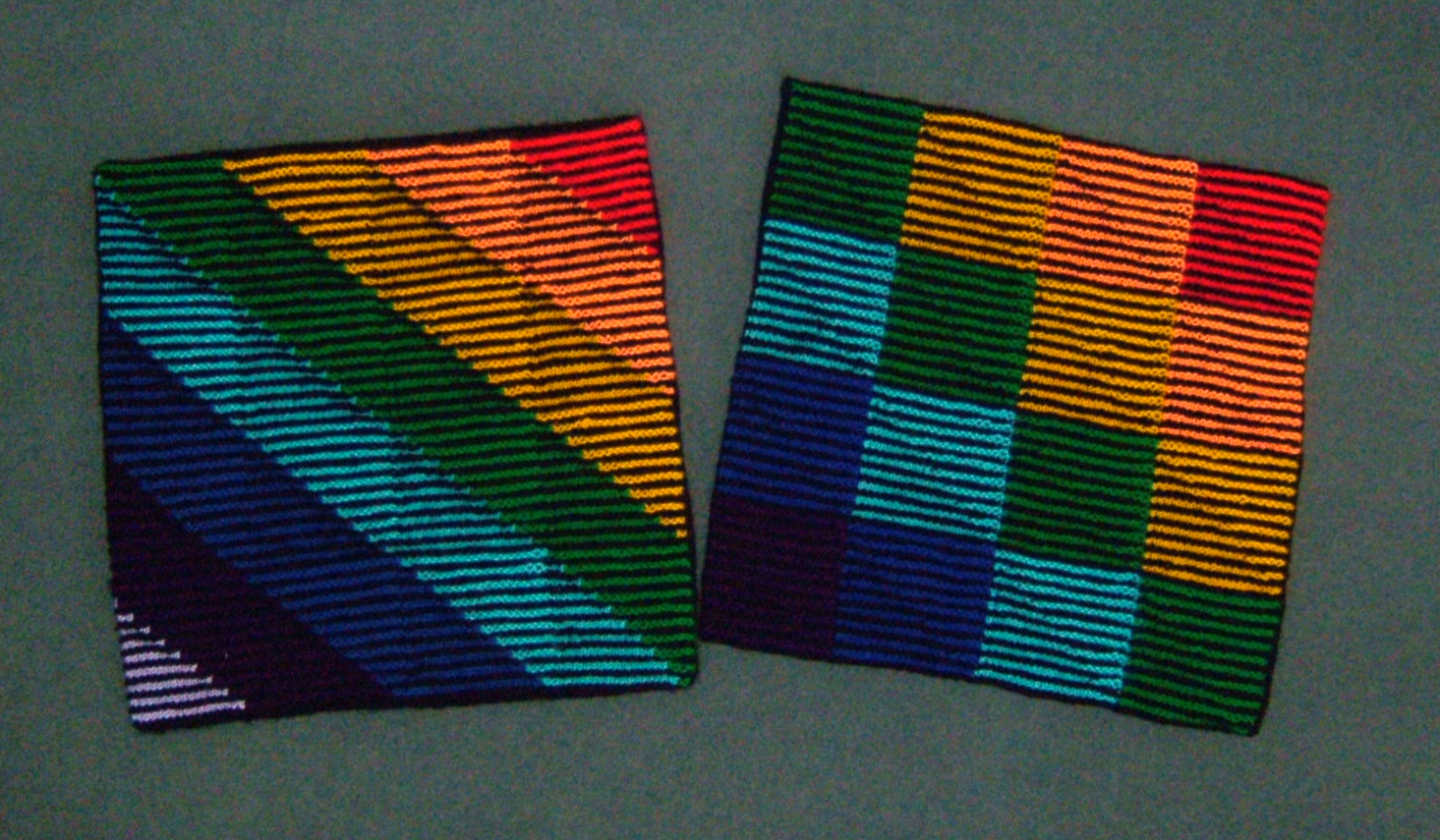
Seen from in front they are not the same

Illusion Art does not have to be pictorial. It also lends itself to geometric works. Sometimes the same illusion can be created in different ways. It is much less successful for abstract art. The brain needs to be able to perceive an image and fill in the gaps, which would be extremely difficult with an abstract design.

== Computational Approaches ==
In 2024 at the University of Washington, researchers forged a computational framework, which allows users to convert images into legitimate knittable patterns. This tool accelerates and simplifies the original process of hand-designing illusions to be knitted. This tool helps maximize efficiency when designing illusions, and minimizes the time it takes - down from potentially hundreds of hours that are spent hand knitting a single piece.

Their system also supports generating double-view illusions, that can show two completely different images from the fabric's respective viewing points. The system overlaps the two images, and then checks what colors need to appear in which locations. When one image needs to show black and the other needs to show white, the system replaces that given section with a "tile" that layers small patterns of black and white stripes. This technique makes the images actually legible, while maintaining a color very close to - but not perfectly black and white for either side.

Additionally, the framework introduces machine knitting scheduling algorithms that can handle color and texture changes all within a single row. This innovation makes it possible to manufacture illusion knits using industrial machinery. Remarkably, the creation of this framework signifies one of the first automated techniques for producing illusion knits.

== Exhibitions ==
Illusion Knitting Art is very new, the earliest exhibitions being held in 2010.

=== Steve Plummer and Pat Ashforth ===
- 2010: University of Stirling, Royal Horticultural Halls, Herbert Art Gallery and Museum and other smaller venues.
- 2011: London Science Museum.
- 2011: Haworth Art Gallery, UK: Einstein (above) was exhibited alongside 150 more conventional artworks at a juried exhibition and was voted the favourite piece, by visitors to the exhibition.
- 2012: Lafayette College, Pennsylvania, US.
- 2012–2013: Puzzling World, Wānaka, New Zealand.
- 2012: Seven pieces by Steve Plummer acquired by Ripley's Believe It or Not!. Exhibitions to be announced.
- 2012: Proserpine featured on BBC2 Paul Martin's Handmade Revolution

=== Tanja Boukal ===
- 2011: Vienna: Those In Darkness Drop From Sight.

== Artists ==
Artists working in this field include Steve Plummer, Pat Ashforth, Brent Annable, Tanja Boukal, Nelleke Kool, Julie Rosencrans, Lisa Lehner and George Maffett. Some of these artists have experimented with using computer programs to speed up the design process. So far, no program has been as good as the artist's eye. George Maffett uses a Lego 3-D modelling program to assist in the process.
