= Kiyan =

Kiyan may refer to:

- Kiyan, one of the mythical ancestors of the Mongols
- Kiyan Isfahan FSC, Iranian football club
- Kiyan Prince (1990–, English murder victim
- Kiyan Soltanpour (born 1989), Azerbaijani-Iranian footballer
- Kian Shahr, a city in Iran
- Kiyan Bala, a village in Iran
- Kiyan, Khuzestan, a village in Iran

== See also ==
- Kian (disambiguation)
