= Ghoreishi =

Ghoreishi (Persian: قریشی, adjective form of "Quraysh") – also occurring in the transliteration variants Ghorashi, Qorayshi or Quraishi – is an Iranian language surname. It is the romanization from the Persian language of the Muslim family name Qureshi (Arabic: قريشي) and may refer to:

- Ali Akbar Ghoreishi (born 1928), Iranian Shiite cleric
- Farrokh Ghoreishi (born 1951), retired Iranian-born English footballer
- Haleh Ghoreishi (born 1962), Iranian-born anthropologist who lives in the Netherlands
- Mehdi Ghoreishi (born 1990), Iranian footballer
- Setayesh Ghoreishi (born 2010), Afghan murder victim
- Seyed Mehdi Ghoreishi (born 19??), Iranian Shiite cleric

== See also ==
- List of people with surname Qureshi
