= Khayun =

Khayun may refer to:

- Khayan
- Sarab-e Kian
