= Kian (given name) =

- Pronunciation: Persian: [kiˈjɒːn]
- Gender: Male
- Language: English, Gaelic Irish, Persian

Origin
- Meaning: 'ancient'; 'king, realm'

Other names
- Alternative spelling: Cian, Keon, Kyan, Keion, Kiyan
- Variant forms: Kiana, Kiano, Kianda

Kian is the English variant of the Gaelic Irish given name Cian, meaning 'ancient'. A variant spelling is Kyan. Kian (Persian: کیان) is also a common Persian given name meaning 'king' or 'realm'.

People named Kian include:

- Kian (musician) (born Kian Brownfield in 2002), Australian singer/songwriter
- Kian Duncan, English footballer
- Kian Egan (born 1980), Irish singer
- Kian Emadi-Coffin (born 1992), British cyclist
- Kian Fitz-Jim (born 2003), Dutch footballer
- Kian Hansen (born 1989), Danish football player
- Kian Harratt (born 2002), English footballer
- Kian Kazemi (born 1986), Iranian-Filipino actor
- Kian Rosenberg Larsson (born 1992), Danish rapper
- Kian Lawley (born 1995), American YouTuber and actor
- Kian Pemberton, West Indian cricketer
- Kian Pirfalak (c. 2013–2022), nine-year-old killed by Iranian security forces
- Kian Ronan (born 2001), Gibraltarian footballer
- Kian Scales (born 2002), English footballer
- Kian Slor (born 2002), Dutch footballer
- Kian Soltani (born 1992), Austrian-Iranian cellist

== See also ==
- Cian a figure in Irish mythology
- Kayanian dynasty
- Kian (disambiguation)
