= Hot Looks =

Fashion doll line

- Type: Doll
- Company: Mattel
- Country: United States, Canada

Hot Looks were posable 19 inch "fashion model" dolls made by Mattel in 1987 and 1988.

== Material ==
The doll's bodies were made from stockinette with a sturdy, bendable armature within to aid in posing, and their heads were vinyl with long, thick rooted vinyl hair, and inset faceted button-like earring studs, upon which hoops and various other dangles could be hung.

== Temperature concept ==
The line was introduced in the 1987 Mattel Toy Catalog, with a textual crash course on the concept of fashion "temperatures", describing color schemes that were deemed appropriate for certain complexions and coloring: people (or dolls) with dark hair and eyes were dubbed "Hot", and were suggested to wear fashions with bright, vivid, dramatic colors; those with red hair and green eyes were considered "Medium", where earth tone colors were suggested; while blondes and light-haired individuals were seen as "Cool", and were prescribed fashions with icy pastel shades.

== 1987 line ==
The five dolls in the 1987 line-up, all international teenage models at The Hot Looks Modeling Agency, were:

- Zizi ("Hot", #3899) from Kenya.
- Elkie ("Cool", #3703) from Sweden
- Chelsea ("Warm", #3704) from England
- Mimi ("Cool", #3702) from France
- Stacey ("Hot", #3701) from the United States.

Twelve additional fashions were sold separately for the dolls in 1987, four in each of the three temperature ranges. A Hot Looks Fashion Kit was also available, a large hexagonal black-and-white plastic case filled with additional shoes, belts, earring dangles, and other fashion accessories.

== 1988 line ==
In 1988, all the talk of fashion temperatures was judiciously edited out of the proceedings. The line expanded, with four new dolls, eight new extra outfits, and three new accessory assortments. but not all of these items were released worldwide. The four new dolls received a couple of noteworthy alterations from their 1987 predecessors: their inset stud earrings were changed to large round beads, with figural dangles being inserted from underneath, and their pinky fingers, which were extended on the 1987 dolls, were streamlined into an "easier to dress" mitten-like fabric hand. The new models were:

- Starr (#5510) from Hollywood
- Sachi (#5522) from Japan
- Steff (#5516) from Australia
- Shawna (#5517) from Scotland,

They were released in limited markets in Canada, while the new clothing and accessory sets were available in the U.S. and elsewhere. Eight of the twelve 1987 outfits were reissued, and given names to go along with their stock numbers, and to match the new packaging of the 1988 releases. Any model could-- and DID-- wear any extra outfit in the 1988 Catalog, regardless of their previously prescribed fashion temperature.

Interestingly, the 1988 Mattel Catalog spelled the names of two of the 1987 dolls in a unique way: ZiZi and MiMi each received additional capitalization in the text for their entries.
