= Quiana =

Quiana and Quianna is a given name. Notable people with the name include:

- Quianna Chaney (born 1986), American basketball player
- Quiana Grant (born 1982), American model
- Quiana Lynell (born 1981), American blues and jazz singer, arranger, and songwriter
- Quiana Smith, American stage actress

== See also ==
- Kiana (given name)
- Qiana
