= Intarsia (knitting) =

Knitting technique for creating multicolored patterns

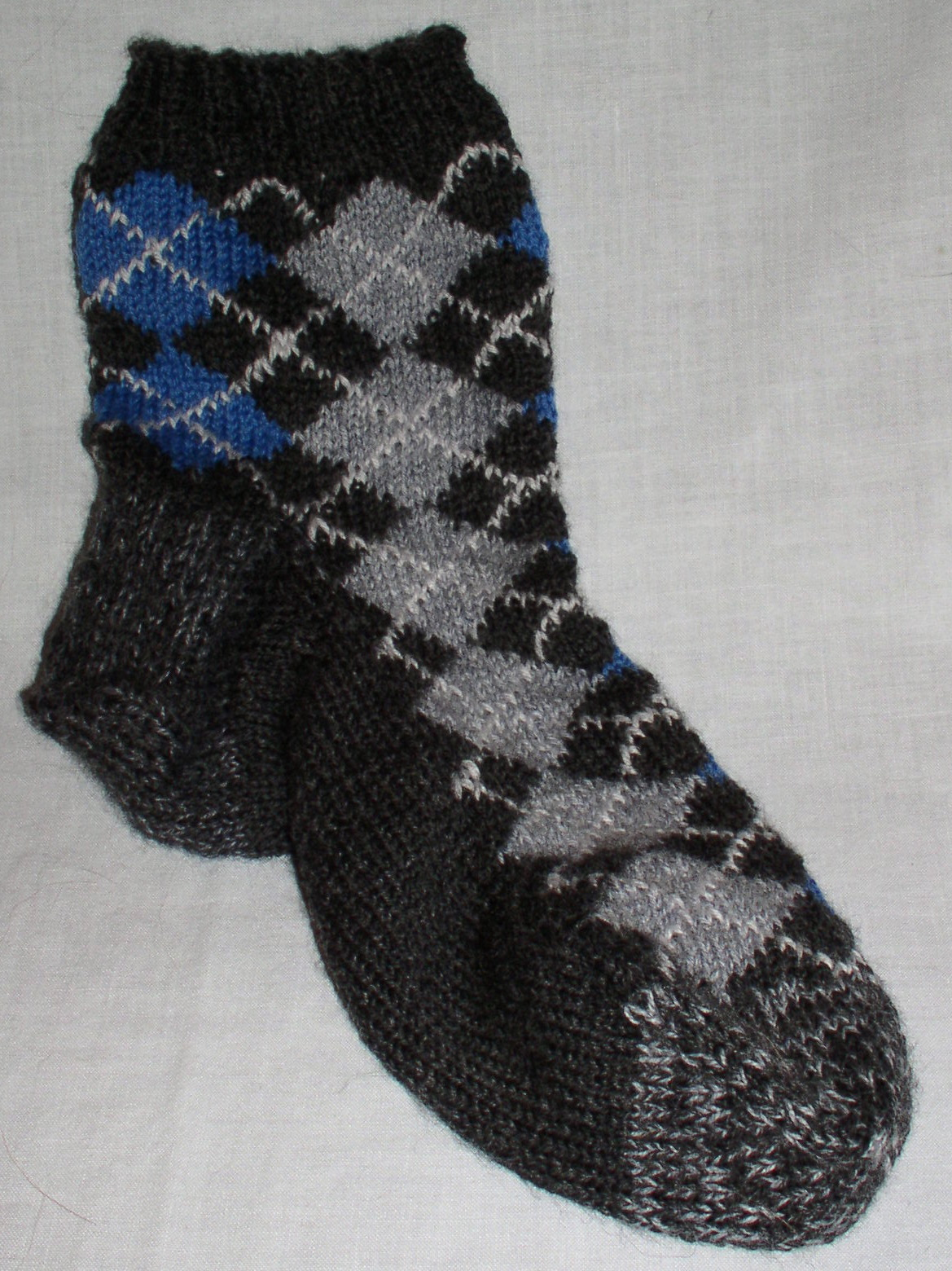
An argyle sock, knit using intarsia

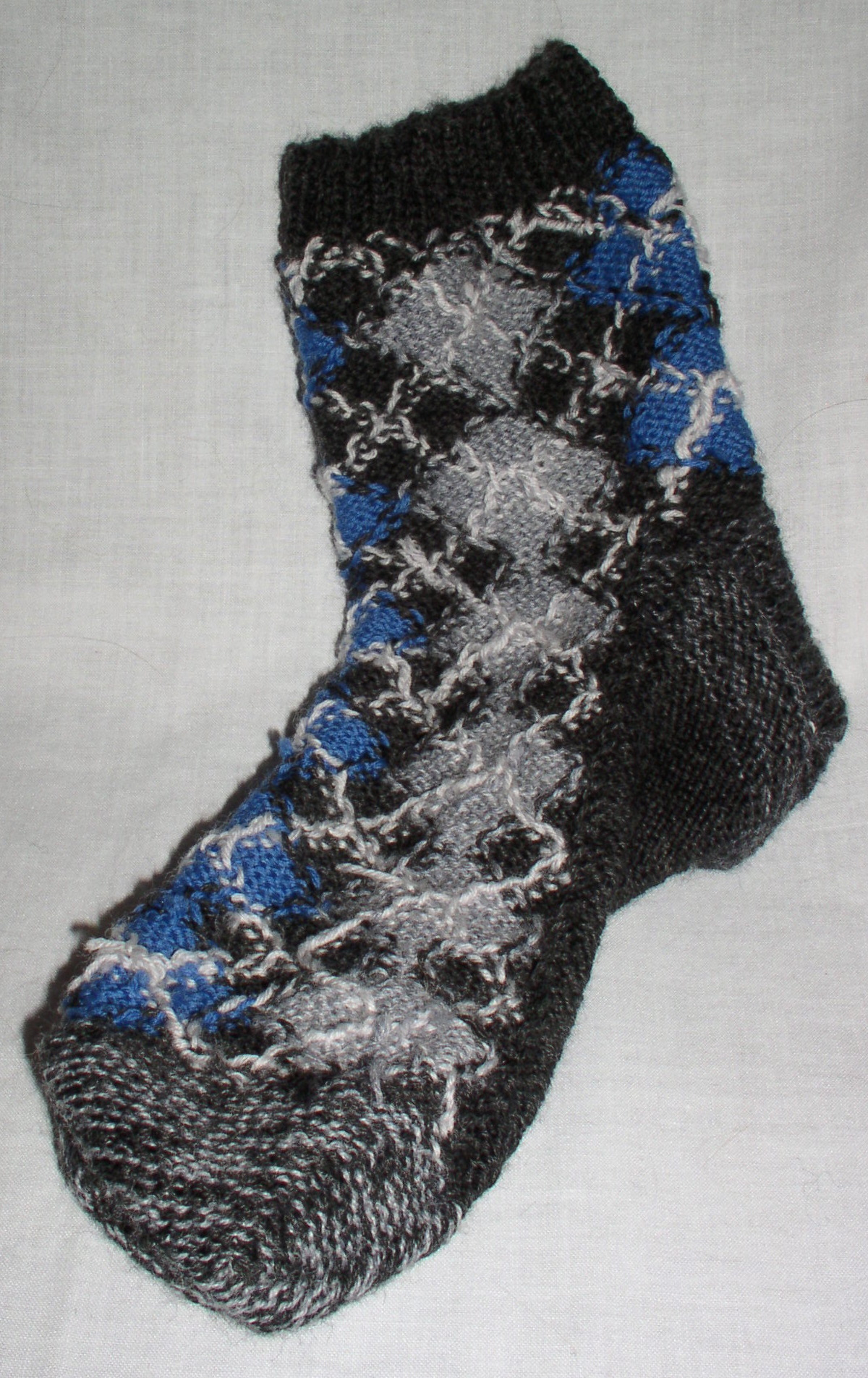
The inside of the same argyle sock, showing the lack of carried strands, and the twist at each change of colour

Intarsia is a knitting technique used to create patterns with multiple colours. As with the woodworking technique of the same name, fields of different colours and materials appear to be inlaid in one another, fit together like a jigsaw puzzle.

Unlike other multicolour techniques (including Fair Isle, slip-stitch colour, and double knitting), there is only one "active" colour on any given stitch, and yarn is not carried across the back of the work; when a colour changes on a given row, the old yarn is left hanging. This means that any intarsia piece is topologically several disjoint columns of colour; a simple blue circle on a white background involves one column of blue and two of white—one for the left and one for the right. Intarsia is most often worked flat, rather than in the round. However, it is possible to knit intarsia in circular knitting using particular techniques.

Common examples of intarsia include sweaters with large, solid-colour features like fruits, flowers, or geometric shapes. Argyle socks and sweaters are normally done in intarsia, although the thin diagonal lines are often overlaid in a later step, using Swiss darning or sometimes just a simple backstitch.

== Technique ==
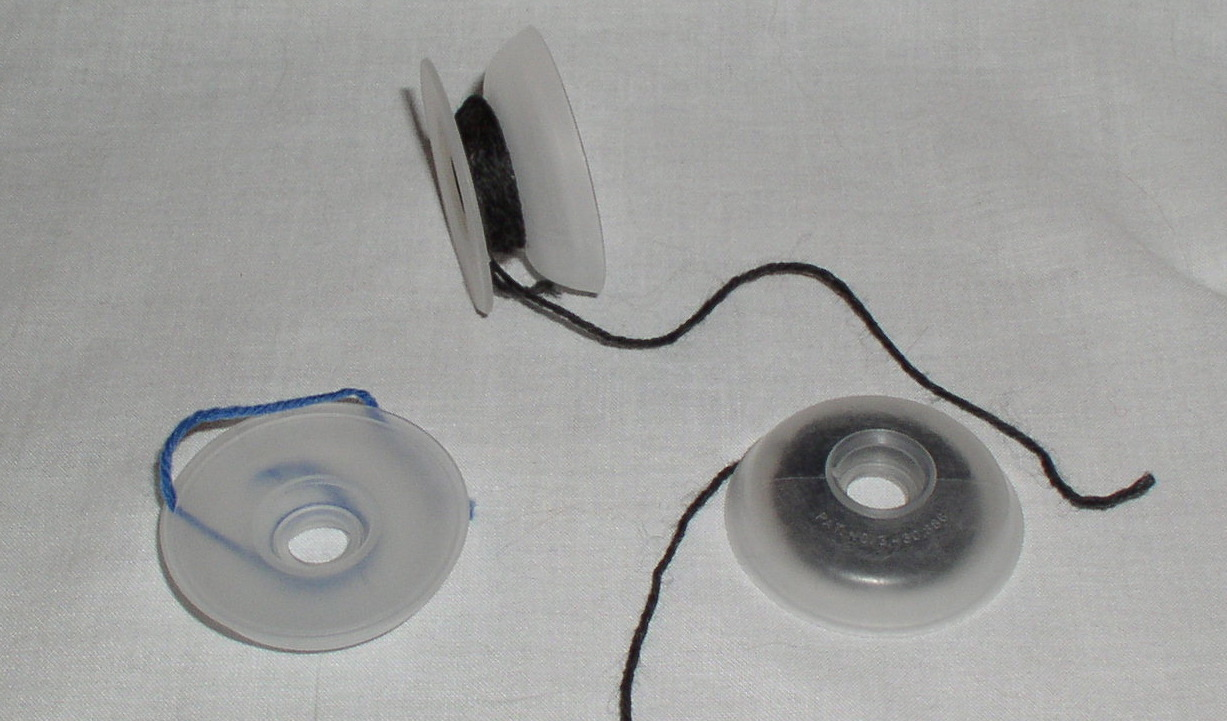
Intarsia bobbins

Knitting in intarsia theoretically requires no additional skills beyond being generally comfortable with the basic knit and purl stitches. Materials required include multiple colours of yarn, standard needles, and bobbins. Bobbins serve to contain the inactive yarn and help keep it from getting tangled. Unlike the narrow, wooden ones used to make bobbin lace, modern intarsia bobbins resemble translucent plastic yo-yos that can snap tight to prevent the yarn from unwinding.

After winding a few yards of each colour onto its own bobbin (and possibly several bobbins' worth of some colours), the knitter simply begins knitting their pattern. When they arrive at a point where the colour changes, the knitter brings the new colour up underneath the old one (to prevent holes) and starts knitting with it. If flat knitting, at the end of the row, the piece is turned round just as with regular knitting, and the knitter returns the way they came.

The simplest intarsia pattern is for straight vertical stripes. After the first row, the pattern is continued by always working each stitch in the same colour as the previous row, changing colours at exactly the same point in each row. To make more elaborate patterns, one can let this colour boundary drift from row to row, changing colours a few stitches earlier or later each time.

Intarsia patterns are almost always given as charts (which, because of the mechanics of knitting, are read beginning at the lower right and continuing upward). The charts generally look like highly pixellated cartoon drawings, in this sense resembling dot-matrix computer graphics or needlepoint patterns (though usually without the colour nuance of the latter).

== Knitting intarsia in the round ==
There are several techniques to execute intarsia when circular knitting. Executing intarsia "in-the-round" eliminates the need for seams and, in one case, turning the piece and working from the wrong side. Priscilla Gibson-Roberts discusses four techniques for knitting intarsia in the round in her book, Ethnic Socks & Stockings.

== Bibliography ==
- Hiatt, June Hemmons (1988). The Principles of Knitting: Methods and Techniques of Hand Knitting. Simon and Schuster. ISBN 978-0-671-55233-6.
- Robinson, Debby (1986). The Encyclopedia of Knitting Techniques. London: Michael Joseph (Mermaid Books). ISBN 0-7181-3124-X.
- Stanley, Montse (2001). Knitter's Handbook: A Comprehensive Guide to the Principles and Techniques of Handknitting. Reader's Digest. ISBN 978-0-7621-0248-8.
- Malcolm, Trisha, ed. (2002). Vogue Knitting: The Ultimate Knitting Book (updated ed.). New York: Sixth and Spring Books. ISBN 978-1-931543-16-3.
