= Ponte (fabric) =

Type of knit fabric pattern

Ponte, also known as Ponte di Roma, is a thick, double knit fabric design produced on knitting machines. It has a firmer, heavier, and more stable structure compared to other knits, as well as a subtle sheen. As with most of the other double knit designs, Ponte is reversible.

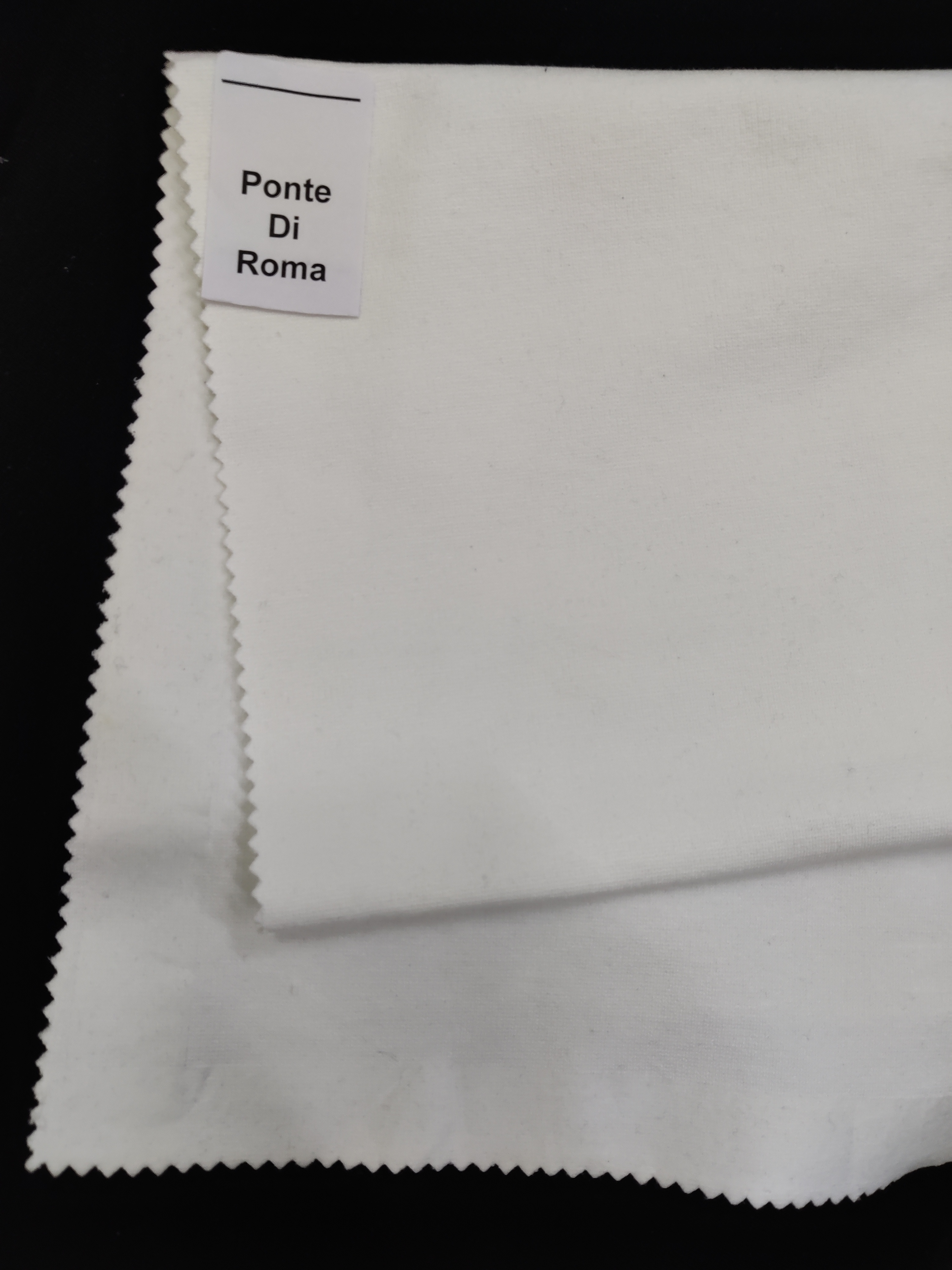
Ponte fabric (Ponte di Roma)

== Origin ==
Knitters first developed Ponte in Italy. Ponte di Roma means "Roman Bridge" which is suggested by the arrangement of loops.

== Construction ==
Ponte is a double knit, weft knitting design produced on Rib/Interlock circular knitting machines by manipulating stockinette stitch, using at least two yarn feeds, looping now on one set of needles, now on the other, to knit two fabrics joined together. It is similar to Milano rib, but repeats on four courses.

== Characteristics ==
Ponte fabric has a heavier structure, and has increased strength and durability when compared to regular knitted fabrics. Ponte is fabric with moderate stretch and drape durability. The gsm is over 300. Fabric edges do not curl, unlike single knit fabrics.

== Use ==
The fabric characteristics make it suitable for bottoms such as skirts, treggings, jeggings, track pants, shorts, dresses, and jackets.
