= Kyan =

Kyan is a surname and a given name, meaning 'ancient' or 'enduring'. It is an alternative spelling of the given name Kian, which is a variant of ancient Irish Cian. Notable people with the name include:

== Surname ==
- Anselan O Kyan, 11th-century Irish nobleman
- Binnya Kyan (disambiguation), several people
- Chōtoku Kyan (1870–1945), Japanese karate master
- Kyan, known as Daw Kyan (1918–2019), Burmese historian and writer
- John Howard Kyan (1774–1850), Irish inventor of the 'kyanising' process for preserving wood

== Given name ==
- Kyan Anderson (born 1992), American basketball player
- Kyan Douglas (born 1970), American actor
- Kyan Khojandi (born 1982), French comedian, actor and director
- Kyan Vaesen (born 2001), Belgian footballer
- Kyan van Dorp (born 2000), Dutch footballer

== See also ==
- Kyan Castle, Okinawa, Japan
- Cian, a figure in Irish mythology
- Cayenne pepper, formerly known as "kyan pepper"
