= Basic knitted fabrics =

Group of knit fabrics based on common stitching techniques

Basic knitted fabrics include stocking stitch, reverse stocking stitch, garter stitch, seed stitch, faggoting, and tricot. In some cases, these fabrics appear differently on the right side (as seen when making the stitch) than on the wrong side (as seen from the other side, when the work is turned).

== Stockinette/stocking stitch and reverse stockinette stitch ==
Stocking stitch (in US, stockinette stitch) is the most basic knitted fabric; every stitch (as seen from the right side) is a knit stitch. This fabric has also been referred to as Knit or Knitted, Front, Smooth, Jersey, Plain, Vertical and Plain Sweater Fabric. In the round, stocking stitch is produced by knitting every stitch; by contrast, in the flat, stocking stitch is produced by knitting and purling alternate rows. Variations on this fabric can be made by twisting stitches (knitting or purling through the back of each loop on the needle instead of the front) on one or both sides; Barbara Walker calls these "crossed" (only knitted stitches twisted) and "twisted" (knits and purl twisted) Stockinette.

Stocking-stitch fabric is very smooth and each column ("wale") resembles a stacked set of "V"'s. It has a strong tendency to curl horizontally and vertically because of the asymmetry of its faces.

Reverse stocking stitch (also called Reverse Stockinette, Rough Fabric, Wrong Fabric) is produced in the same way as stocking, except that the purl stitches are done on the right side and the knit stitches on the wrong side. In the round, reverse stocking stitch is produced by purling every stitch.

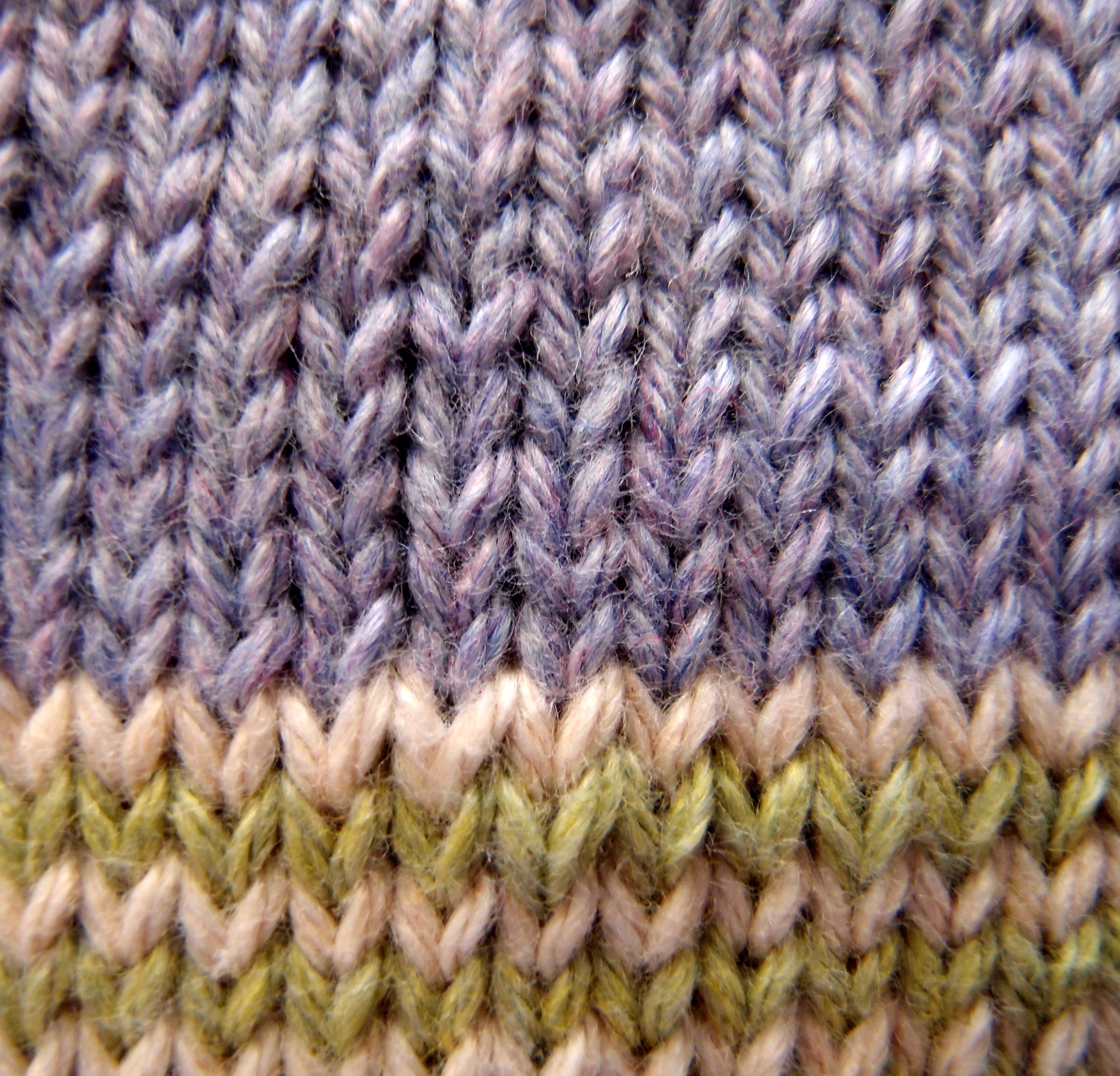
Stockinette stitch front

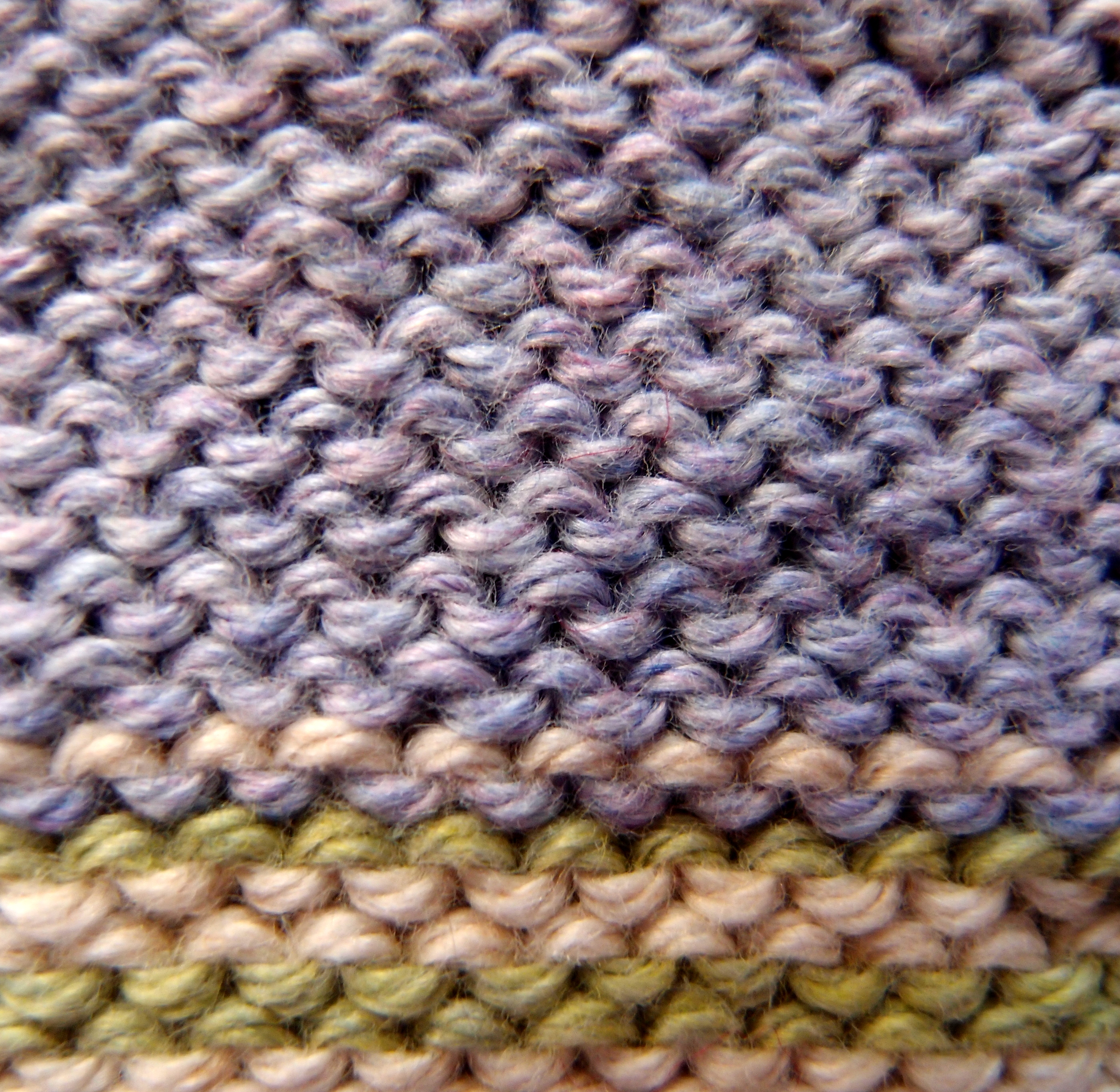
Back of stockinette stitch, also same appearance as reverse stockinette stitch

== Garter stitch ==
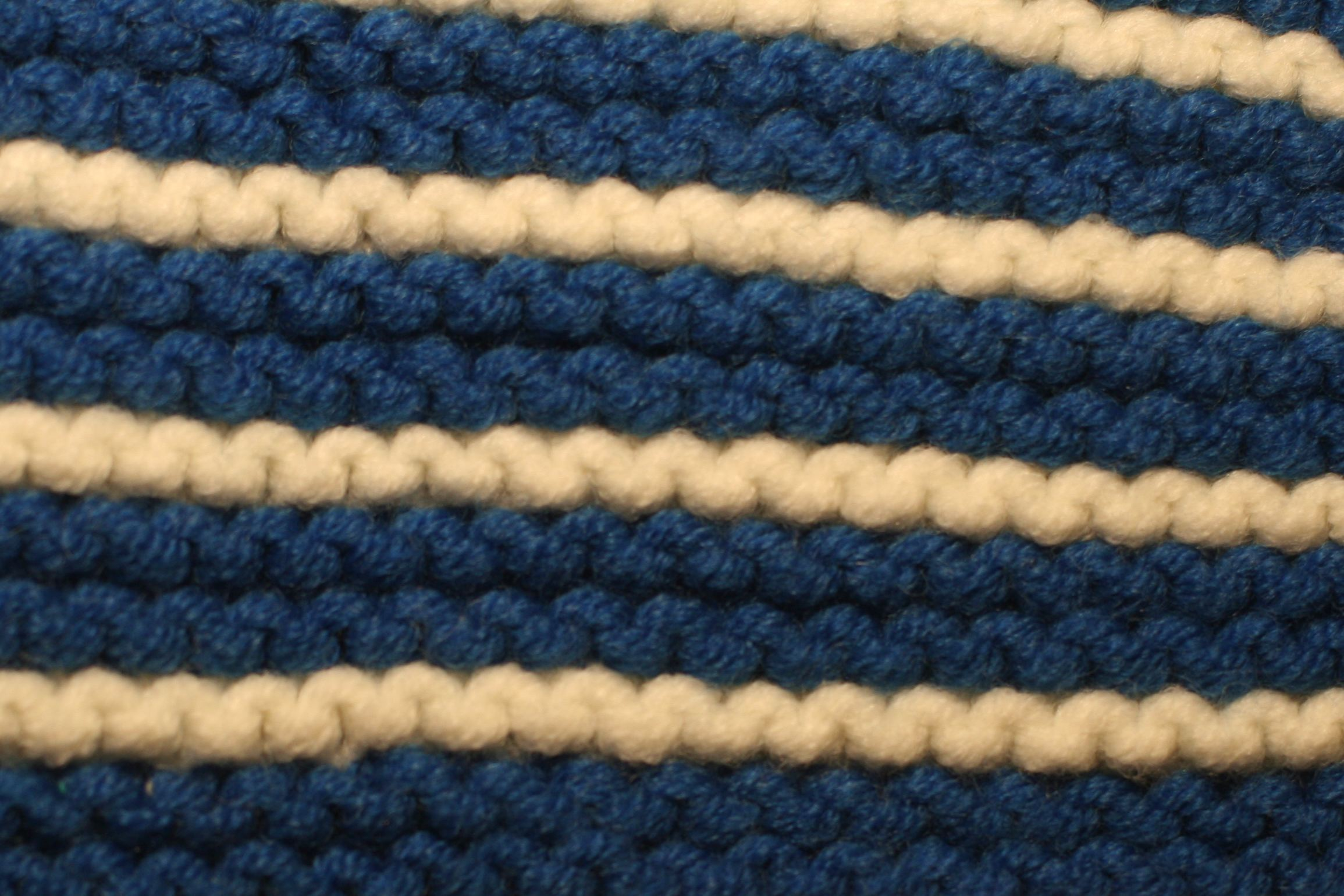
Garter stitch

Garter stitch is the most basic form of welting (as seen from the right side). In the round, garter stitch is produced by knitting and purling alternate rounds. By contrast, in the flat, garter stitch is produced by knitting every stitch (or purling every stitch, though this is much less common, and often referred to as 'reverse garter stitch').

In garter-stitch fabrics, the "purl" rows stand out from the "knit" rows ( a similar effect is used in shadow knitting). Together, they form little horizontal ridges. Garter-stitch fabric has significant lengthwise elasticity and little tendency to curl, due to the symmetry of its faces.

== Seed/moss stitch ==
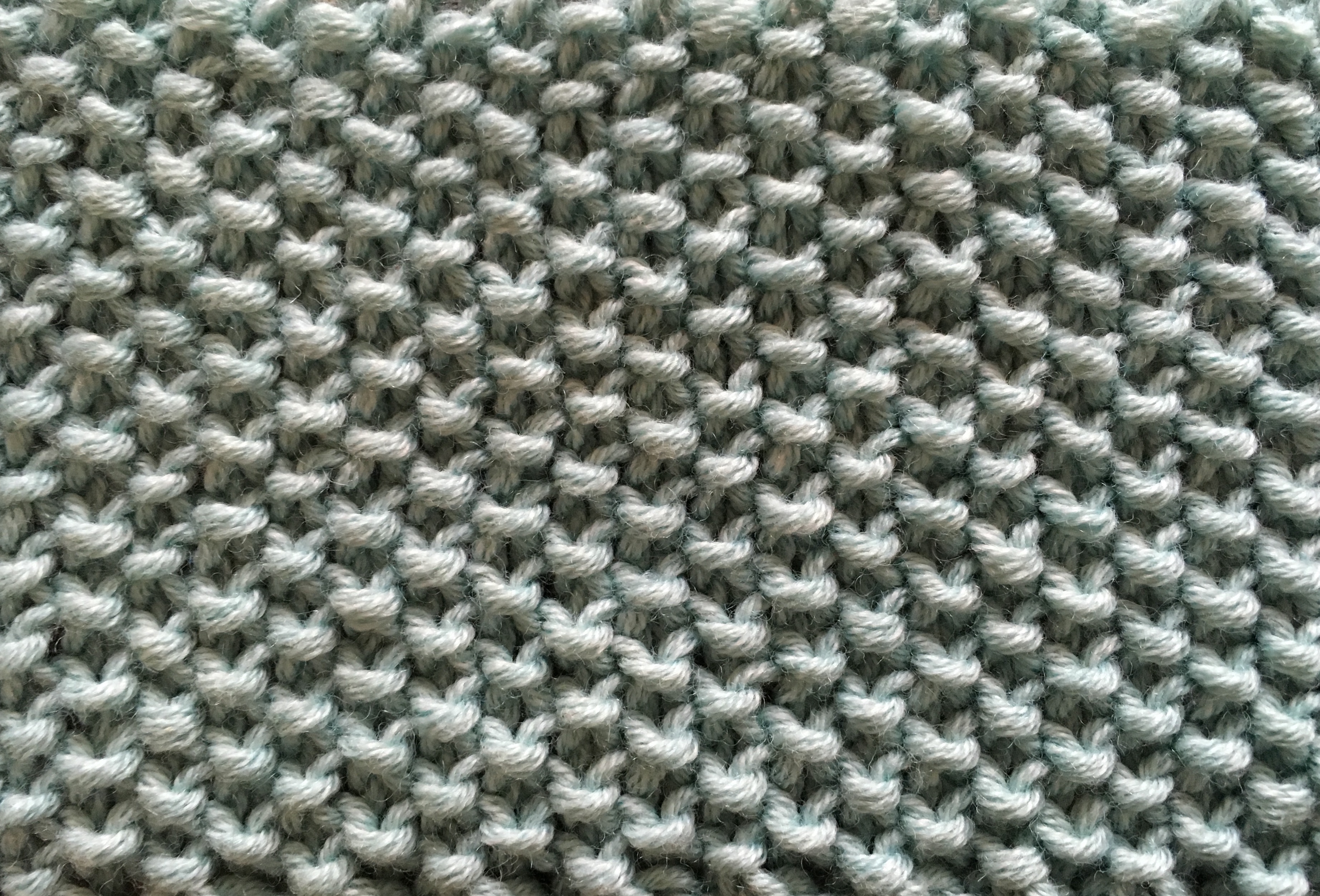
Moss stitch

Seed stitch is the most basic form of a basketweave pattern; knit and purl stitches alternate in every column ("wale") and every row ("course"). In other words, every knit stitch is flanked on all four sides (left and right, top and bottom) by purl stitches, and vice versa. Moss stitch (also called Irish/American moss stitch) is created by alternating between knit and purl stitches across every row as well. Here, however, there are always two knit stitches stacked upon each other in every column and they are flanked by two purl stitches on all four sides.

Seed/moss-stitch fabrics lie flat; the symmetry of their two faces prevents them from curling to one side or the other. Hence, it makes an excellent choice for edging, e.g., the central edges of a cardigan. However, seed stitch is "nubbly", not nearly as smooth as stockinette/stocking stitch.

== Faggoting ==
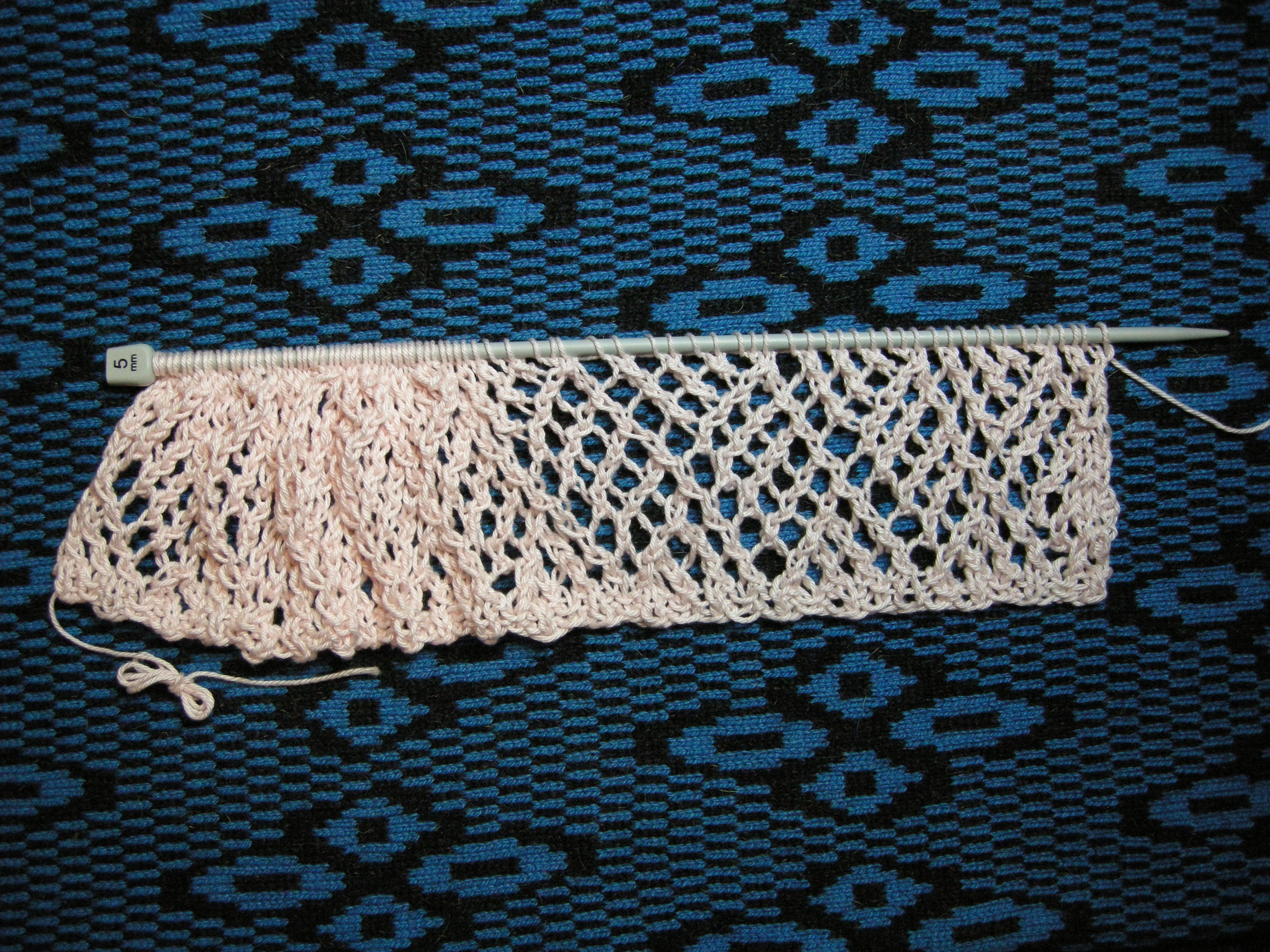
Faggoting lace

Faggoting is a variation of lace knitting, in which every stitch is a yarn over or a decrease. There are several types of faggoting, but all are an extremely open lace similar to netting.

Like most lace fabrics, faggoting has little structural strength and deforms easily, so it has little tendency to curl despite being asymmetrical. Faggoting is stretchy and open, and most faggoting stitches look the same on both sides, making them ideal for garments like lacy scarves or stockings.

== Tricot knitting ==
Tricot is a special case of warp knitting, in which the yarn zigzags vertically, following a single column ("wale") of knitting, rather than a single row ("course"), as is customary. Tricot and its relatives are very resistant to runs, and are commonly used in lingerie.

== Other basic fabrics ==
Other classes of basic knitted fabrics include ribbing, welting, and cables.

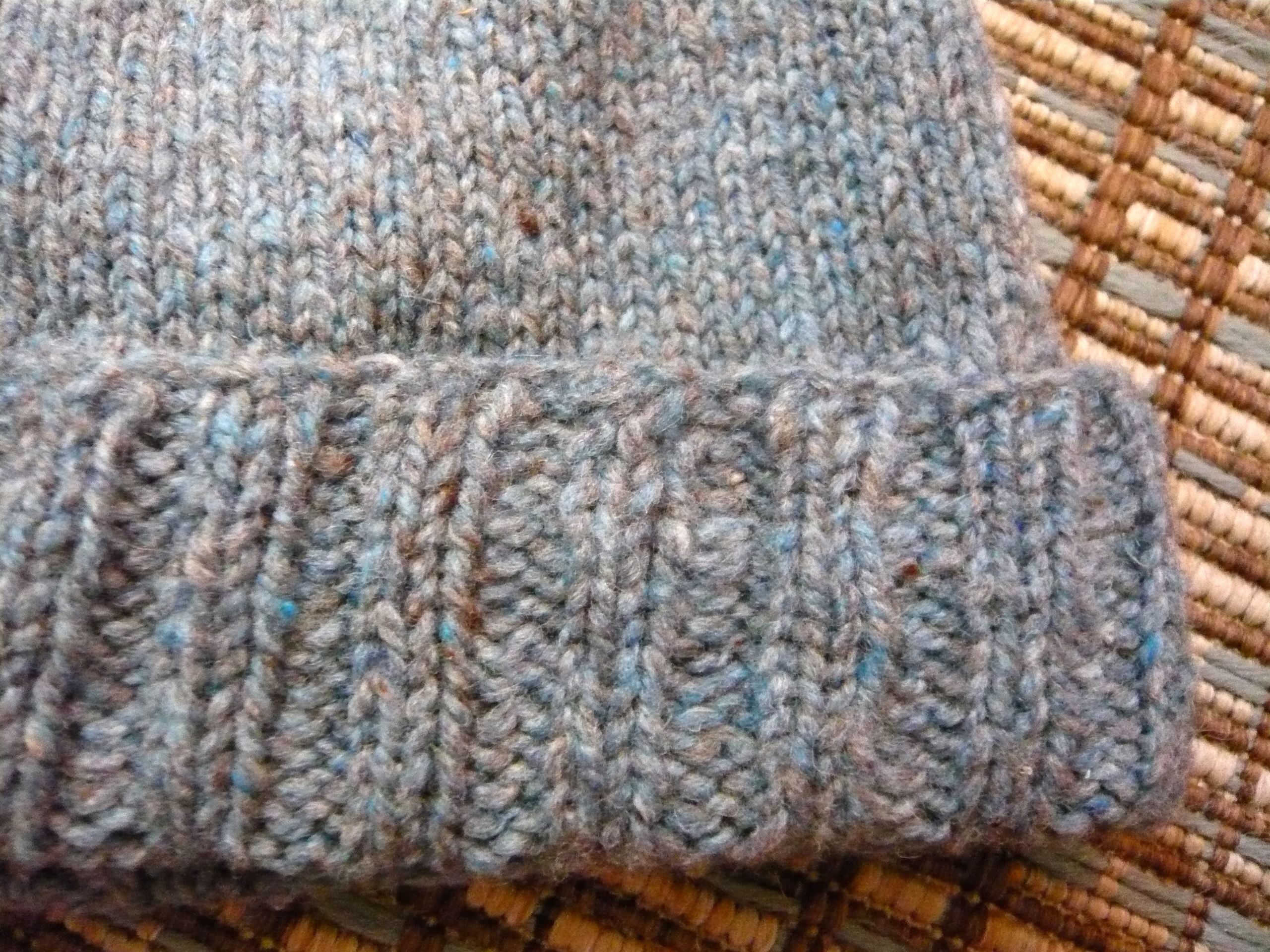
The bottom of this piece shows an example of ribbing, created by alternating knit stitches and purl stitches across the same row.

== See also ==
- Pointelle
- Ponte (Fabric)
