= Keanu (disambiguation) =

Keanu Reeves (born 1964) is a Canadian actor.

Keanu may also refer to:

- Keanu (film), a 2016 American comedy film

== People ==
- Keanu Asing (born 1993), American surfer
- Keanu Baccus (born 1998), Australian soccer player
- Keanu Marsh-Brown (born 1992), English footballer
- Keanu Neal (born 1995), American football player
- Keanu Pinder (born 1995), Australian basketball player
- Keanu Staude (born 1997), German soccer player
- Keanu Vers (born 1996), South African rugby union footballer

=== Fictional characters ===
- Keanu Taylor, a fictional character from the British soap opera EastEnders

== See also ==
- "Keanu Reeves" (song), a 2019 single by Logic
- "Keanu Reeves Reply", a 2004 song by Fiona Sit off the album 'F' Debut
