= Binnya Kyan (disambiguation) =

Binnya Kyan was the 13th king of Hanthawaddy (r. 1451–1453).

Binnya Kyan or Banya Kyan may also refer to:

- Binnya Kyan of Martaban, Viceroy or Martaban (r. 1422–1442/43)
- Binnya Kyan (minister) (served 1526–1538)
- Binnya Kyan, the childhood princely title of Binnya Dhammaraza, King of Hanthawaddy (r. 1421–1424)
