= Kian-e Nesar =

Kian-e Nesar کيان نسار
- Village
- Location within Iran
- Coordinates: 33°24′53″N 48°43′14″E
- Country: Iran
- Province: Lorestan
- County: Khorramabad
- Bakhsh: Zagheh
- Rural District: Zagheh

Population (2006)
  - Total: 32
- Time zone: UTC+3:30 (IRST)
  - Summer (DST): UTC+4:30 (IRDT)

Kian-e Nesar (Persian: کيان نسار, also Romanized as Kīān-e Nesār and Kayān-e Nesār; also known as Kīān-e ‘Olyā) is a village in Zagheh Rural District, Zagheh District, Khorramabad County, Lorestan Province, Iran. At the 2006 census, its population was 32, in 6 families.
