= Kiun =

Kiun كيون
- Village
- Location within Iran
- Coordinates: 36°11′36″N 52°38′26″E
- Country: Iran
- Province: Mazandaran
- County: Babol
- Bakhsh: Bandpey-ye Sharqi
- Rural District: Firuzjah

Population (2006)
  - Total: 18
- Time zone: UTC+3:30 (IRST)
  - Summer (DST): UTC+4:30 (IRDT)

Kiun (Persian: كيون, also romanized as Kīūn; also known as Kīān) is a village in Firuzjah Rural District, Bandpey-ye Sharqi District, Babol County, Mazandaran Province, Iran. At the 2006 census, its population was 18, in 6 families.
