= Kiana Aran =

American biomedical entrepreneur and professor

Prof. Kiana Aran
- Education: Keck Graduate Institute; City College of New York; Rutgers University
- Scientific career
- Workplaces: University of California, San Diego; CRISPR QC Inc. Paragraf Ltd. Cardea Bio Inc. University of California, Berkeley
- Thesis: Development of microfluidic platform for continuous extraction of diagnostics plasma proteins from whole blood during cardiac surgery (2012)

Kiana Aran is a biomedical entrepreneur and Associate Professor at both UC San Diego's School of Medicine and UC San Diego's Jacobs School of Engineering in the Department of Bioengineering. She is also the Chief Innovation Officer at Paragraf Ltd. Paragraf, a UK-based semi-conductor company, acquired Cardea Bio Inc., which she co-founded and ran as the Chief Science Offer. She has also helped co-found CRISPR QC Inc. that offers a CRISPR Analytics Platform that helps pharma and biotech companies optimize their gene editing research. Her overall research and inventions are focused around developing technologies and bioelectronics for multi-omics studies and applications, especially when they enable products and technologies for studying the mechanisms of healthy aging. She became known as the pioneer of fusing CRISPR and electronics, resulting in the CRISPR-chip technology that is being used to improve the quality of genotyping and gene editing. She was awarded the 2021 Nature – Estée Lauder Research Award for Inspiring Women in Science.

== Early life and education ==
Aran was an undergraduate student at City College of New York and majored in electrical engineering. She was a graduate student at Rutgers University, where she focused on biomedical engineering. For her doctoral research she worked on a microfluidic platform for the extraction of diagnostic plasma proteins. The microfluidic platform was designed to work in a clinical environment and offer the continuous monitoring of the inflammatory response of patients undergoing cardiac surgeries. The system designed by Aran comprised a two-compartment mass chamber, which allows for the continuous separation of blood plasma from blood cells with no evidence of cell lysis. A 200 nm pore size membrane can extract 15% of pure plasma at high sampling frequencies. She moved to the University of California, Berkeley as a graduate student, where she worked on bioelectronics.

== Research and career ==
Aran has continued to develop novel bioelectronics and biosensing platforms and their applications. She invented the CRISPR-chip, an electronic sensor that uses CRISPR-Cas to scan genomes and samples of nucleic acid for disease mutations. The chip integrates Clustered Regularly Interspaced Short Palindromic Repeat (CRISPR) with single molecule graphene field-effect transistors to generate electronic signals when CRISPR interacts with target DNA/RNA. She has demonstrated that the CRISPR-Chip can detect the mutations associated with sickle cell and Duchenne muscular dystrophy.

Aran was the co-founder and Chief Scientific Officer of Cardea, a biotechnology company.

Aran serves on the Executive Advisory Board of the World.Minds Foundation, where she contributes to interdisciplinary conversations on biotechnology, health, and innovation.

== Awards and honors ==
- 2020 Clinical OMICs 10 under 40 Award
- 2020 Athena Pinnacle Award
- 2021 NSF Career Award
- 2021 Nature Research Awards for Inspiring Women in Science
- 2022 Dr. Kiana Aran 2nd woman since 1960 to receive Rutgers' Distinguished Engineer, Medal of Excellence award
- 2023 Dr. Kiana Aran makes Inc.'s 2023 Female Founders list
- 2024 National Academies of Sciences, Engineering, and Medicine’s New Voices in Sciences, Engineering, and Medicine: Prof. Kiana Aran
- 2024 UC San Diego engineering faculty Kiana Aran has been named a Senior Member of the National Academy of Inventors

== Selected publications ==
- Reza Hajian; Sarah Balderston; Thanhtra Tran; et al. (2019). "Detection of unamplified target genes via CRISPR-Cas9 immobilized on a graphene field-effect transistor". Nature biomedical engineering. 3 (6): 427–437. doi:10.1038/s41551-019-0371-x. PMC 6556128. PMID 31097816. Wikidata Q92091982.
- Kiana Aran; Lawrence A Sasso; Neal Kamdar; Jeffrey D Zahn (2010). "Irreversible, direct bonding of nanoporous polymer membranes to PDMS or glass microdevices". Lab on a Chip. 10 (5): 548–552. doi:10.1039/b924816a. PMC 4538600. PMID 20162227. Wikidata Q35961114.
- Kiana Aran; Alex Fok; Lawrence A. Sasso; Neal Kamdar; Yulong Guan; Qi Sun; Akif Ündar; Jeffrey D. Zahn (2011). "Microfiltration platform for continuous blood plasma protein extraction from whole blood during cardiac surgery". Lab on a Chip. 11 (17): 2858–2868. doi:10.1039/c1lc20080a. PMC 4538598. PMID 21750810. Wikidata Q35961102.
