= Double knitting =

Form of hand knitting

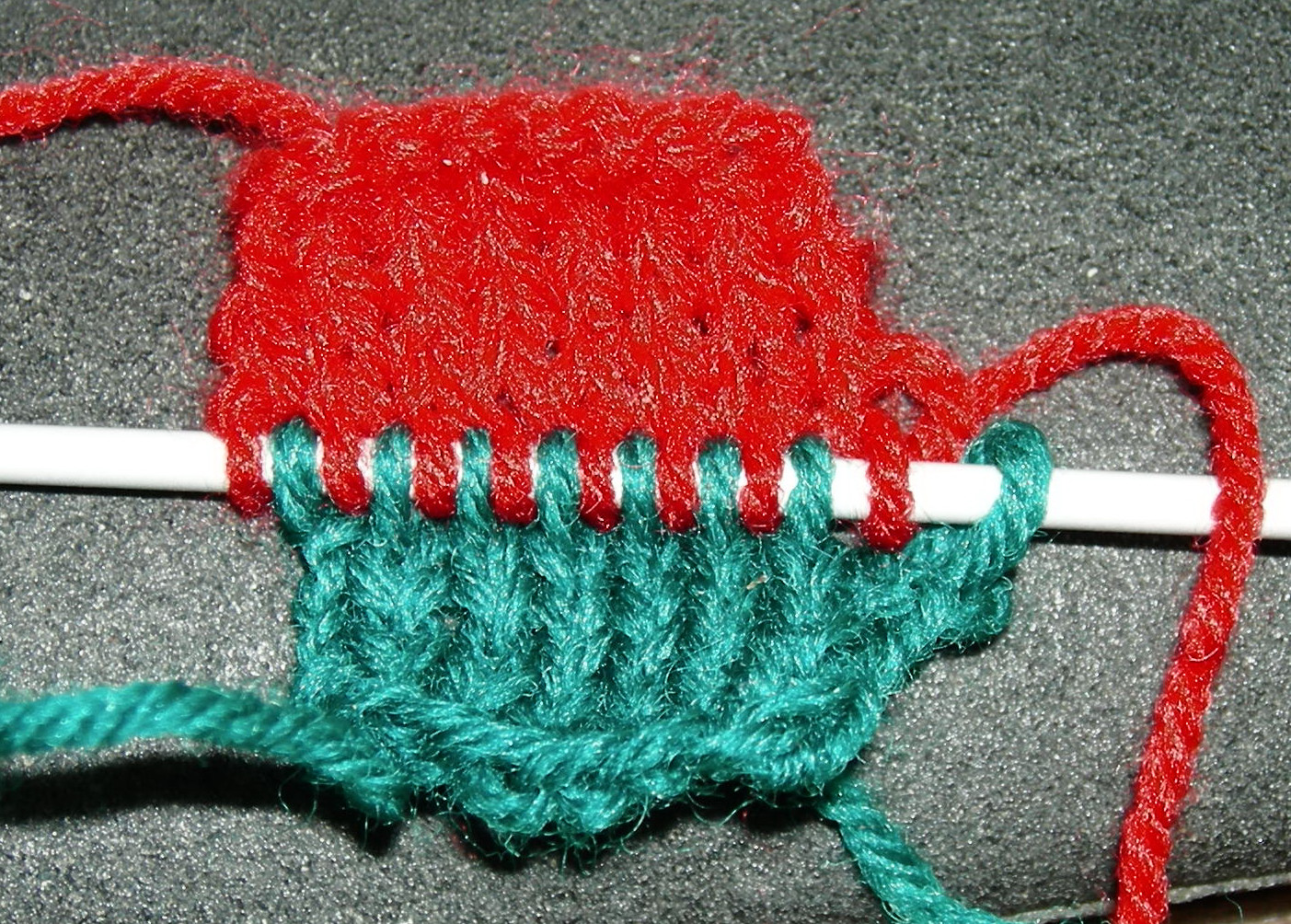
Double knitting.

Double knitting is a form of hand knitting in which two fabrics are knitted simultaneously on one pair of needles. The fabrics may be inseparable, as in interlock knitted fabrics, or they can simply be two unconnected fabrics. In principle, an arbitrary number $n$ of fabrics can be knitted simultaneously on one pair of knitting needles with $n$ yarns, as long as one is careful.

== History ==
A famous example of double knitting is the pair of socks knitted simultaneously on one set of knitting needles by Anna Makarovna, the nanny in Leo Tolstoy's War and Peace:

When the pair was finished, she made a solemn ceremony of pulling one stocking out of the other in the presence of the children.

== Double knit fabric ==
Double knit fabric is a fabric where both sides of the fabric are identical, for example, Interlock and Rib. These fabrics are knitted with two sets of needles on the circular knitting machine that form a material with the same face and back, unlike a single knitted fabric, for instance, a single jersey that has a different appearance on the front and back.

Double knit fabric became popular within 1970s fashion; in the 1988 Grammy Award–winning song "Parents Just Don't Understand", Will Smith comically excoriates his mother for forcing him to wear outdated, 1970s-era "double-knit reversible slacks". However, the double-knit fabric referred to is a machine-made, double-thick construction with some similarities to handmade double knitting (durability, reversibility) but none of the unique colorwork and construction possibilities.

Scuba knit fabric is a lofty double knit fabric, that was designed to mimic neoprene, made from finely spun polyester fibers commonly with 2 way stretch that has a super smooth hand on both sides, low luster sheen and a full-bodied drape. Techno knit fabric is lighter weight and drapier than scuba knit fabric.

== Methods ==
There are several methods for double knitting, including flat knitting on double-pointed knitting needles. After one row has been worked with one yarn, the knitter slides the stitches to the other end of the needle and begins the same row with the next yarn. Only half the stitches are knitted with any one yarn; the rest are slipped. After both passes are done, the knitter then turns the work and begins another row.

Another common method is to alternate a knit stitch of yarn A with a purl stitch of yarn B. Since the yarn is held to the back for a knit, and to the front for a purl, this results in two sheets of stockinette stitches, with the wrong (purl) sides facing each other. Switching colors ties the two sides together for a single, double-thick fabric. This method is often used for elaborate, two-color designs, as there are few constraints on how the colors may be used. The finished item from this method is reversible, each side holding the negative image of the other.
