= Johnny Keon =

Australian rules footballer

Personal information
- Full name: John Bannerman Keon
- Born: 1 October 1885; Geelong, Victoria
- Died: 24 October 1921 (aged 36); Maribyrnong, Victoria

Playing career^{1}
Years	Club	Games (Goals)
1908	Geelong	4 (1)
- ^{1} Playing statistics correct to the end of 1908.

John Bannerman Keon (1 October 1885 – 24 October 1921) was an Australian rules footballer who played with Geelong in the Victorian Football League (VFL). He died young, from an aortic aneurysm in 1921.
