= Kiana (band) =

- Origin: Hyvinkää, Finland
- Genres: Melodic death metal, groove metal, thrash metal
- Years active: 2004–present
- Labels: Symbolic Records
- Members: Antti Kilpi; Jarno Suodenjoki; Felipe Muñóz; Jani Hytönen; Oskari Nyman; Wellu Koskinen

Kiana is a Finnish melodic death metal band from Hyvinkää, Finland.

== History ==
Wellu Koskinen (drums) and Antti Kilpi (guitars) formed the band in 2004; Jarno Suodenjoki (guitars, backing vocals) joined the band later that year. Jani Hytönen (vocals) and Oskari Nyman (bass) completed the group in 2005. They self-released their first demo, Deep Inside, in 2005 with an EP, Reflections, following in 2006. Their debut album, Abstract Entity was released on Symbolic Records on 1 September 2009.

== Discography ==
Demos and EPs

- Deep Inside (Demo, 2005)
- Reflections (EP, 2006)

Studio albums

- Abstract Entity (2009)

== Members ==
- Antti Kilpi - guitars
- Jarno Suodenjoki - guitars, backing vocals
- Felipe Muñóz - keyboards
- Jani Hytönen - vocals
- Oskari Nyman - bass
- Wellu Koskinen - drums
