= Flat knitting =

Knitting technique

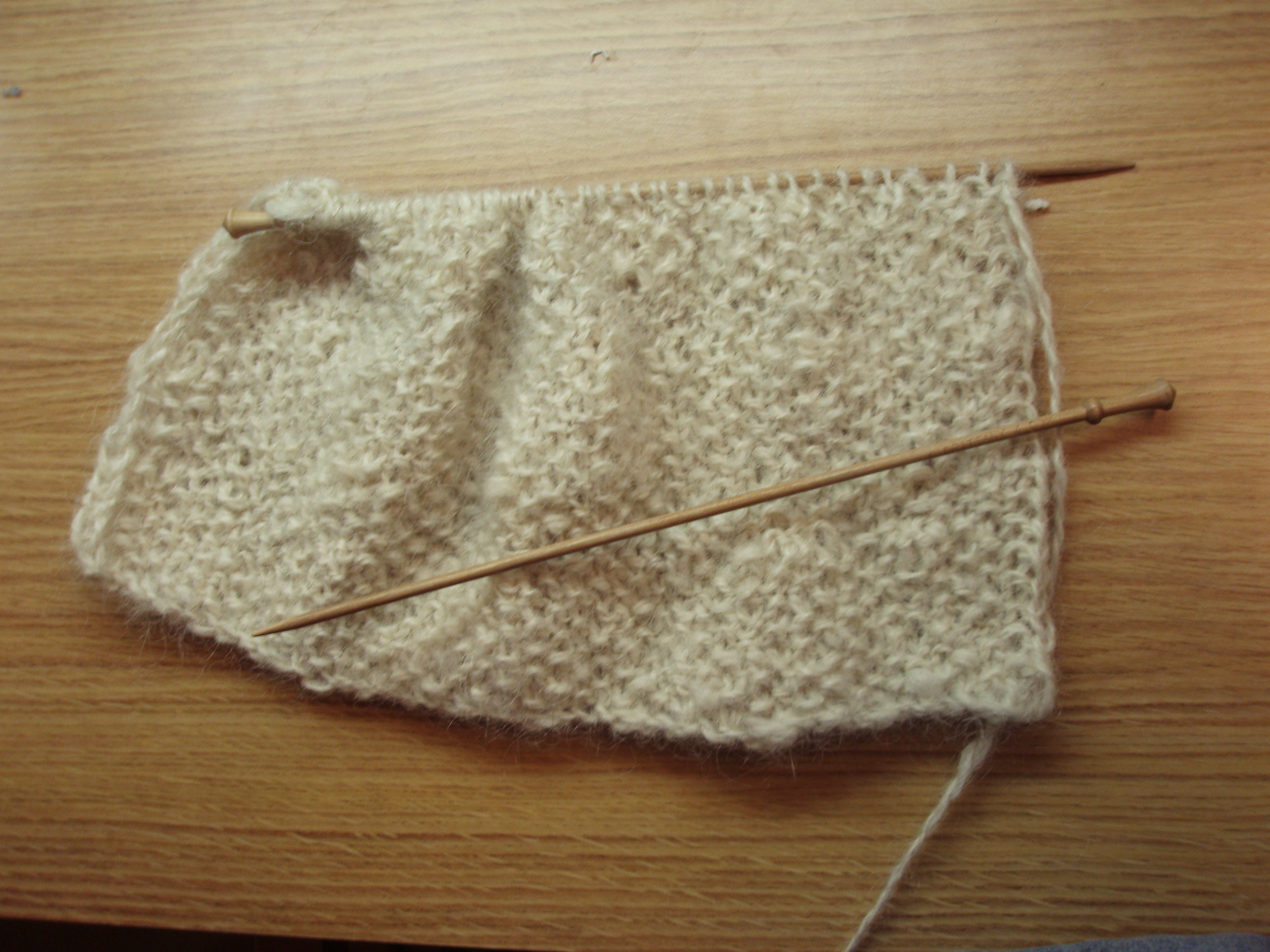
A scarf knitted using flat knitting on single-pointed needles

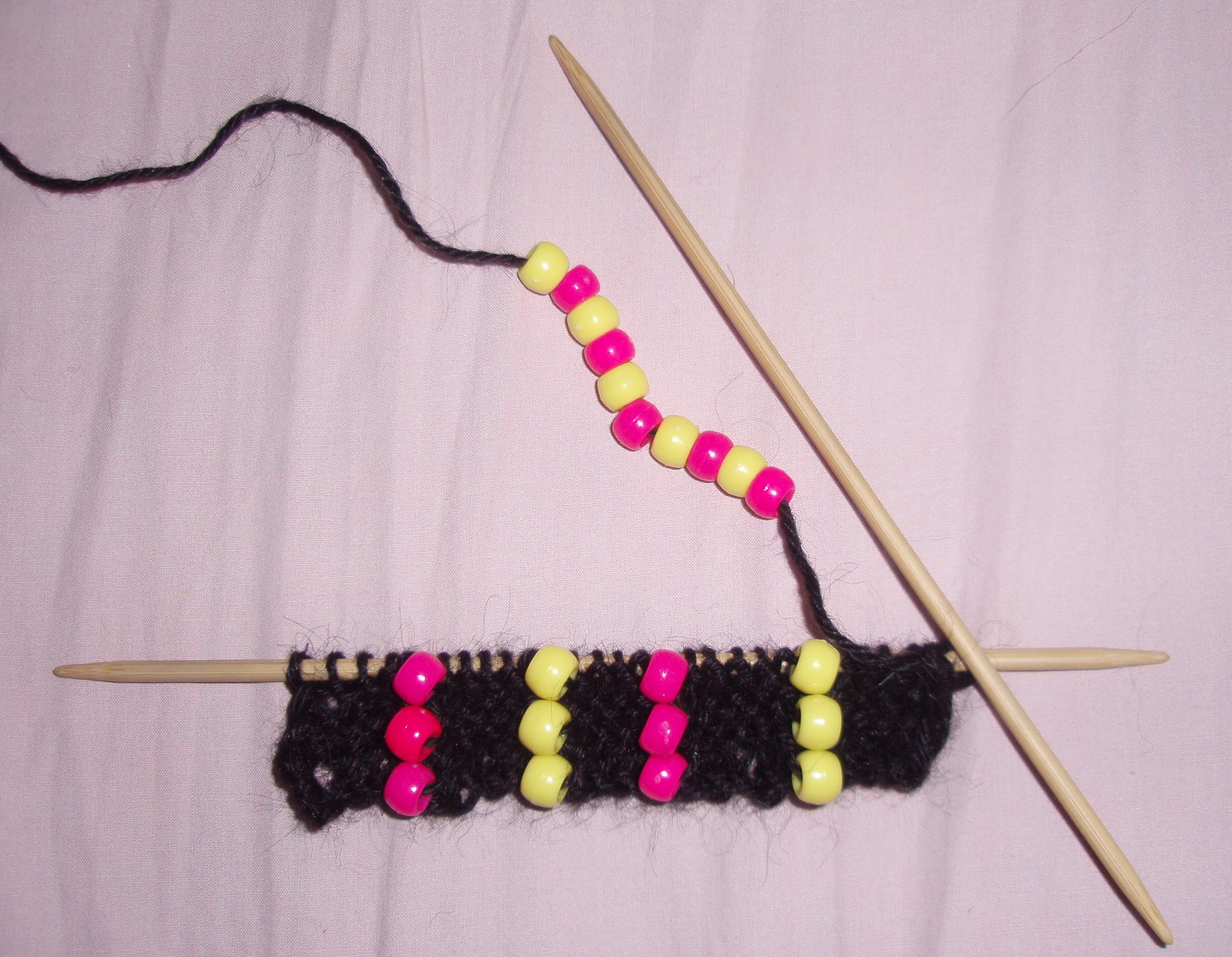
Flat knitting on double-pointed needles

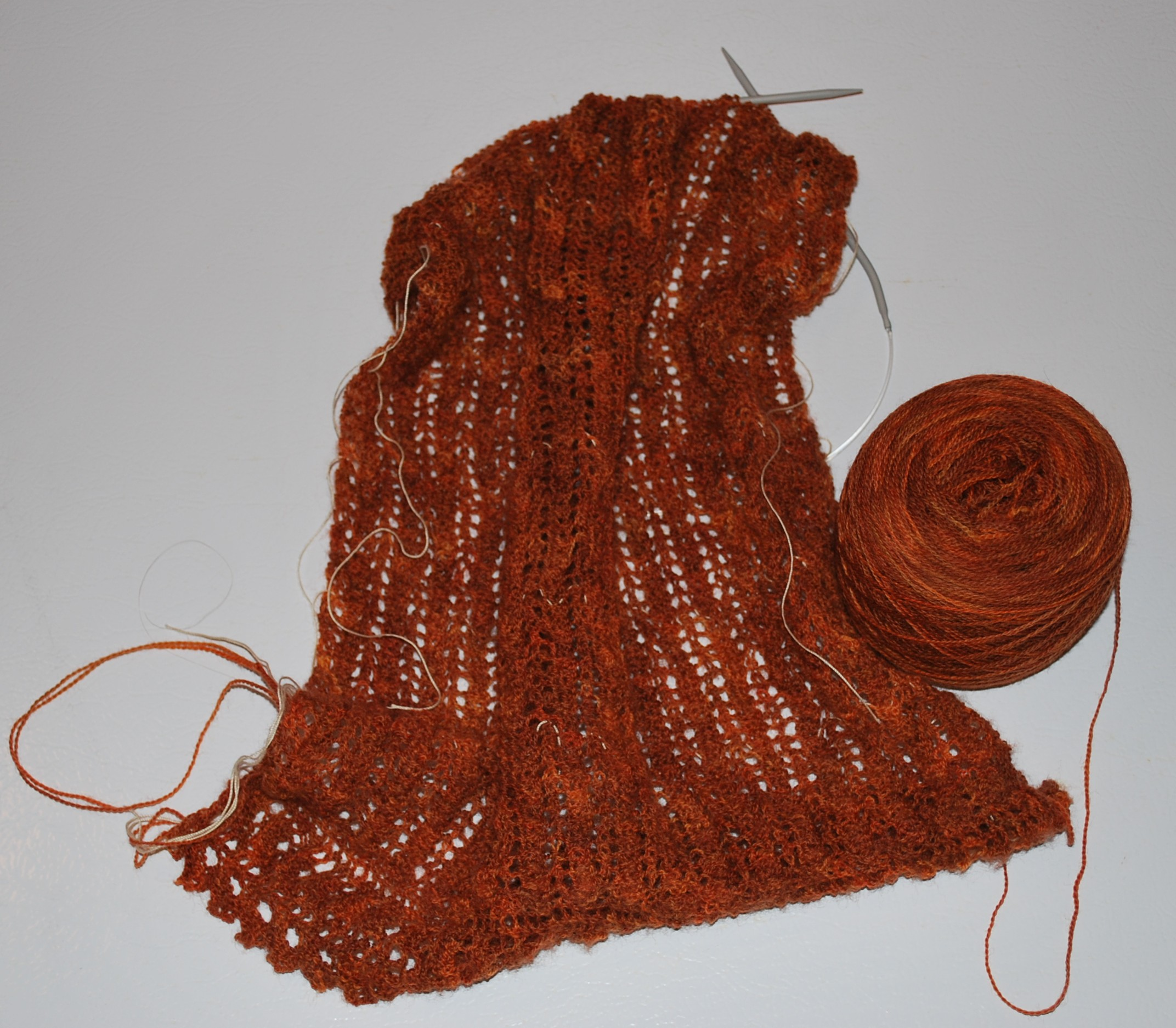
Flat knitting on a circular needle

Flat knitting is a method for producing knitted fabrics in which the work is turned periodically; that is, the fabric is worked with alternating sides facing the knitter. Another method of achieving the same result is to knit alternately from right to left and left to right without turning; this back-and-forth technique requires either innate or learned ambidextrous motor skills. The two sides (or "faces") of the fabric are usually designated as the right side (the side that faces outwards, towards the viewer and away from the wearer's body) and the wrong side (the side that faces inwards, away from the viewer and towards the wearer's body).

Flat knitting is usually contrasted with circular knitting, in which the fabric is always knitted from the same side. Flat knitting can complicate knitting somewhat compared with circular knitting, since the same stitch (as seen from the right side) is produced by two different movements when knitted from the right and wrong sides. Thus, a knit stitch (as seen from the right side) may be produced by a knit stitch on the right side, or by a purl stitch on the wrong side. This may cause the gauge of the knitting to vary in alternating rows of stockinette fabrics; however, this effect is usually not noticeable, and may be eliminated with practice (the usual way) or by using needles of two different sizes (an unusual and less effective way).

In flat knitting, the fabric is usually turned after every row. However, in some versions of double knitting with two yarns and double-pointed knitting needles, the fabric may turned after every second row.

Flat knitting can be worked by hand as described above, or made on a single-bed knitting machine, but it can also be produced on a double-bed knitting machine using only one bed.

In Industrial Knitting applications, the terms "Flat" and "Circular" have very different meanings from those given above. A "Flat" or Vee Bed knitting machine consists of two flat needle beds arranged in an upside-down "V" formation. These needle beds can be up to 2.5 metres (8 ft 2 in) wide. A carriage, also known as a Cambox or Head, moves backwards and forwards across these needle beds, working the needles to selectively, knit, tuck or transfer stitches. A flat-knitting machine is very flexible, allowing complex stitch designs, shaped knitting and precise width adjustment. It is, however, relatively slow when compared with a circular machine. A knitting speed of up to 0.5 metres per second (1.6 ft/s) or slower is considered "low speed" in flat knitting which is generally seen in hand-flat machines. The two largest manufacturers of industrial flat-knitting machines are Stoll of Germany, and Shima Seiki of Japan. The industrial hand flat-knitting machine is considered to have been invented by work covered by the Isaac Lamb patents.
