= Keone =

Keone may refer to:

- Keone Kapisi (born 1994), Samoan footballer
- Keone Kela (born 1993), American professional baseball pitcher
- Keone Young (born 1947), American actor
