= Kianna =

Kianna is a feminine given name. Notable people with the name include:

- Kianna Alarid (born 1978), American musician
- Kianna Smith (born 1999), American basketball player
- Kim Kianna Dy (born 1995), Filipino volleyball player

== See also ==
- Khanna (name)
- Kiana (given name)
