= Pointelle =

Fabric pattern with eyelets

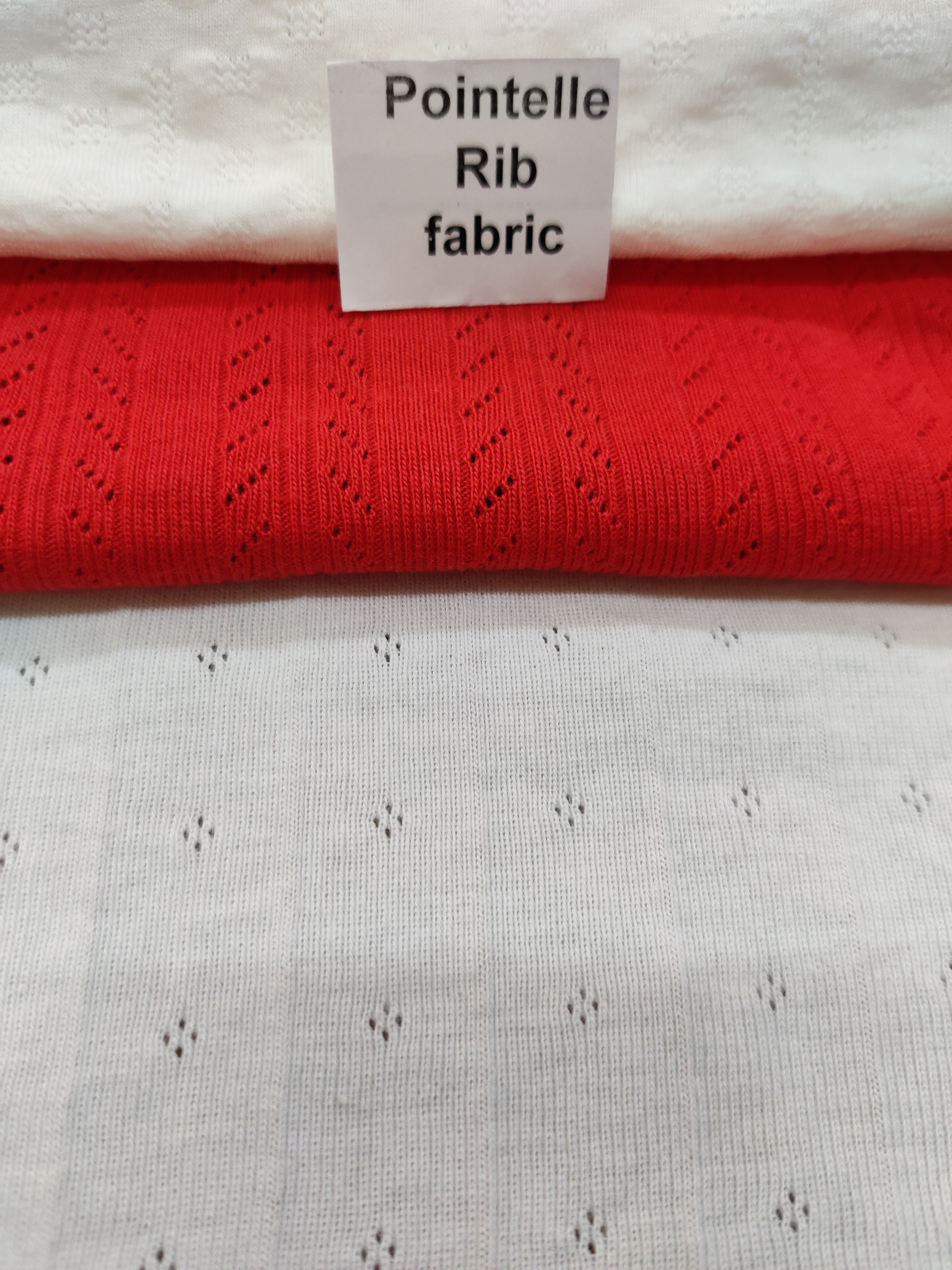
Pointelle fabric

Pointelle is a knit fabric pattern with tiny holes typically in the shape of chevrons; the structure is geometric in shape and with repeated design similar to lace. It is a fine knit pattern with small open spaces, subtle stripe, and floral effects. The fabric is lightweight, airy, and of a very delicate nature.

== Etymology, and origin ==
Origin, 1950s, probably from a point in the sense ‘lace made entirely with a needle’ + the French diminutive suffix -elle.

== Fabric construction ==
Pointelle fabric is an intricate pattern as compared to simple knitting structures like jersey fabric. In pointelle knitting, the yarn does not form a complete loop and create a hole. The pointelle knitting requires jacquard controlled knitting machines. The jacquard machines equipped with computers, wheels, punching cards, etc., allow the knitter more adjustments of yarn feeding, knitting, and tucking positions. These settings help in producing required motifs and complex design and pattern making. The size of the pointelle holes is adjustable to an extent with needle selection on the machine. The resultant fabric is a lightweight, delicate fabric, stretchable and comfortable to wear. In knitting, the transfer knit is used to create the design. It is possible with the jersey and rib structures.

== Uses ==
It is used predominantly in clothing manufacturing. Due to its appearance and fabric characteristics, it is suitable for men's and children's wear as well as feminine dresses. The fabric is used for cardigans, tops, T-shirts, pajamas, night suits, bags, and lingerie.
