= Amirhossein Pourjafar =

Iranian convicted murderer (1999–2018)

- Born: 17 December 1999
- Died: 4 January 2018 (aged 18); Gohardasht Prison, near Tehran, Iran
- Status: Executed by hanging
- Criminal charges: Capital murder
- Penalty: Death (September 2016)

Details
- Victims: Setayesh Ghoreyshi, 7
- Date: 10 April 2016

Amirhossein Pourjafar (also stylised as Amir Hossein Pourjafar, 17 December 1999 – 4 January 2018) was an Iranian juvenile offender who was executed for the 2016 rape and murder of Setayesh Ghoreyshi, a 7-year-old girl from Iran's Afghan community. Pourjafar was 16 years old at the time of the murder and was executed shortly after his 18th birthday. Pourjafar's execution sparked international outrage and renewed questions about the ethics of the death penalty.

== Murder of Setayesh Qorayshi ==
Setayesh Qorayshi (Persian: ستایش قریشی) was a 6-year-old Afghan girl who was raped and then killed by Amirhossein Pourjafar, an Iranian 16-year-old boy, in 2016. This incident has raised widespread media attention in both Iran and Afghanistan. Many users on social networks, either Iranian or Afghan, condemned the incident and expressed their sympathy with Setayesh's family.

After an unsuccessful attempt to burn the corpse in a bathtub full of acid, Pourjafar then called his friend and asked him to help him in fading the corpse. His friend, however, did not help the killer and instead, he informed his own father. His father in turn, called police and then the police arrested Pourjafar.

== Legal proceedings ==
In September 2016, Branch 7 of Criminal Court No. 1 in Tehran handed Pourjafar two death sentences, one for murder in accordance with the Sharia legal principle of qisas and another for rape. He was also sentenced to 74 lashes for mutilating Ghoreyshi's corpse by placing it in a bath of acid after her death. The Supreme Court upheld both death sentences in January 2017.

Pourjafar had initially scheduled to be executed on 19 October 2017. Iranian law allows the execution of death row inmates who committed their capital offences as minors, but it does not allow the execution of those inmates before they turn 18. Although Pourjafar would have been 17 years, 10 months and 2 days old on 19 October 2017 according to the Gregorian calendar, the Iranian legal system initially did not stay his execution as he would have been of age according to the Islamic calendar (19 October 2017 was equivalent to the Islamic date of 29 Muharram 1439, at which point Pourjafar would have been 18 years, 4 months and 20 days old, according to the Islamic calendar.) Ultimately, the execution was called off following pressure from the United Nations. Assuming Pourjafar had been executed on this date, he would have been the fifth of six juvenile offenders executed in Iran in 2017.

Pourjafar's execution was rescheduled to Thursday 4 January 2018, less than three weeks after his 18th birthday. Despite mounting criticism of his death sentence, he was hanged as scheduled at the gallows in Gohardasht Prison, Tehran at dawn on 4 January 2018.

== See also ==
- Afghans in Iran
- Kiana of Nishapur
