= Keion =

Keion is a given name. Notable people with the name include:

- Keion Adams (born 1995), American football player
- Keion Brooks Jr. (born 2000), American basketball player
- Keion Carpenter (1977–2016), American football player
- Keion Crossen (born 1996), American football player
- Keion White (born 1999), American football player

== See also ==
- Keon, given name
- K-On!, Japanese manga and anime series
