= Qiana =

Silky nylon fabric developed by DuPont and heavily marketed in the 1970s

Qiana (/kiˈɑːnə/ kee-AH-nə) is a silky nylon fiber developed in 1962 at the DuPont Experimental Station by Stanley Brooke Speck. The fiber was named Qiana when introduced by DuPont in 1968. Initially intended for high-end fashions, it became a popular material in the 1970s for faux-silk men's shirts, displaying bold patterns. The shirts were generally cut tight and included wide collars to fit over the collars of the double-knit suit coats, which were worn popularly to discos.

Qiana is described in U.S. patent 3249591 as a polyamide fabric having improved resilience and silk-like hand, combined with superior wash-wear performance. The polymer is prepared from 4,4'-diaminodicyclohexylmethane and dodecanedioic acid. DuPont registered "QIANA" as a trademark in 1968. The trademark was not maintained and expired in 1992.

Although the fiber described in the above patent provided "wash and wear" properties because of the chemical composition of the polymer, fabrics from this fiber did not have the aesthetic properties of silk desired in the total Qiana product package. To provide silk-like aesthetics differential shrinkage technology was added to the basic polymer technology wherein half of the fibers in a yarn bundle shrink more than the other half. This technology is described in U.S. Patent # 3,416,302 granted December 17, 1968, to Dr. Robert H. Knospe, assignor to E.I. du Pont de Nemours.
