= Murder of Kiana of Nishapur =

Iranian murder victim (2009–2016)

Kiana of Nishapur
- Born: Kiana Sādāt-Hosseini; 2009; Nishapur, Iran
- Died: 2016 (aged 6–7); Nishapur, Iran
- Cause of death: Homicide
- Known for: Murder victim

Kiana Sādāt-Hosseini renowned as Little Kiana or Kiana of Nishapur also The Seven-year-old Kiana (2009–2016) was an Iranian seven-year-old preschool student from Nishapur. She was kidnapped, raped and murdered by her aunt's husband Mehdi N on September 15, 2016. He was hanged in public 15 days later on September 30, 2016, in Nishapur with a special court order signed by Chief Justice Sadegh Larijani.

== See also ==
- List of kidnappings
- Setayesh Qorayshi
