= Cian (name) =

Cian (Irish: [ˈciənˠ]; Old Irish: Cían) is a Gaelic given name meaning "ancient". Anglicisations of Cian include Kian and Kyan.

== Notable people ==
- Cian Bolger (born 1992), Irish footballer
- Cian Ciaran (born 1976), Welsh musician
- Cian Dillon (born 1988), Irish hurler
- Cian Ducrot (born 1997), singer-songwriter
- Cian Healy (born 1987), Irish rugby union player
- Cian Hughton (born 1989), English-Irish footballer
- Cian Maciejewski (born 1988), Australian soccer player
- Cian McCarthy (born 1989), Irish hurler
- Cian Melia, Irish showjumper
- Cian O'Callaghan, Irish Social Democrats politician
- Cian O'Connor (born 1979), Irish equestrian
- Cian O'Connor (hurler) (born 1983), Irish hurler
- Cian O'Neill, Irish hurling coach
- Cian O'Sullivan, Irish footballer
- Cian Slone (born 2002), American football player
- Cian Ward, Irish footballer

== Historical and mythical figures ==
- Cian, father of Lug Lámfhota
- Cian d'Fhearaibh Bolg, last King of the Senchineoil of Magh Senchineoil, now in County Galway
- Cian mac Máelmuaid, son of Máel Muad mac Brain, who was twice King of Munster
- Saint Cian, sixth-century Welsh saint

== See also ==
- List of Irish-language given names
- Kian (given name)
- Kyan (name)
- Keane (surname)
