= Sarab-e Kian =

Sarab-e Kian سرابكيان
- Village
- Location within Iran
- Coordinates: 33°25′29″N 48°43′11″E
- Country: Iran
- Province: Lorestan
- County: Khorramabad
- Bakhsh: Zagheh
- Rural District: Zagheh

Population (2006)
  - Total: 34
- Time zone: UTC+3:30 (IRST)
  - Summer (DST): UTC+4:30 (IRDT)

Sarab-e Kian (Persian: سرابكيان, also Romanized as Sarāb-e Kīān and Sarāb-e Kayān; also known as Keyān-e ‘Olyā, Khayūn, Kīān-e Bālā, Kīyān Bālā, and Sagwān) is a village in Zagheh Rural District, Zagheh District, Khorramabad County, Lorestan Province, Iran. At the 2006 census, its population was 34, in 4 families.
