= Futura =

Futura may refer to:

== Businesses and organisations ==
- Futura International Airways, a former airline based in Spain
  - Futura Gael, a former Irish subsidiary airline of Futura International Airways
- Tikal Futura, a shopping, business and hotel complex in Guatemala City, Guatemala
- Futura plus, a Serbian wholesale and retail company
- Futura, a defunct British paperback publisher, now part of Little, Brown Book Group.
- Futura, one of the several names of the UFO religion Siderella

== Brands and marques ==
- Gibson Futura, an electric guitar
- Futura (typeface), a typeface designed in 1927 by Paul Renner
- Futura (cooker), a product of Hawkins Cookers Limited
- Royal Futura, a portable typewriter produced from 1958 to 1962
- Futura (clothing), a Dutch clothing brand.

=== Vehicles ===
- Aprilia Futura, a motorcycle
- Lincoln Futura, a Ford concept car
- Ford Futura, a car made by Ford Australia
- Suzuki Futura, a Suzuki Carry commercial vehicle made by Suzuki of Indonesia from 1991 to 2019
- VDL Futura, a model of double decker and single decker coach models manufactured by VDL Bus and Coach

== Film and TV ==
- Rai Futura, an Italian entertainment TV channel
- Futura (TV channel), Brazilian educational channel
- Futura, the name of the Maschinenmensch in the original script of the film Metropolis
- Futura, the home world of the eponymous hero in the television cartoon series Colonel Bleep.

== Music and entertainment ==
- Futura Records, a French record company and Jazz label
- Radio Futura, a Spanish pop rock group
- La Futura, an album by the American rock band ZZ Top
- Futura, an album by Mexican band DLD
- Futura, an album by Bosnian rapper Jala Brat

== Sport ==
- FC Futura, a football club from Finland
- Futura Cup, a hockey trophy of the Ligue Nord-Americaine de Hockey, Quebec

== Other uses ==
- Futura (graffiti artist) (formerly known as Futura 2000), a graffiti artist
- Futura (magazine), published in Croatia 1992–2007
- Salix futura, a species of willow native to Japan

== See also ==
- Diva Futura, an Italian pornography and erotica film studio
- Diva Futura (album), an album by the Greek metal band Nightfall
- Futura Free, a song by American alternative R&B singer Frank Ocean
