= Royal Typewriter Company Building =

- U.S. National Register of Historic Places
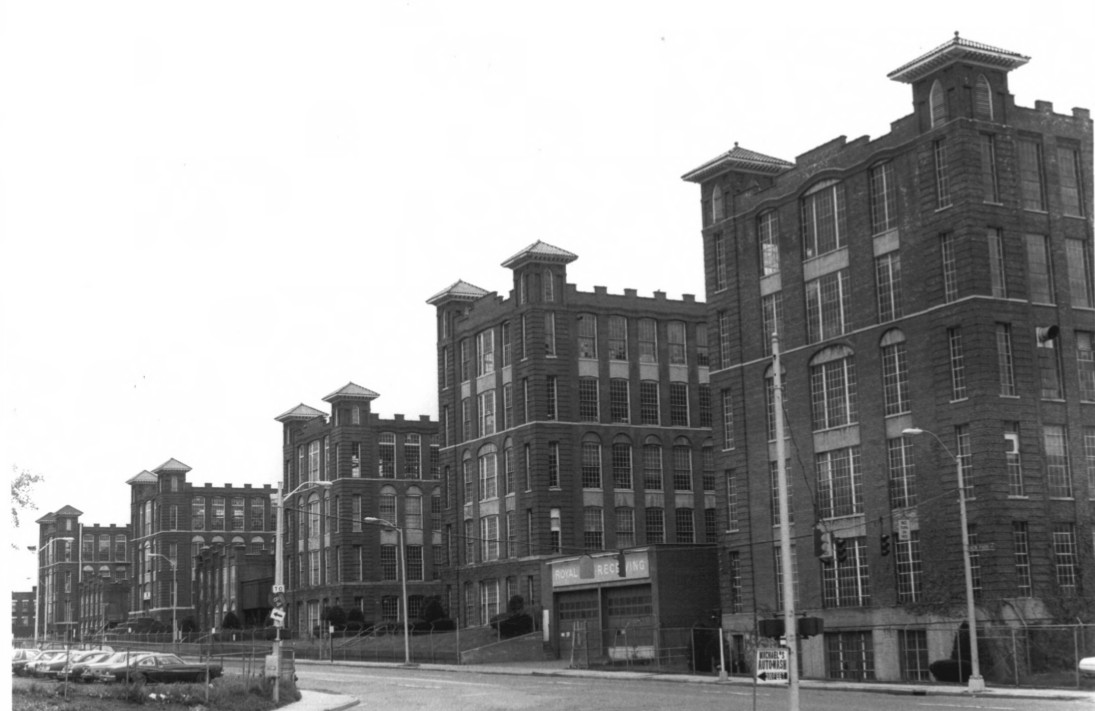
- 1981 photo

- Location within Connecticut Location within the United States
- Location: 150 New Park Avenue, Hartford, Connecticut
- Coordinates: 41°45′7″N 72°42′35″W
- Area: 7.5 acres (3.0 ha)
- Built: 1907
- Built by: Hibbard, B.H., Co.; O'Brien, Dennis, & Sons
- NRHP reference No.: 84003898
- Added to NRHP: February 23, 1989

The Royal Typewriter Company building was located at 150 New Park Avenue in the Parkville neighborhood of Hartford, Connecticut. Built in 1907, it was the principal manufacturing facility of the Royal Typewriter Company, a major local employer, until 1972. Most of the building was destroyed by fire in 1992; the remainder was subsequently razed and the site now houses a shopping center, where a commemorative plaque is located. The building, which was one of the city's largest examples of late 19th-century mill construction, was listed on the National Register of Historic Places in 1989.

== Description and history ==
The site of the Royal Typewriter factory was on the east side of New Park Avenue, roughly between Kane Street and Francis Avenue. It consisted of a long axis running parallel to the road, from which seven broad pavilions projected toward the road. Despite its 20th-century construction dates, the building was built using 19th-century mill construction methods, including load-bearing brick walls. Stylistically the building was an eclectic mix of Victorian elements, including Gothic crenellations and elaborately decorated towers.

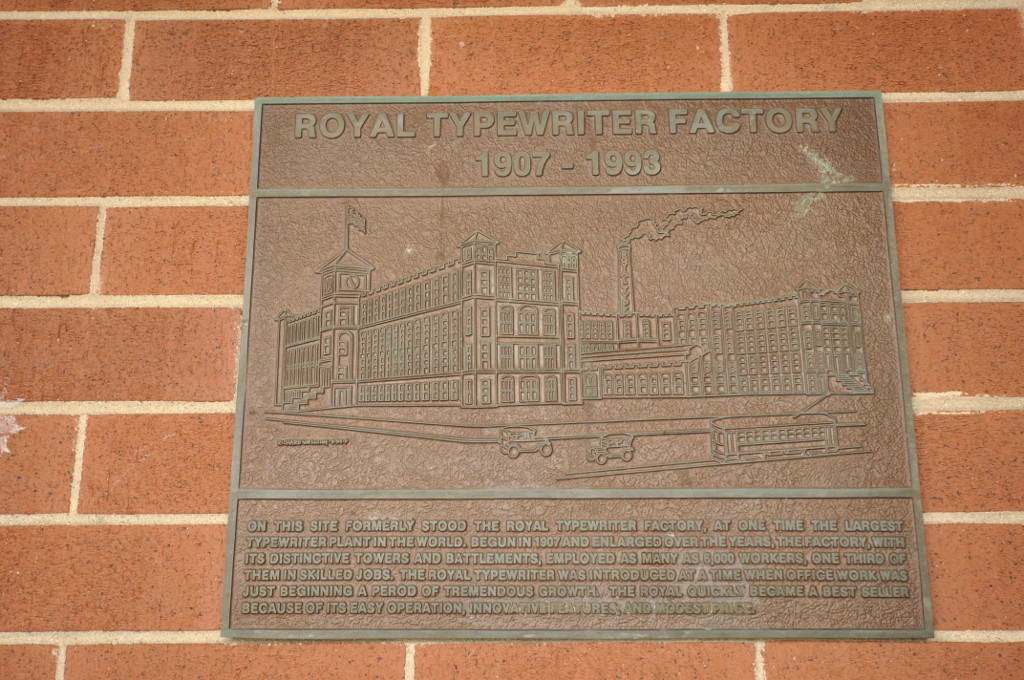
Commemorative plaque at the site

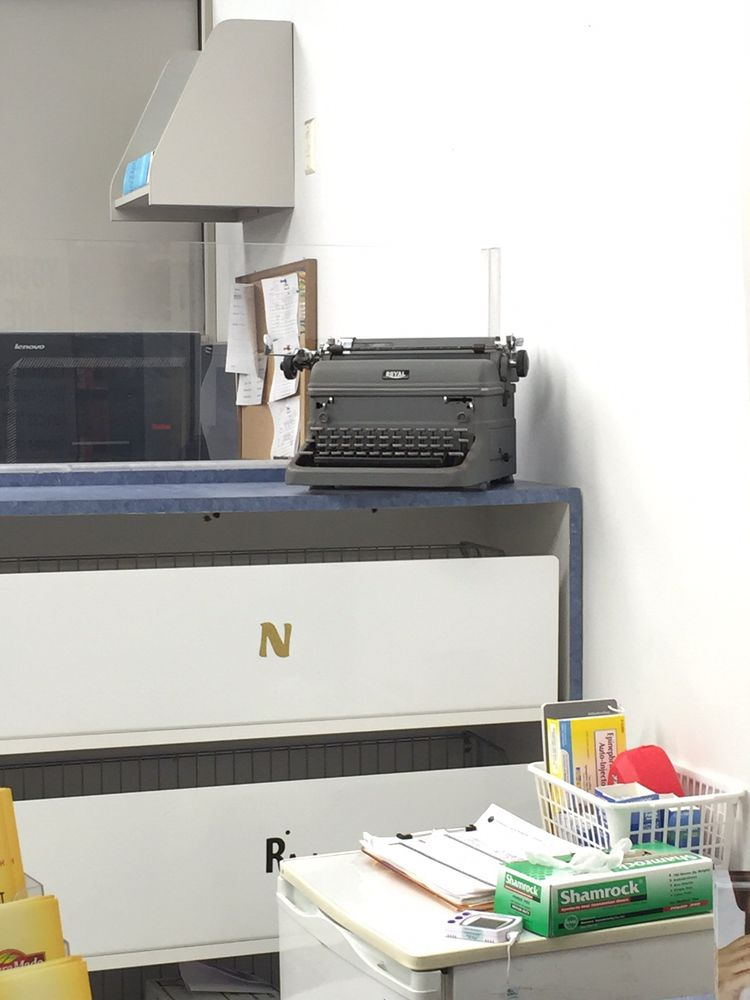
A Royal typewriter on display at the pharmacy of the Stop & Shop that now sits on the factory's site.

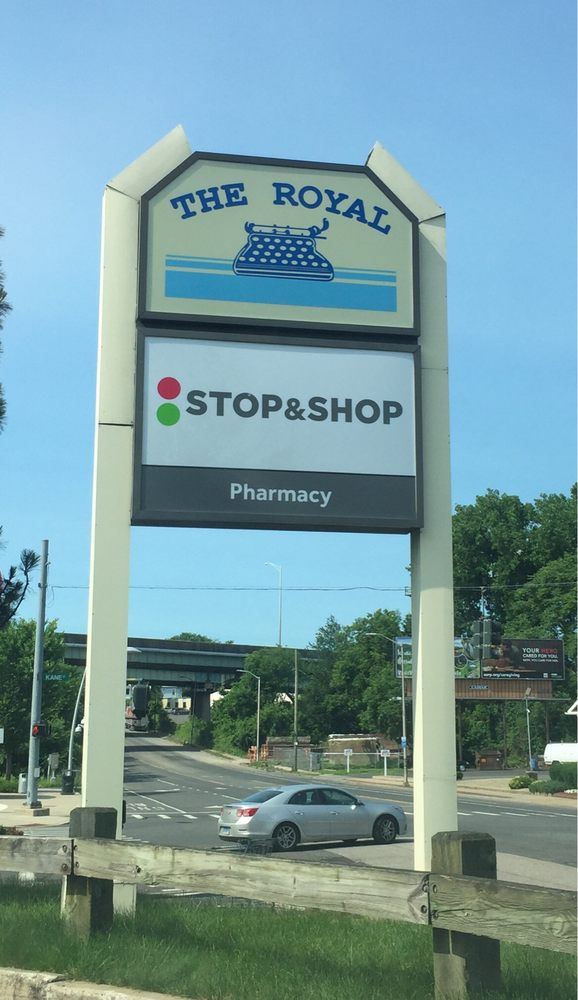
A sign honoring the company.

The oldest portion of the building, its northeastern end, was built in 1907, and the structure gradually grew, achieving its largest size around 1947. At its height, it was the centerpiece of Hartford's leading role in the global production of typewriters, along with the competing Underwood Typewriter Company. Royal Typewriter was founded in Brooklyn, New York in 1906, but rapidly outgrew a small facility there. Charles Cook acquired a controlling interest in the company, and was instrumental in the relocation of its manufacturing operations to Hartford in 1909. After a series of corporate mergers, the Hartford production facility was closed down in 1972.

Various efforts to adapt the complex to other uses failed over the following years, and about two-thirds of the complex was destroyed by fire in 1992. The surviving remnants of the factory were subsequently demolished, and a supermarket was put up in its place.

== See also ==
- National Register of Historic Places listings in Hartford, Connecticut
