= Silver Reed =

Japanese typewriter and knitting machine manufacturing company

Silver Seiko Ltd.
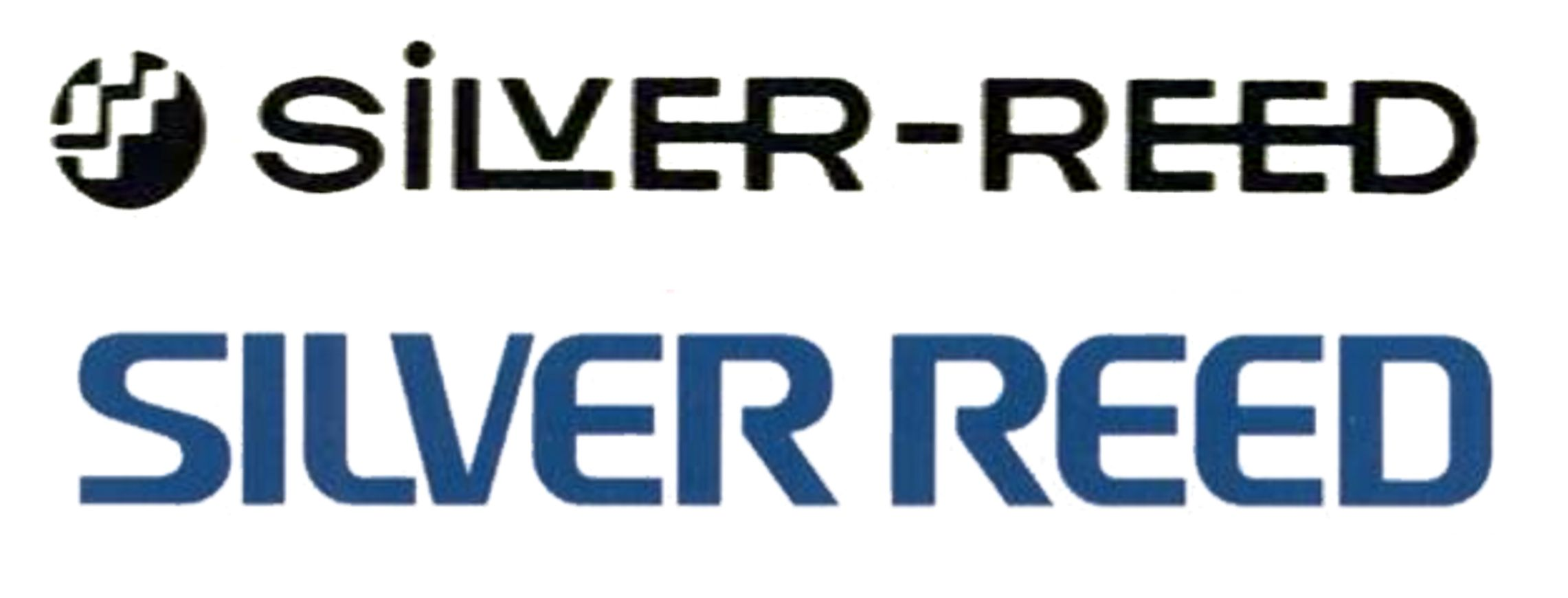
- Early and later Silver Reed logos
- Type: Public (Kabushiki gaisha)
- Traded as: TYO: 6453
- Industry: Knitting machines, manual and electronic typewriters
- Founded: 1952; 74 years ago
- Defunct: 2011; 15 years ago
- Fate: Formal Bankruptcy (2011), assumed by Kashiwazaki US Tech Co., Ltd.
- Headquarters: Kabuki-cho, Shinjuku-ku, Tokyo (early); Shinjuku, Tokyo (later)
- Key people: Hiroshi Kamiya, President; Martin Goldshine EXVP (USA), Thomas B. O'Reilly, EXVP (USA)
- Products: Typewriters, Knitting machines
- Divisions: Silver Reed Ltd. (Jap, HQ); Suzhou Silver Reed Ltd.; Silver Reed (UK) Ltd.; Silver Reed America Inc.; Silver Reed (Swtz) AG; Silver Reed Int (Ger) GMBH; Silver Reed Int (HK) Ltd.; Silver Reed (Aus) PTY.
- Website: www.silver-reed.com, www.silver-reed.co.jp (defunct)

Silver Seiko Ltd., trading internationally as Silver Reed, was a Japanese company founded in 1952, widely known for its knitting machines and typewriters. The company, last formally headquartered in Shinjuku, Tokyo until its 2011 demise, is unrelated to the Seiko Group (timepiece technology).

== History ==
In response to a demand for affordable domestic textile equipment following the second world war in Japan, the company was initially formed as Marukoshi Knitting Machines Ltd in 1952. It changed its name to Silver Knitting Machine Manufacturing, Ltd in 1955 when it started to sell knitting machines to the Western market. In 1966, the company became more widely known as Silver Seiko Ltd, selling its products under the Silver Reed brand name.

When they changed their name in 1966, the company began manufacturing a line of personal manual typewriters , working with the leading industrial design firm, GK-Design Group and entering competition with Japan's two other major typewriter manufacturers, Brother and Nakajima.

With the advent of the digital revolution, the market for the company's core products shrank markedly. Sales peaked at approximately 35.7 billion yen ($1.3B, 2023) in the fiscal year ending March 1985, and declined annually until Silver Seiko declared bankruptcy in 2011 — with approximately 300 employees and 58 independent contractors (as of March 31, 2010). Silver Seiko was ultimately taken over by Lead Technos Co., Ltd. and Kashiwazaki US Tech Co., Ltd., newly established through a company split in 2011.

== Knitting Machines ==
Silver Reed knitting machines have been sold under the brand name KnitMaster Empisal and Silver Reed in the United Kingdom, as KnitMaster and Singer in Australia, as Studio and Singer in Canada, and as Singer in the United States.

== Typewriters ==
The company manufactured its personal manual ultra-portable and desktop typewriters, marketing them three ways: under their own Silver Reed label; marketing them as re-branded products for other typewriter companies (e.g., for Litton Industries' Royal brand); and marketing rebranded variants under the private labels of countless mass market retailers.

Silver Seiko typewriters were initially manual models and subsequently electric, electronic and daisy wheel variants. In the late 1970s, the company developed the 235-C (1979) and 255-C (1981). These were direct competitors to the IBM Selectric, an office typewriter that had at the time captured nearly 75% of an $850M market ($3.5B, 2023). The Silver Seiko model used a 'golf ball' head and ribbon interchangeable with the Selectric, but used microprocessors rather than the Selectric's difficult-to-service tilt and rotate tapes. Along with its two 'golf ball' models, the company entered the electronic printer and typewriter market with its EX- series of daisy wheel office (EX-50, 55, 66, 77, 78) and compact (EX-42, 43N, 44) electronic typewriters (1982–1984) — advertising widely, notably with the celebrity endorsement of Martina Navratilova, Sidney Sheldon and Jimmy Breslin

In the 1960s and 1970s, Silver Seiko, along with Japanese companies Brother Industries and Nakajima, were frequent targets of antidumping campaigns in the United States and Europe — for their low-priced manual typewriters. The flood of inexpensive Japanese typewriters inspired Italian manufacturer, Olivetti to design what was intended as a direct competitor, its plastic-bodied Olivetti Valentine.

== Silver Reed Silverette typewriter ==
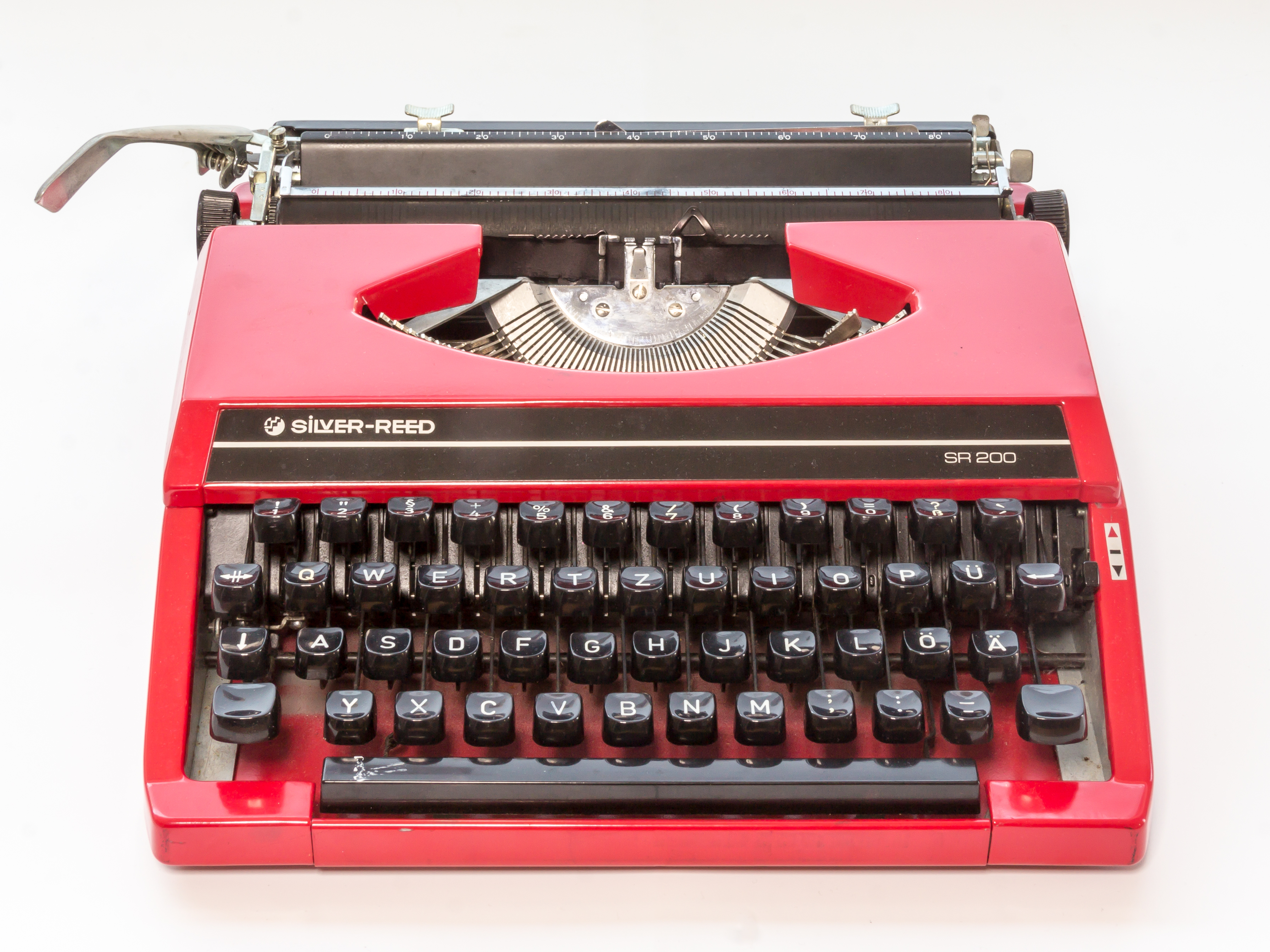
The Silver Reed SR 200 compact manual typewriter with metal body, a Silverette variant

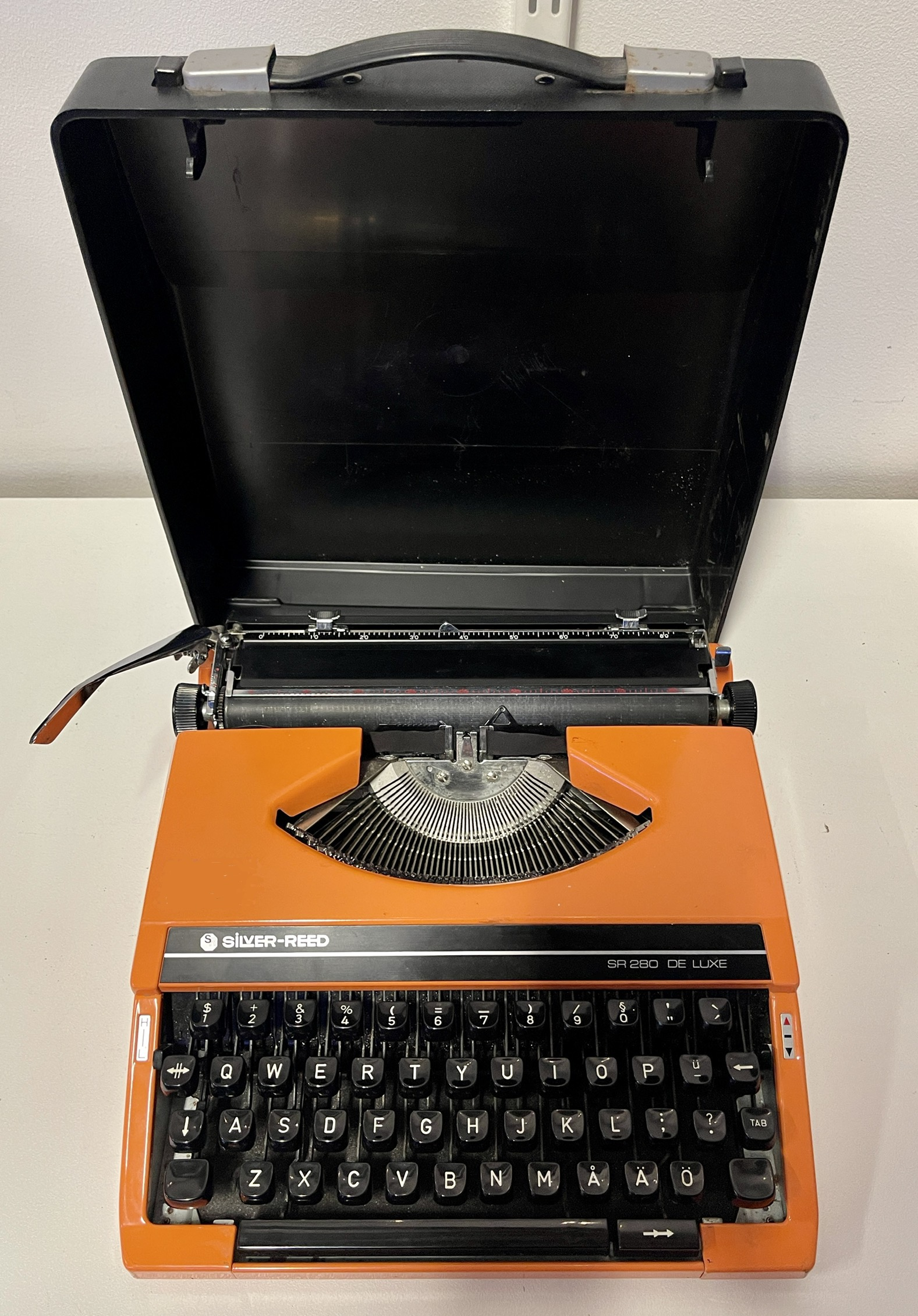
The Silver Reed SR 280 with preset tab function, speed spacer and snap-on top cover/carrying case

Silver Reed Silverette is a prominent entry model of Silver Seiko's line of affordable ultra-portable manual typewriters, weighing about 10 lbs. The company marketed innumerable variations on this same platform with either identical or mostly identical construction and exterior styling — from the early 1960s to early 1970s.

Author Ray Bradbury used a Silver Seiko ultra-portable, as did artist Nick Cave (a Royal Mercury, a prominent rebadged Silverette) and novelist Jonathan Franzen. Noted typewriter authority, Theodore 'Ted' Munk, cited the Royal Mercury variant of the Silverette-type as one of two typewriters he would keep if he could keep only one, citing also the Brother JP-1. Noted typewriter authority and YouTube channeler, Joe Van Cleave, also regularly uses a Silver Seiko-manufactured Royal Mercury.

Most Silverette variations were full-featured, despite their size, offering metal bodywork (including a removable metal bottom plate); 24 cm (9.5") carriage to accommodate standard business-size envelopes, touch-set margins (up-turned chrome), 84 keys, line spacing lever (1, 1 1/2, 2 lines, with integral carriage lock and variable (free) line control), single carriage release lever (right), calibrated paper bail (without rollers), card holders, tilting (aka hinged or rocking) carriage-shift (vs. basket/segment-shift or full carriage-shift), back space key, margin release key (permits typing beyond left or right margin, also acting as a jamb release key), automatic ribbon reverse (using ribbons with eyelets) with ribbon lift link (to maintain proper ribbon tension), paper tension release lever, chrome carriage return arm, shift key at each side, shift lock key, right margin bell — and an ABS plastic "clip-on" lid/cover with built-in carrying handle. The Silverette itself was one of the company's least-equipped models of the line, though it was often marketed in bright, saturated colors.

Silver Seiko offered numerous other variations of its Silverette-type model, with feature additions or deletions per model: 88 keys, paper support, line drawing aperture, paper guide, two-color ribbon settings with stencil setting (ribbon deactivation), two-position touch sensitivity regulator Pica (10 cpi) or Elite (12 cpi) typefaces, five-year manufacturer's parts defect warranty (Royal), #1 or 0 key, pre-set tabulation — or an automatic repeat spacer key, marketed as speed spacer.

The mechanical design is of the "flat" type, with an overall height of roughly 85 mm (3.35"). The keyboard, as distinct from upright desktop designs, had key levers mounted on four dowels held by a dowel plate at front — a configuration commonly seen in other portable or ultra-portable models, including those by Nakajima, Consul of (then) Czechoslovakia and the Olivetti Lettera 32.

The company marketed the Silverette and its variants worldwide:

- under its own Silver Reed model names, including as the: Silverette, Silverette II, 100, SR-100, SR-100 Tabulator, Sovereign Compact 720, SR-180 Deluxe, SR-200, 200 Deluxe, 280 Deluxe, Leader, Leader II, Silver Reed Seventy, 700, 7200, Mastercraft 7200 and Speedwriter 7200, 780 etc.
- prominently and widely as the Royal Mercury and worldwide as numerous other rebadged variants for what had been once-leading, independent typewriter companies, including Royal (as the Signet), Jet, Mariner, Mercury, Century, Companion, Educator, Mustang, Ranger, Signet, and Tab-O-matic (as the Swinger and Sprite with different bodywork), Imperial (Tab-o-matic), Sperry Remington, once Remington Typewriter, inventor of the QWERTY keyboard (as the Idool, Tentwenty, Tenfifty ) and Underwood (as the 255).
- under numerous private label brands for retail outlets with otherwise no specific connection to typewriters, including: the Achiever 600 for Sears, AusRoyal 7200, Imtex S300, Maedi 2000, Eaton 400 (for the Eaton's department store), Wilding TW100/TW200, PT400 for the Boot's chain, Torpedo Student 42, Viscount and Welco S100, Maruzen 200, Savys 200, Addo 602, etc.

== Timeline ==
Company timeline for Marukoshi Knitting Machinery and Silver Seiko:

- October 1952: Marukoshi Knitting Machinery Co., Ltd. founded in Kamitakaido, Suginami-ku, Tokyo
- May 1955: Company name changed to Silver Knitting Machine Manufacturing Co., Ltd.
- January 1964: Silver Knitting Machine Co., Ltd. merged with Silver Knitting Machine Manufacturing Co., Ltd. and Silver Knitting Machine Sales Co., Ltd. and Headquarters relocated to Kodaira City, Tokyo.
- March 1964: Listed on the second section of the Tokyo Stock Exchange.
- June 1967: Company name changed to Silver Seiko Ltd.
- April 1984: Company merged with Silver Office Machine Sales Co., Ltd.
- September 1984: Listed on the First Section of the Tokyo Stock Exchange.
- October 1992: Kodaira factory closed
- June 1993: Head office moved to Shinjuku-ku, Tokyo
- May 27, 2010: Company announces name change to "Nupapa"
- October 1, 2010: The company name change was withdrawn in the IR announced on June 9
- December 28, 2010: Silver Seiko failed to meet its debts for the second time and was declared bankrupt. The Tokyo Stock Exchange designated Silver Seiko shares as stocks for delisting and delisted them on January 29, 2011.
- September 27, 2011: Applied to the Tokyo District Court for application of the Civil Rehabilitation Act, with total debts of approximately 1,2M yen ($8M, 2023).
- December 27, 2011: Decision to abolish rehabilitation proceedings and commence bankruptcy.

By the time of its dissolution, Silver Seiko had diversified to include a range of products including: printer enlargers, shredders, paper folding machines, reduced hydrogen water generators, ozone generators, garbage disposal devices, air cleaners, pitching machines, knitting machines, sewing machines, vacuum cleaners, a simple breast cancer testing device and word processors.

Silver Seiko enjoyed enormous success, especially marketing its manual, metal-bodied ultra-portable typewriters, including a branding arrangement with Litton Industries, under the Royal brand — for example, prominently marketing a badge engineered variant, the Royal Mariner, in the United States and other countries. Litton ended the arrangement in 1974 and turned to Nakajima for its typewriters — and Silver Seiko in turn sold the tooling for its metal-bodied ultra-portable models to Dong-Ah Precisions of Korea.

Silver Seiko's worldwide sales had reached $110M by 1979, when the company manufactured 40,000 typewriters per month. The company formed its Silver Seiko America subsidiary in 1977, headquartered in Torrance, California, with a sales volume of $10 million during its first year and projections of $40 million in sales by 1979 and $100 million by 1981.

Having diversified to electronic printers (e.g., EXP400, EXP500, EXP770 Series) and to electric and electronic typewriters, the company developed subsidiaries worldwide. In 1986, Silver Seiko brought to market a $350 hand-held copier, marketed as "Porta Copy," that could scan and print a 3 1/4" wide, continuous thermal paper scan.
