= Royal Futura =

Portable typewriter (1958 to 1962)

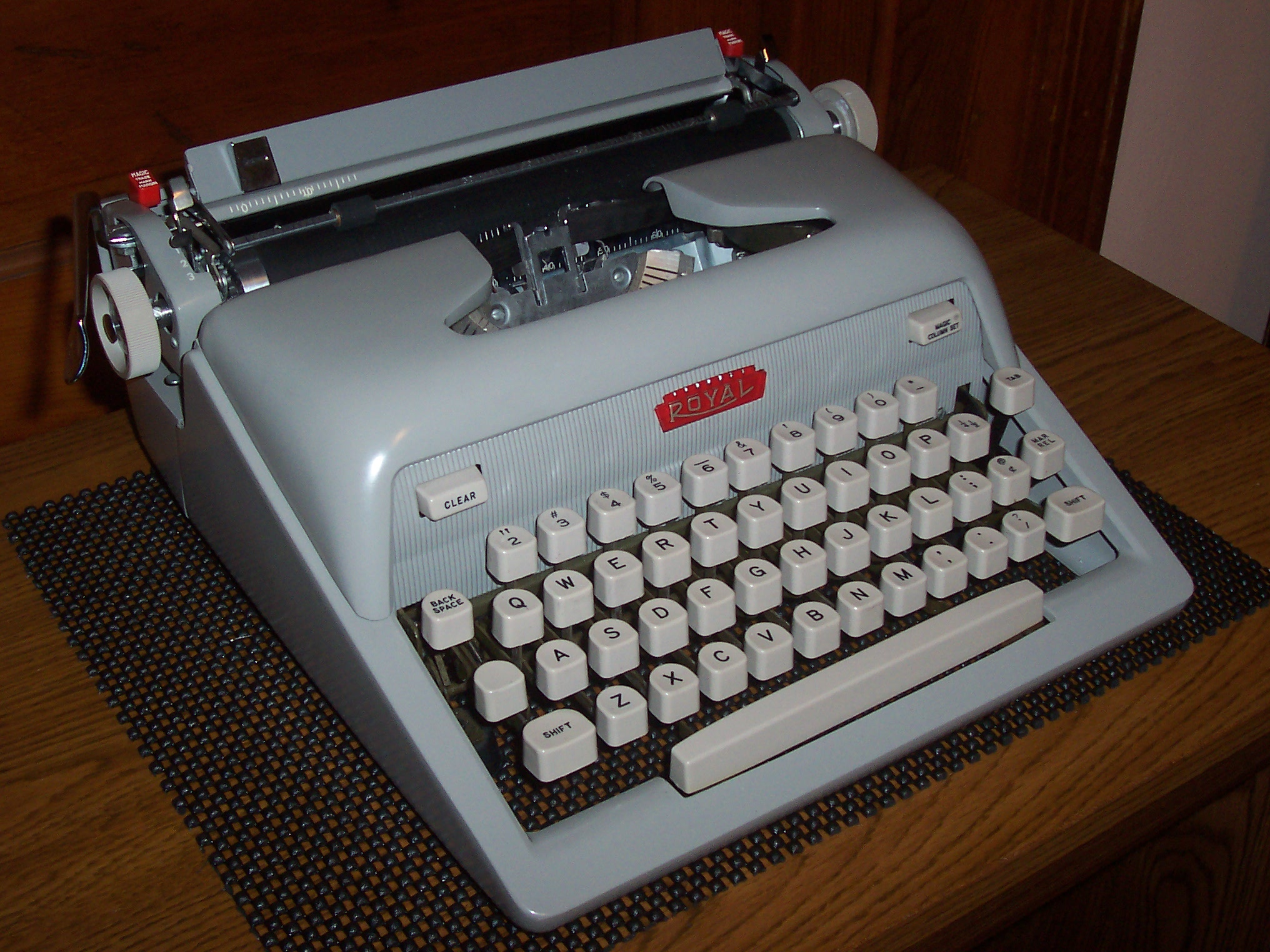
1959 Royal Futura 600

The Royal Futura is a portable, manual typewriter that was produced and sold from 1958 to 1962, by the Royal Typewriter Company division of Royal McBee Corporation. In appearance, features, and pricing, the introduction of the Futura marked a new direction in the production of Royal portable typewriters. Sales were supported by an aggressive print advertising campaign directed at students, and the Futura itself was heavily discounted towards the end of its run. The radical new design eventually found its way onto other Royal models throughout the early and mid-1960s, and the name "Futura" would appear on another model later in decade.

The typewriter was manufactured in both the United States and Canada.

== Design notes ==
The Royal Futura was designed by Laird Fortune Covey. A design patent was applied for in 1957 and granted in 1958. The design differs from previous Royal portable typewriters in several ways. The most obvious difference is its curved and aerodynamic shape, but there were also key construction and materials differences. The Futura had aluminum body panels; this reduced the carrying weight to 22 pounds and provided limited rust protection. In addition to the aluminum body panels, the Futura had a corrugated steel front panel and welded steel internals and frame. The keys were plastic and designed in the recently adopted “Tombstone” style. Two red “Magic Margin” buttons were located on top of the carriage and – on some models – 'tab set' and 'tab clear' keys could be found on the front panel. A plastic red 'Royal' logo also on the front panel doubled as the push-button latch control to open the top of the machine and allow access to the ribbon and internal controls. The Futura had four rubber feet to hold the typewriter in place, an acrylic paper table, and a steel carriage return lever. The standard typeface on all Royal Futura models was "Merit". This typeface was available in Pica (10 characters per inch) and Elite (12 characters per inch). Keyboards were offered in English and French character sets. Other important design features included a 'Carriage Lock Lever' to protect the typewriter during travel by centering and immobilizing the carriage; a 'Ribbon Color Selector' that could be switched from black ribbon to red ribbon to stencil; 'Segment Shift', which allowed for the character basket rather than the carriage to move when the shift key was pressed; and a 'Clear Writing Line' that permitted an unobstructed character view while typing.

== Variations ==
Although most Royal Futura advertising focused on the high-end model – the Futura 800 – there were two other models available. The Futura 400 and 600 were variations that differed in both appearance and functionality:

=== Futura 800 ===
The Royal Futura 800 was the most popular, most feature-full, and most expensive model. It had a 44-key (48 character) keyboard. At the time, this was considered to be a full-keyboard and was more likely to be found on large office typewriters than on portable ones. The 800 also came equipped with a plastic, custom-fitted dust cover and internal felt lining to mute typing noise. Behind the paper table was a retractable V-shaped paper guide that allowed for easy viewing of work in progress. The 800 came in several different two-tone colors: "Periwinkle Blue", "Meadow Green", "Mist Gray", and "Cocoa" (often referred to as Salmon-Pink). A three-tone “Americana” model with red, white, and blue body panels was also offered.

=== Futura 600 ===
The Futura 600 differed from the 800 in several key respects. Most notably, the keyboard had 42 keys (44 characters). This was the more common portable typewriter keyboard configuration and did not include the following characters: "1", "!", "=", and "+". The 600 lacked a retractable paper guide and was available in two monotone colors: Imperial Pearl Gray and Blue. Finally, the Futura 600 came equipped with a different luggage case than the 800 did and did not have its own dust cover.

=== Futura 400 ===
Like the 600, the Futura 400 had a 42-key keyboard. Unlike the 600, there was no “Magic Column Set” and therefore, no way to set automatic tabs. The Futura 400 came in a single monotone color: Mist Gray.

== Luggage case ==
All new Royal Futura models came standard with a luggage case. The Futura 800 case was bound in faux leather and included a Royal-branded luggage tag. The luggage case included with the 400 and 600 models was fiberglass and designed to look like a small tweed suitcase. All Futura cases were durable and included internal latches for securing the typewriter while in transit, and an external lock to prevent unauthorized access. The Futura 800 cases originally came with a leather handle while the 400 and 600 handles were made of plastic. All typewriter cases had durable hard-rubber feet to allow for safe, upright storage.

== New in the box ==
A new Royal Futura came with the following:

- Locking luggage case (and One Key)
- Two foam packing inserts

• Instruction manual (which included a list of Service Centers Nationwide)
• Dust cover and Luggage Tag (800 only)
• One Twin-Pak ribbon

== Highlighted features ==
Because the Futura (especially the 800 model) was designed with several features not found on other portable typewriters, the Royal Typewriter Company was eager to highlight the advantages of these features in its marketing materials.

The following features were most often emphasized:

- Magic Margins: two red buttons found on top of the carriage that were used to set the left and right margins.
- Twin-Pak Ribbon: a proprietary design that facilitated quick and clean ribbon changing.

• Magic Column Set: two buttons to add and remove tabs were located on the front panel of each Royal model 600 and 800 typewriter.
• Personalized Touch Control: this allowed the typewriter key sensitivity (amount of typing force required) to be adjusted to one of ten levels via a lever located under the machine's cover.

In addition to these features, the durability of the Royal Futura was used as a selling point. The “96 Year Test” was a machine stress test performed at an independent laboratory to prove that the Futura was a more durable machine than others in its class.

== Advertising and target market ==
The Royal Futura was frequently advertised in print. Advertisements could be found in the Saturday Evening Post, Popular Photography, Scholastic Voice, and numerous newspapers nationwide. The most prominent campaign ran in Life Magazine from November 1958 until May 1962. Most of this advertising shared some underlying themes. First, the primary market was high school and college students or recent graduates. Second, the advertisements themselves were just as often targeted towards the parents as they were towards the students. Third, several advertisements alleged that owning a Royal typewriter would improve a student's academic performance. In May and June 1961, a $10 student gift certificate was offered to encourage the purchase of a Futura. Both national and local advertisements often played up the Futura's distinctive looks. Phrases such as “New as outer space” and “Years ahead styling and construction” were representative of the taglines used during this time.

== Pricing ==
The cost to purchase a Royal Futura varied by year and location. Advertisements overwhelmingly emphasized pricing for the full-featured model 800 and seldom mentioned the less-equipped models 400 and 600.

The average price of a Royal Futura 800 was roughly $125 (U.S.) in 1960; this is $1000 in 2015 inflation-adjusted dollars (as per the Bureau of Labor statistics Consumer Price Index calculator).

== Notable users ==
Famous users of the Royal Futura include:

- US President Dwight D. Eisenhower
- Writer Marguerite Yourcenar

== In films ==
A period-appropriate periwinkle blue Royal Futura 800 appears in the 2011 movie The Help.

== Legacy ==
Neither the name “Futura” nor its distinctive design was limited to the three portables described above. Including the original Futura models, there are twelve known typewriters that share the Futura body (if not always the same features, keys, or colors). There is one distinct design that shares the Futura name and there are several additional models that share Futura design elements.

- From 1959 to 1962, Royal produced a similar typewriter line for sale exclusively at Montgomery Ward.

Models in this line were the 'Heritage', 'Heritage-Deluxe', and later the 'Heritage III'. In each case, the basic design was the same as the Futura's. Differences included keys that were flatter (similar to the Royal Quiet DeLuxe) and a more muted range of color availability.

- Beginning in 1961, two other Royal typewriters — the "Tab-O-Matic" and the "All-American" — were built to similar specifications as the Futura but without features such as "Magic Margins" or "Touch-Control". A different color scheme was used for these models and they lacked design details such as the corrugated steel front panel and a push-button cover latch. As with the Futura 400 and 600, the "1" and "!" characters were not part of the standard typeface. However, unlike the lower-end Futura's, this typeface did include "+" and "=". Both the Tab-O-Matic and the All-American were sold at a substantially lower price point than was advertised for the Futura.
- Also in 1961, the Royal Aristocrat — a model which had been around since the 1930s — was given a Futura body. It had a blue top, a beige body, and a gold carriage and front plate. Its key configuration was like the Tab-O-Matic's but its key design was like the Quiet Deluxe. It came with a leather case like the Futura 800 but with the plastic handle found on later machines. The redesigned Aristocrat had the "Magic Column Set" but no "Magic Margins". Finally, the "Royal Aristocrat" label was merely a sticker as was found on the Heritage III, and All-American, but not found on the original Futura styles.
- The Royaluxe 400, 425, and 450 were typewriters manufactured in Holland. All three made use of the Futura body (including the corrugated front plate). However, unlike other Futura derivatives, both the touch control and color selector were built into the exterior frame and could be accessed without opening the top of the machine.
- Later in the 1960s (at least in 1968) Royal began to apply the Futura name to an entirely different machine. A gold and white typewriter with a design more like that of the Royal 890 was — for a limited time — sold as the "Futura".

Finally, distinctive elements of the Futura body can be found in several other typewriters. Starting in 1961 and continuing throughout the decade, Futura design appeared in multiple Royal machines produced in Holland. Included were the: Royal Signet, Royal Parade, Royalite and Royalite 120, Royal Crescent, Royal Forward I (produced exclusively for Montgomery Ward), Royal Fiesta, and Royal Eldorado Deluxe. Although these machines were slim, budget portables aimed at a different customer base than the Futura was, their basic design is strongly reminiscent of Covey's original vision.
