= Royal 10 =

Desktop typewriter model

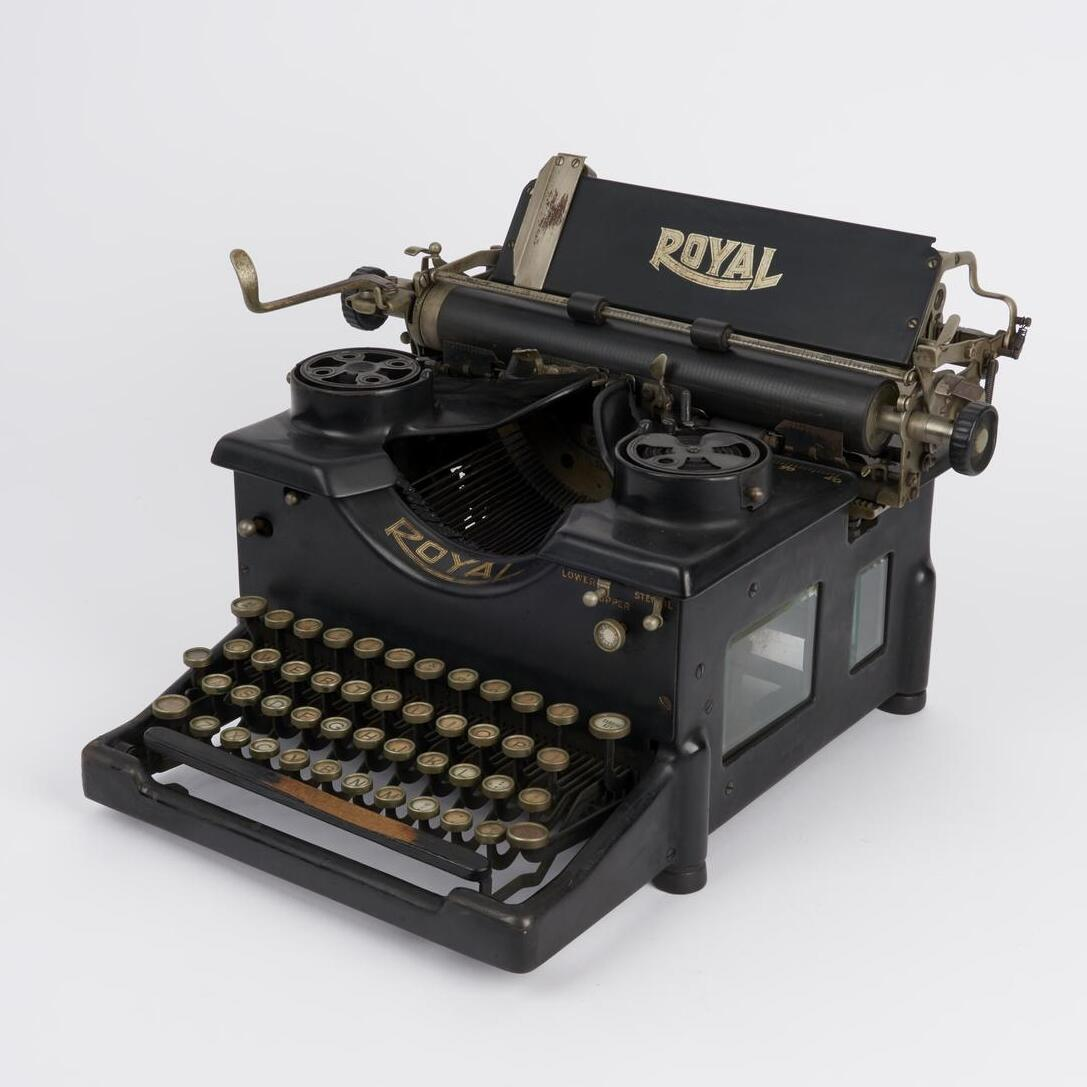
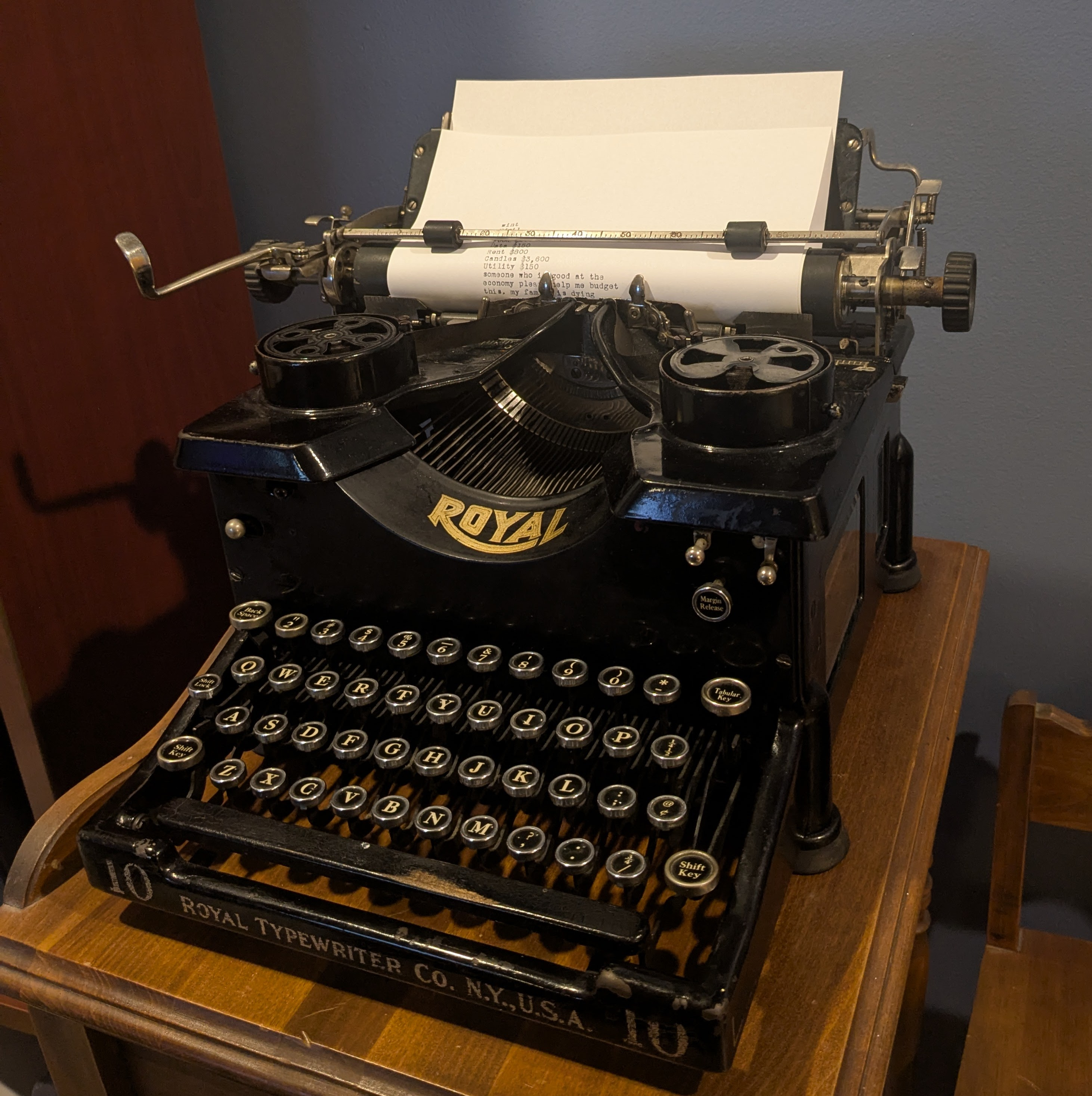
- Royal 10 typewriters
- Classification: Typewriter
- Powered: Mechanical
- Manufacturer: Royal Typewriter Company
- Height: 10 inches (25 cm)
- Width: 15 inches (38 cm)
- Depth: 15 inches (38 cm)

The Royal 10 was a typewriter made by the Royal Typewriter Company from 1914 until 1940.

The Royal 10 was known for its versatility and durability. A popular typewriter, it changed little over its history, with only cosmetic changes to its side panels. From 1915 to 1922, dual glass panes allowed operators to peer inside, while starting in 1923 a single glass pane was used. The Royal 10 sold for $100 ($3,183 in 2025) in 1915. As of 2024, the Royal 10 sold for between $100 and $500 on eBay, depending on the year and condition.

The Royal 10 is ten inches in height, and fifteen inches in width and length. The carriage, moved by ball bearings, did not need oil. Paper up to 11 inches (28 cm) in width was supported. Dual-color ribbon also was supported, as well as stenciling. The most common typeface used was called "Pica".

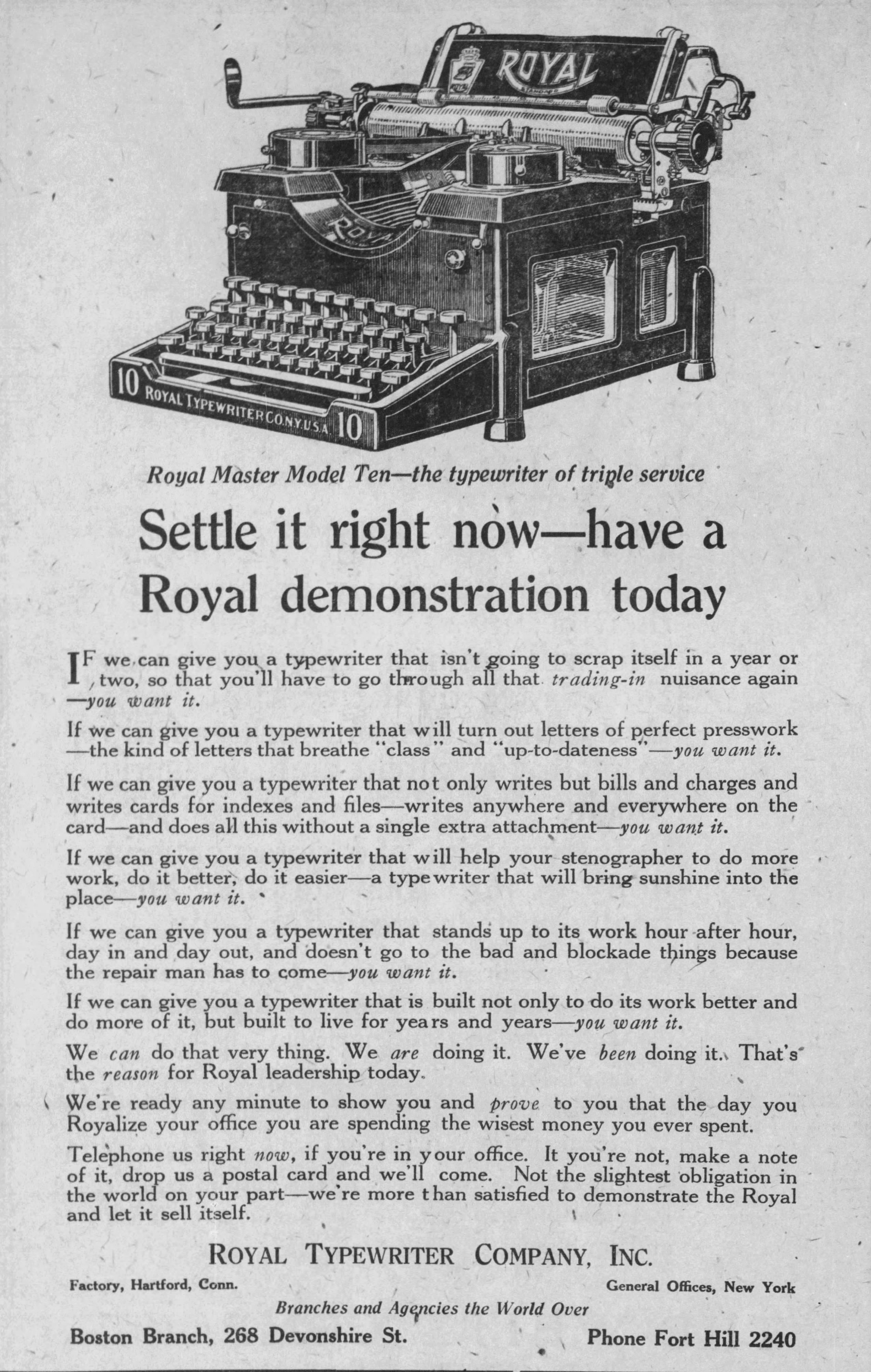
An advertisement for the Royal 10 typewriter in the March 11, 1915, Boston Globe

== In media ==
Rosalind Russell used a Royal 10 in the 1940 film His Girl Friday.

Stephen King's novel Misery features a Royal 10 typewriter given from the character Annie to Paul. The typewriter, originally missing the letter "N" and later losing "T" and "E", and used by Paul to write the draft of his novel Misery's Return, has been called "the novel’s third main character". A Royal 10 also appears in the 1990 film adaptation. For the recreation of the typewriter's font in the book, "Typeka" was chosen as a close match with a slightly used appearance.

A Royal 10 was featured in the music video for Taylor Swift's song "Fortnight", spurring an interest in typewriters among Swifties.
