= Olivetti Valentine =

Italian typewriter introduced in 1969

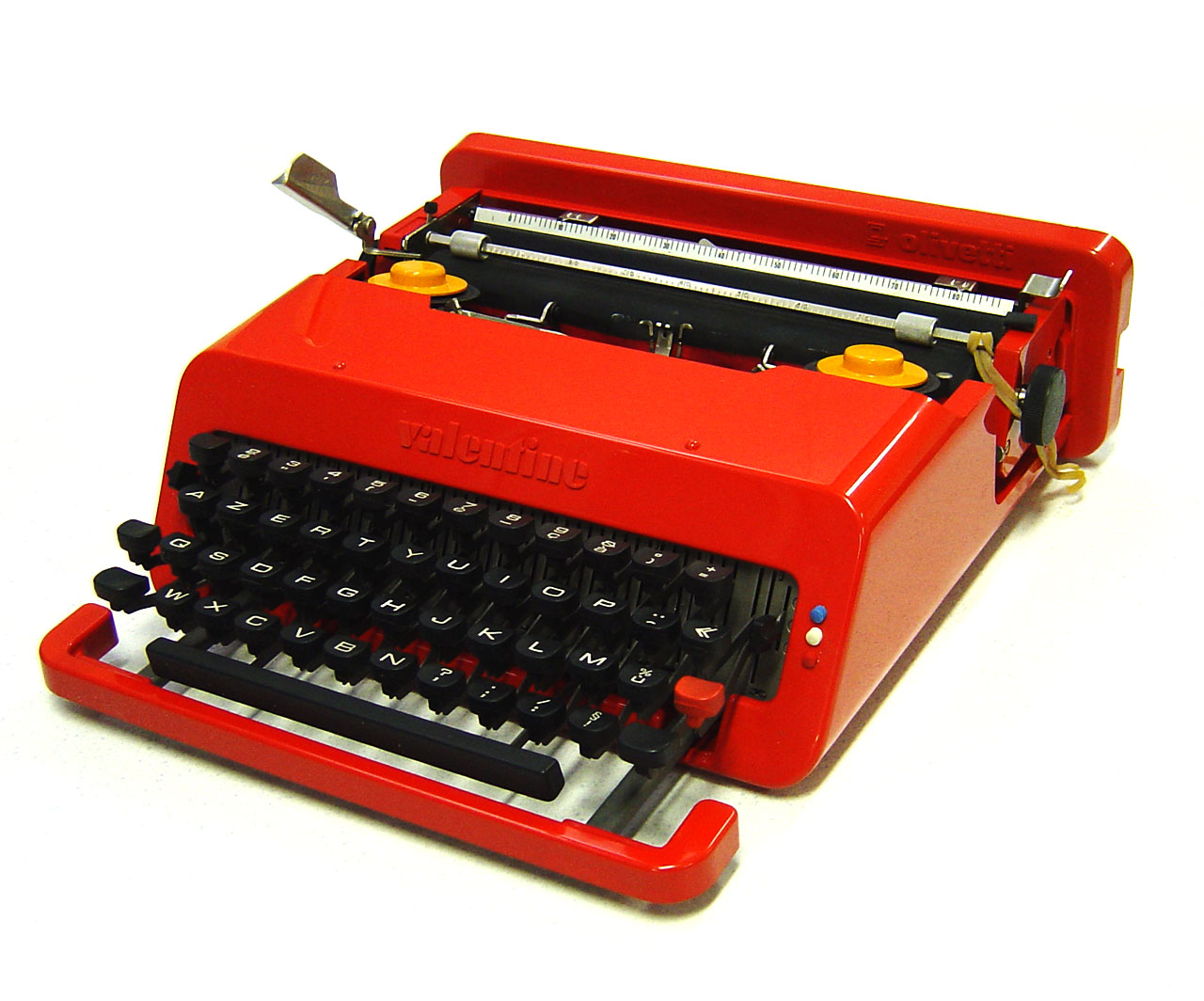
- The Olivetti Valentine designed by Ettore Sottsass (with Perry King and Albert Leclerc)
- Type: Portable typewriter
- Inception: 1969
- Manufacturer: Olivetti S.p.A.
- Last production year: 1975

The Olivetti Valentine is a portable, manual typewriter manufactured and marketed by the Italian company, Olivetti, that combined the company's Lettera 32 internal typewriter mechanicals with signature red, glossy plastic bodywork and matching plastic case. Designed in 1968 by Olivetti's Austrian-born consultant, Ettore Sottsass (father of the Memphis Group), who was assisted by Perry A. King and Albert Leclerc, the typewriter was introduced in 1969 and was one of the earliest and most iconic plastic-bodied typewriters.

Despite being an expensive, functionally limited and somewhat technically mediocre product which failed to find success in the marketplace, the Valentine "subverted the status quo" of typewriter design, captured the zeitgeist of post-'68 counterculture, and ultimately became a celebrated international icon, largely on account of its expressive design.

The Valentine is featured in the permanent collections of the Metropolitan Museum of Art, Museum of Modern Art, and Cooper Hewitt, Smithsonian Design Museum in New York; London's Design Museum and Victoria and Albert Museum; the Powerhouse Museum in Sydney; as well as the Triennale di Milano in Milan.

Poet Giovanni Giudici, who was employed with Olivetti, described the Valentine as "a Lettera 32 disguised as a sixties girl." Over time, Sottsass himself – who thought of the Valentine as the Bic Biro/Cristal of typewriters, his oggetto rosso 'red object' – would tire of its design, calling it "too obvious, a bit like a girl wearing a very short skirt and too much make-up."

== Design and development ==
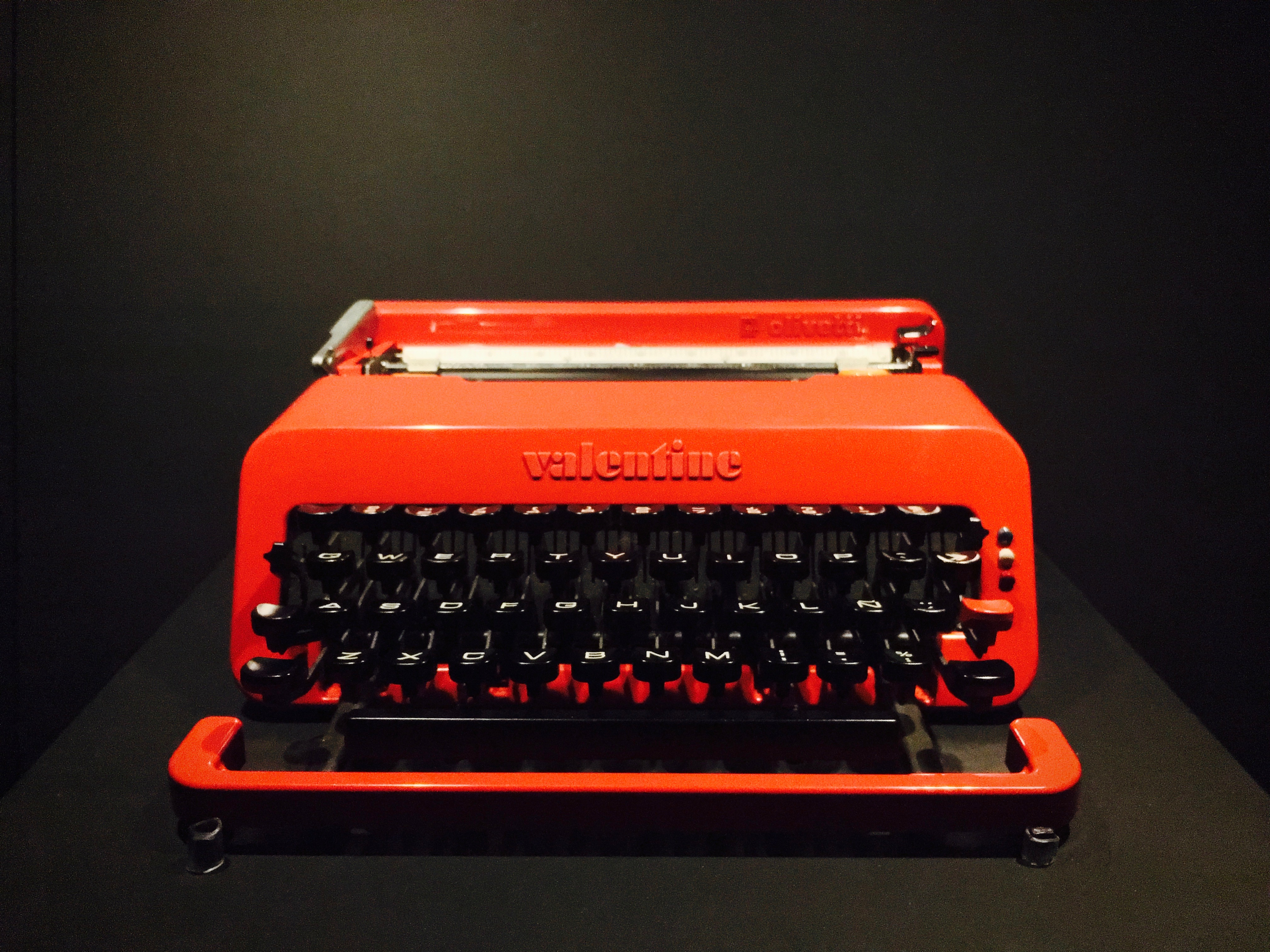
Olivetti Valentine (front view)

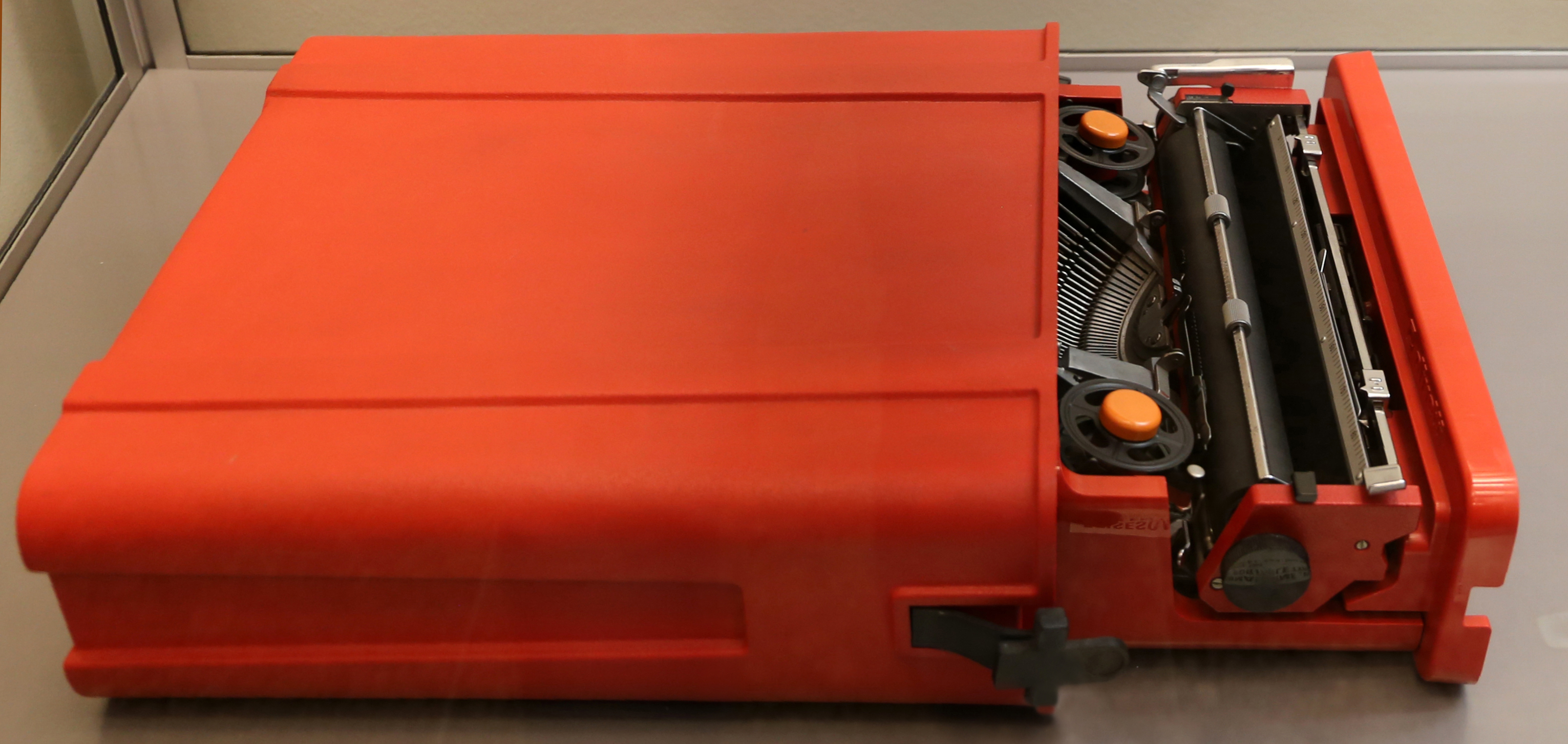
Olivetti Valentine (with case)

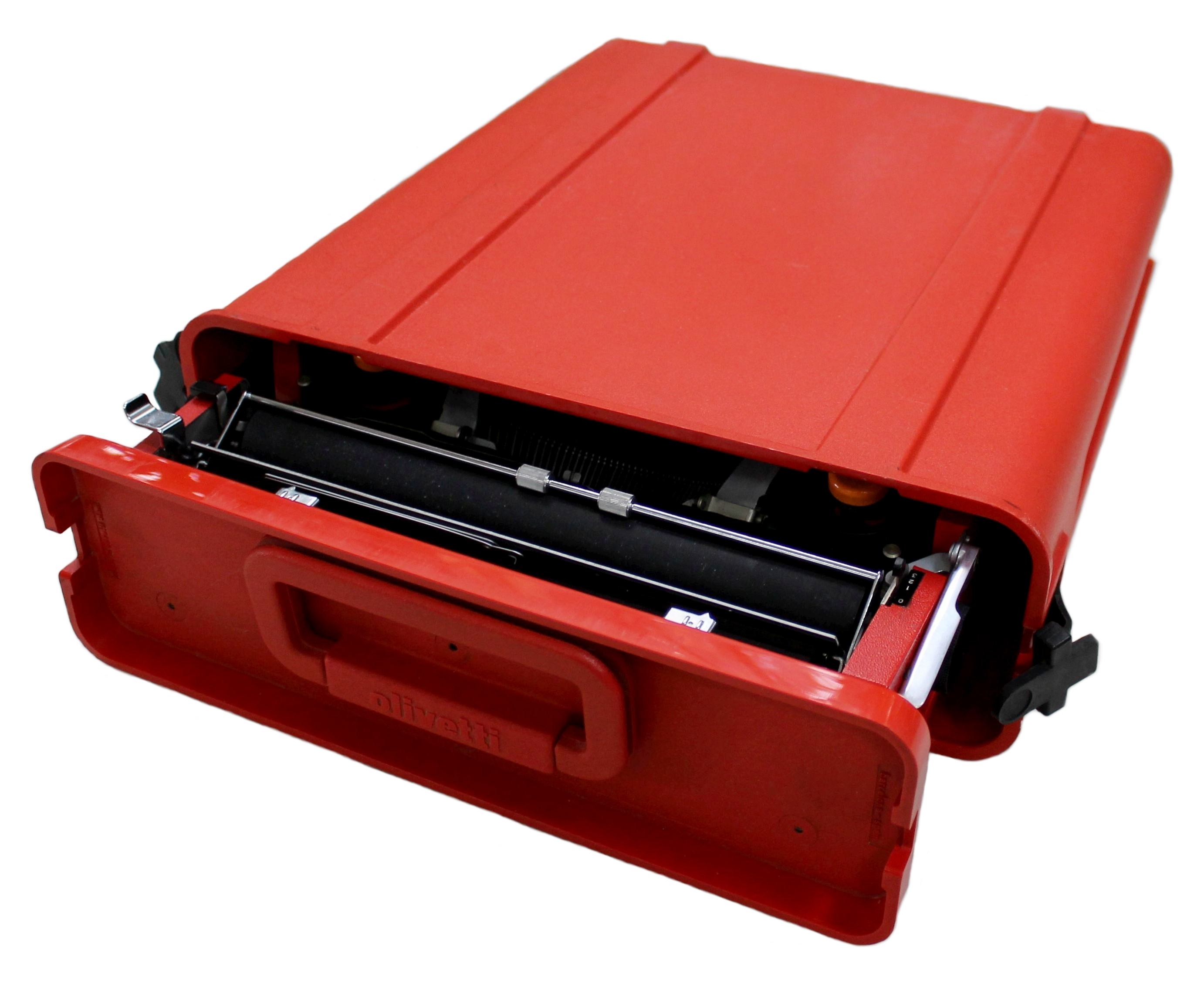
Olivetti Valentine (another view with case)

Video of the Olivetti Valentine in use.

Olivetti originally conceived the Valentine as a response to the early 1960s flood of inexpensive pragmatically designed manual typewriters from Japan, such as those from Brother and Silver Seiko.

Believing design should not merely be functional but also sensual and emotionally appealing, Sottsass prototyped his ideas in Moplen (an early trademarked polypropylene), proposing a very basic but boldly colored and highly affordable design: eliminating lower case letters, exposing its ribbon caps and forgoing a bell for the right hand margin. Sottsass lavished cost-effective and attentive details throughout the design, going so far as to carefully resolve in sketch studies, the negative space around each carriage end.

Olivetti resisted, pushing for more features that would ultimately make the typewriter relatively expensive. Olivetti insisted on more expensive color-impregnated, impact-resistant injection-molded ABS plastic, rather than the prototype's Moplen, as well as both upper and lower case capability and the right margin bell. Following these disagreements, Sottsass distanced himself from the project, despite having largely completed the design as well as its launch advertising campaign. His colleagues, British designer Perry King with Canadian Albert Leclerc, completed the work.

The design itself was surprising and non-conformist, largely deconstructing what would typically be the typewriter's bodywork, revealing elements normally concealed, using 'floating keys' and a body-colored plastic 'rail' ahead of the spacebar, visually detached from the typewriter's main body. Sottsass cited the orange nipples and pink breasts in Tom Wesselmann's paintings of nudes as inspiration for the Valentine's orange ribbon caps; he chose the bright red color to emphasize casual creativity rather than the serious monotony of office work.

At a time when most typewriter cases featured elaborate zippers and bulky suitcase designs, Sottsass proposed an inexpensive injection-molded, color-matched plastic sleeve with softly rounded corners and a textured-finish that could mate to the typewriter's plastic bodywork; the rear "plate" of the typewriter became the top of the case, locking onto the typewriter itself via two black rubber straps/tabs on opposite ends of the case, thus allowing the Valentine to be carried like a briefcase. The case could likewise serve as a trash can or light duty stool when the typewriter was in use. Art historian Deborah Goldberg said a designer expending so much attention on the typewriter case was itself radical.

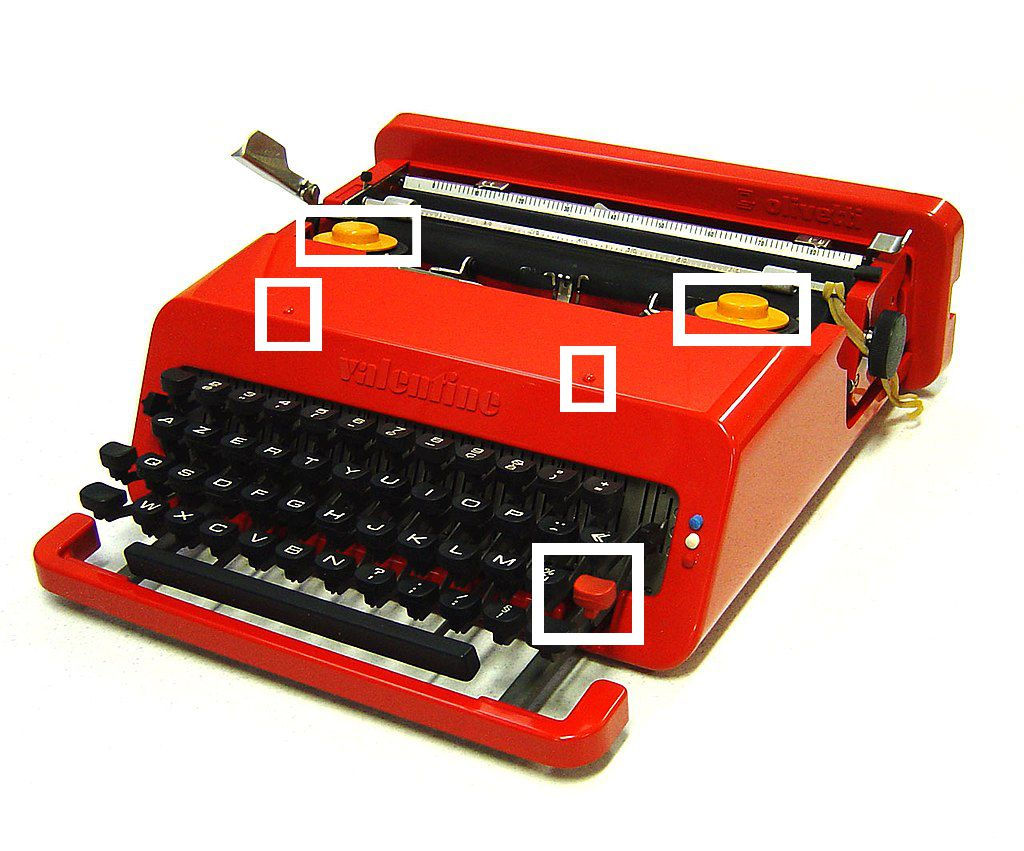
A later Valentine example, highlighted with several prominent changes, made over the course of production: enlarged orange ribbon spool covers, dimples to mitigate scuffing and tab key with tab function. Valentine S model did not include a tabulator.

Details included black plastic keys and white lettering; orange plastic ribbon spool caps, silver metal return arm and paper guide; twin chrome, rabbit-ear style paper supports; black rubber feet; red plastic swing handle at back of typewriter, as well as integral raised "Valentine" lettering along the front and "olivetti" at the rear plate. At introduction, the user manual was printed on a set of small "tags" held together with a loop of string, with cheeky phrasing describing the main functions, accompanied by simple black and white illustrations. Over the course of production, design revisions included enlarging the orange ribbon caps, and adding two prominent dimples at the top of the bodywork, to help prevent scuffing when removing the typewriter or returning it to its case.

Though often called la rossa portatile (the red portable), the Valentine was also subsequently manufactured in very small numbers in white, blue and green, respectively for Italy, France and Germany.

A number of similar typewriters either preceded or closely emulated the Valentine's design. Notably, the Valentine shared numerous features (including its bold red color, floating black keys, and ABS typewriter body with a pronounced rear plate that mated to a plastic sleeve case) with the Monpti typewriter, designed by Stefan Lengyel in 1968 (the same year the Valentine was designed) for Zbrojovka Brno NP in Vyškov, Czechoslovakia. Furthermore, industrial designer Carl Wilhelm Sundberg (Netherlands, 1910–1982), working for Sperry Rand Corporation, patented a plastic-bodied typewriter in 1963 without specifying ABS for the company's forthcoming, red typewriter, the Remington Starfire. On March 31, 1972, Antares SPA of Milan registered a US trademark for the Antares Lisa, a typewriter with a similar deconstructionist design (floating keys, floating spacebar, with visually detached body-colored "rail" ahead of the spacebar). This was ultimately marketed in the US as the Montgomery Ward Model 22.

Over the course of time, Sottsass saw the design as cloying and came to openly resent the Valentine, saying: "I worked sixty years of my life, and it seems the only thing I did is this fucking red machine. And it came out a mistake. It was supposed to be a very inexpensive portable, to sell in the market like [a disposable pen] ... then the people at Olivetti said you cannot sell this."

== Advertising and sales ==
Sottsass wanted the Valentine to have its own distinct image, that would "prevail over the global image of Olivetti." Together, they committed to creating the market for the Valentine, prioritizing the demographic that might appreciate the typewriter's design statement as a leisure item, as much if not more than its mechanical specification. It would appeal to "young people or people with a youthful sensibility, open to the appeal of the new and fashionable," the advertisements for the Valentine portraying "a desire to be creative and take risks."

Olivetti conducted extensive market research. In Olivetti's marketing statement at the Valentine's introduction, Sottsass noted:

Since they asked us to think about designing the ad(s) for this product as well, we tried to do something that represented and explained these ideas, and we went to put the Valentine in as many places as possible to see how it behaved and what was happening around it and we took a lot of photographs.

So after a while we came into possession of a large documentation, a sort of reportage of the journey made among people by an object instead of a person, and it didn't even go that bad, because everyone was quite happy to play with this Valentine and to be together with her and for the rest she too, this red object, ended up blending in quite well with the things that already exist in the world, the natural things and the artificial things that make this great confusion in which we live.

The launch advertising ultimately used a range of graphic artists: Sottsass himself along with Roberto Pieraccini, Walter Ballmer, Egidio Bonfante, Tadaaki Kanasashi, Tesro Itoh, Yoshitaro Isaka, George Leavitt, Graziella Marchi, Adrianus Van Der Elst and Milton Glaser, playing off the painting The Death of Procris (circa 1495) by Piero di Cosimo, depicted the Valentine in a renaissance setting with a dog, suggesting that "it, too, was man’s best friend."

The Valentine was positioned as a mass consumer product that anyone could use anywhere. Large posters were posted on city streets, in subways and railway; radio spots announced its arrival along with advertisements in popular magazines. Olivetti also commissioned a series of short, avant garde video advertising spots (available on Youtube) to be played before movies, during the previews, including: Woman with cigar; Write From the Heart; Woman in Space; Young Japanese; Boy with Motorcycle; Young Hippies; Pinball; and The Red Portable. (Note: The following YouTube links for Valentine publicity spots retrieved on February 17, 2024: Woman with cigar (Italian: Donna con il sigaro); Write from the heart; Woman in Space (Italian: Donna nello spazio); Young Japanese (Italian: Adolescente giapponese); Boy with Motorcycle (Italian: Ragazzo con la moto); Young Hippies (Italian: Giovani hippies); Pinball (Italian: Flipper); The Red Portable (Italian: La portatile rossa))

At Olivetti's 1969 presentation, Sottsass announced, "the portable, today, becomes an object that one carries with him like one wears a jacket, shoes, or hat; I mean those things that we pay attention to and don't pay attention to; things that come and go, things that we tend to demystify more and more". (Note: (Italian: La portatile, oggi, diventa un oggetto che uno si porta dietro come si porta dietro la giacca, le scarpe, il cappello; voglio dire quelle cose alle quali si bada e non-si bada, cose che vanno e vengono, cose che tendiamo a smitizzare sempre di più.))

The Valentine was formally introduced on Valentine's Day 1969 to a largely unreceptive market. Production took place initially in Italy, then later in Spain and Mexico. At introduction in the United States the Valentine retailed for $259, when a Royal Mercury metal bodied ultra-portable retailed for $49. While Olivetti had projected sales in the millions, the Valentine managed sales in the few tens of thousands; it was initially retired and only returned to production by popular demand.

== In popular culture ==
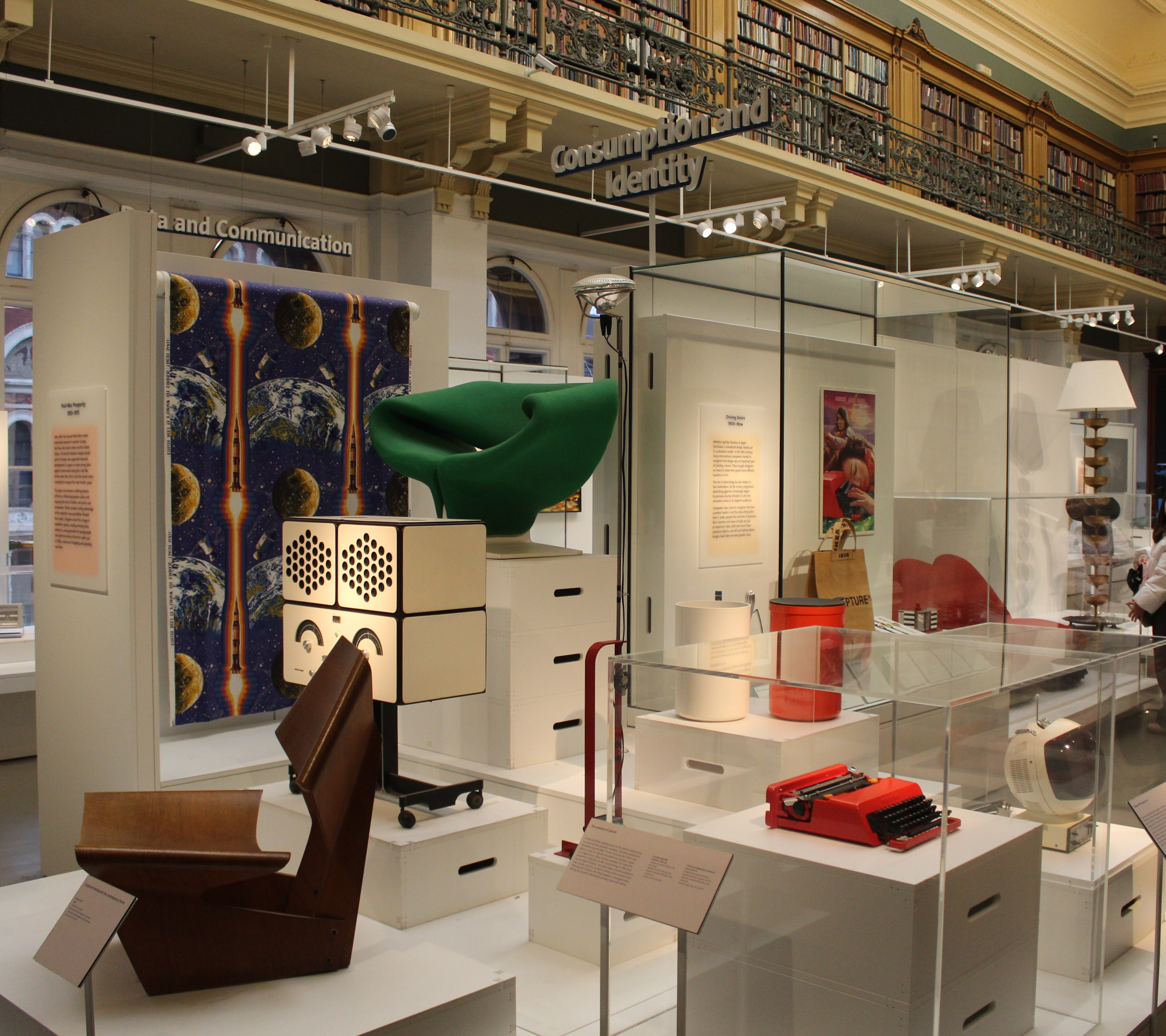
An example pictured in Room 76, Victoria and Albert Museum, London (2024)

Brigitte Bardot was photographed with a Valentine; in 1970 Richard Burton and Elizabeth Taylor were photographed at Heathrow Airport carrying a Valentine; and the Valentine was used by the main character in Stanley Kubrick’s A Clockwork Orange (1971). Braun-Designer Dieter Rams owned a Valentine. It appeared in the 2007 film The Witnesses.

In 1999, in its home town of Ivrea, the Olivetti Historical Archive mounted an exhibition honouring the 30th Anniversary of the Valentine, titled Rosso, Rosso Valentine, subsequently replicated in Milan, Prague, Budapest, Genoa and Turin.

In 2016, David Bowie's Valentine typewriter sold at an auction at Sotheby's in London for £45,000, against a presale estimate of £300–£500.

In 2017, Peter Olivetti, great grandson of Camillo Olivetti, founder of the Olivetti corporation, created a tribute to the Valentine as a bicycle, using the 100th anniversary Cento tubeset created by the Italian company, Columbus. It featured details recalling the typewriter: the color, the three small dots of color recalling the typewriters ribbon selection, and an orange dot on the pump recalling the ribbon caps.

== See also ==
- Olivetti typewriters (all models)
- Olivetti S.p.A.
- List of works in the Museum of Modern Art
