= Royal Typewriter Company =

American typewriter manufacturing company

Royal Consumer Information Products, Inc.
- Company type: Private company
- Industry: Information technology
- Founded: 1904
- Founder: Edward B. Hess
- Headquarters: Hartford, Connecticut, U.S.
- Products: See Typewriters section

Royal Consumer Information Products, Inc. (formerly The Royal Typewriter Company) is an American technology company founded in January 1904 as a manufacturer of typewriters. Royal’s product line has evolved to include cash registers, shredders, personal digital assistants (PDAs)/electronic organizers, postal scales, weather stations, and a wide range of original and compatible/remanufactured imaging supplies supporting printers, faxes, and copiers. The company is headquartered in Hartford, Connecticut.

== History ==
The Royal Typewriter Company was founded by Edward B. Hess and Lewis C. Myers in January 1904 in a machine shop in Brooklyn, New York. The next year, Hess and Myers turned to Thomas Fortune Ryan, to whom they demonstrated a prototype typewriter. Their machine had numerous innovations including a friction-free, ball-bearing, one-track rail to support the weight of the carriage, a new paper feed, a lighter and faster typebar action, and complete visibility of the words as they are typed. Ryan put up $220,000 in exchange for financial control.

In March 1906 the first Royal typewriter, the Royal Standard, was sold. The Royal Standard was set apart from its competition by its 'flatbed' design.

With demand increasing, Royal purchased 5¼ acres in Hartford, Connecticut, as the new site for its manufacturing facility. Original plans called for the Royal Typewriter Company Building to have a floor capacity of 250,000 square feet (23,000 m^{2}) and cost $350,000 to build. In 1908, Royal began manufacturing there and in time, Royal and cross town competitor, Underwood Typewriter Company, would make Hartford the “Typewriter Capital of the World”.

In 1911, Royal introduced the Royal 5 typewriter, which also utilized the "flatbed" design.

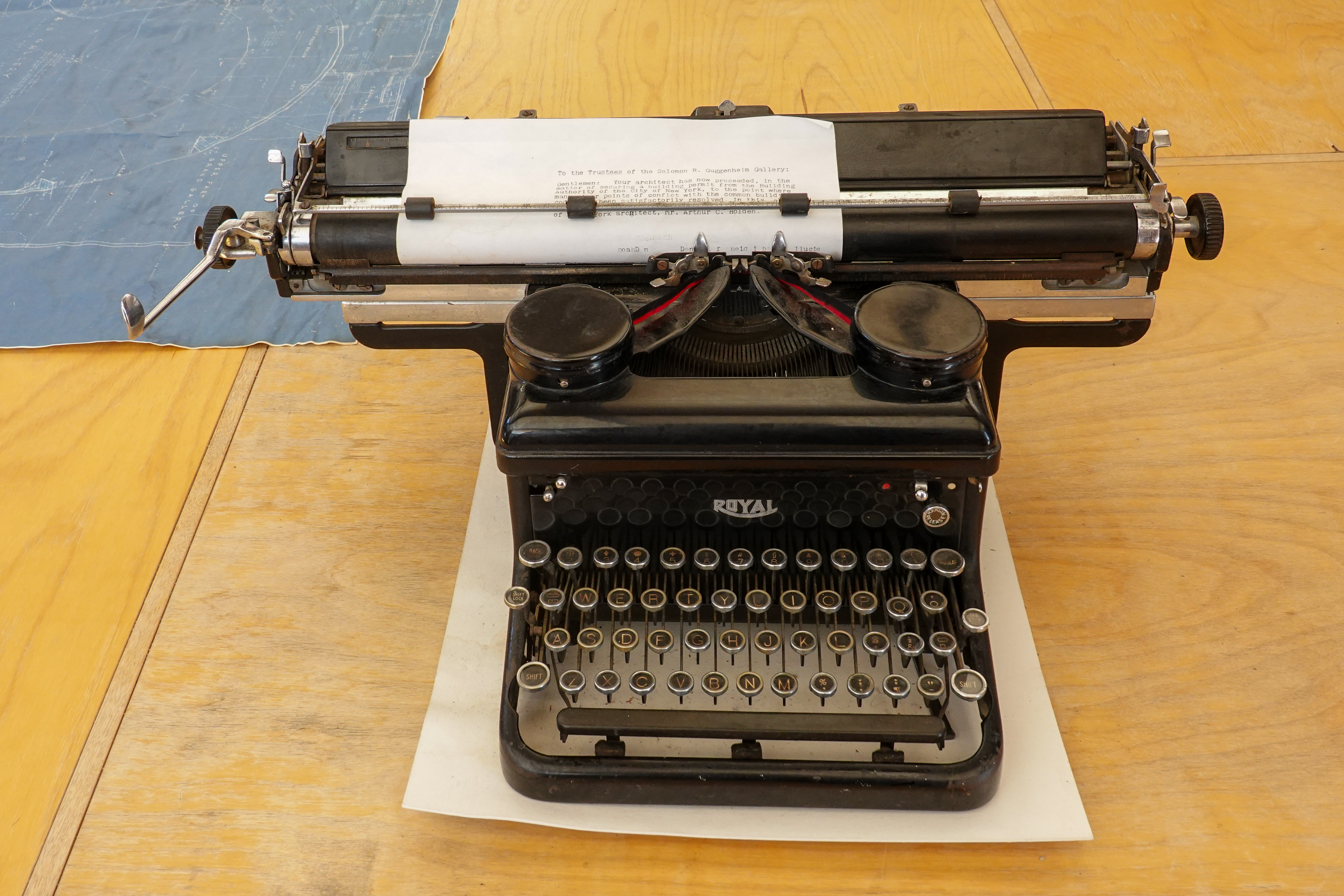
Frank Lloyd Wright's Royal 10 typewriter at Taliesin West, Arizona

Royal's first model utilizing the "upright" design was the Royal 10, which came out in 1914. Original models had two beveled glass panes on each side.

In 1926 Royal introduced the "Roytype" brand name for its line of typewriter ribbons and carbon paper.

In order to promote the new portable Royal president G. E. Smith secured the exclusive sponsorship of the September 23, 1926, Dempsey–Tunney championship fight for $35,000. This boxing match was the first nationwide radio hook-up.

Daily News of New York estimated that 20 million fans from coast to coast listened to the broadcast.

Royal's introduction of its portable line of typewriters was an immediate success and launched the company to become the world's #1 selling typewriter brand.

On October 9, 1926, the Hartford Daily Courant reported that Royal had just produced its one millionth typewriter.

To promote the ruggedness of its typewriters, George Edward Smith, president of Royal, bought a Ford-Stout tri-motor airplane in August 1927. This plane, commonly called the Royal Airtruck, dropped over 200 typewriters in crates with parachutes to dealers over the eastern seaboard of the USA on its maiden flight. Royal eventually delivered over 11,000 typewriters this way with only ten being damaged.

In January 1941, Edward B. Hess, one of Royal's founders and vice presidents, died in Orlando, Florida. Hess was a prolific inventor and held over 140 patents relating to the typewriter.

World War II brought tremendous change to Royal. In order to aid the war effort, Royal converted its manufacturing to war work exclusively. Royal manufactured machine guns, rifles, bullets, propellers, and spare parts for airplane engines. It wouldn't be until September 1945 that Royal started typewriter production full-time again and not until December 1948 that it caught up on its pre-war backlog.

Royal's most popular models were in the Quiet Deluxe series of portable typewriters, produced from 1939 until 1959 (with a gap during WWII).

In 1947, Royal produced, in limited quantity, a gold-plated version of its popular Quiet Deluxe model. Ian Fleming, the British novelist who wrote the James Bond novels, used a gold-plated Quiet Deluxe. Many other writers used a Quiet Deluxe, including Ernest Hemingway, or other models of Royal typewriter, including John Steinbeck.

Other typewriter manufacturers utilized Royal's innovations in their typewriters. In 1947, Royal won patent suits against Remington and LC Smith Corona.

In February 1950, Royal introduced its first electric typewriter.

Lewis C. Myers, the surviving founder of the Royal Typewriter Company, died in Freeport, New York at the age of 84.

Worldwide demand caused Royal to open a new factory in Leiden, the Netherlands, to produce typewriters in 1953.

In April 1954, the Royal typewriter Company announced its plan to merge with McBee, a leading manufacturer of accounting and statistical machines and supplies. By July, Royal stockholders had approved the plan and Royal McBee was formed.

From 1954 to 1964 sales soared from $84.7 million to over $113 million. Royal McBee was consistently listed as a Fortune 500 company.

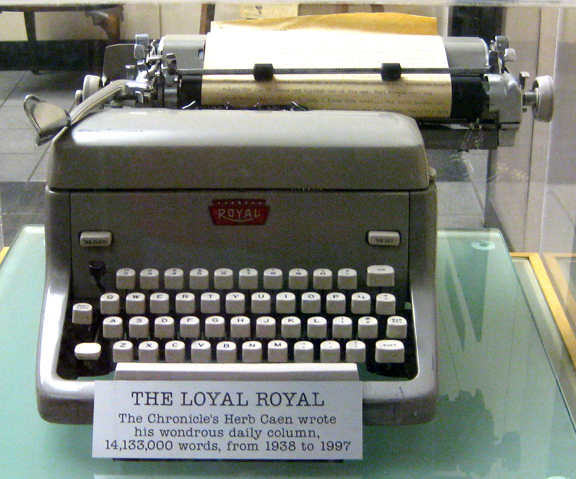
A Royal FP typewriter used for many years by Pulitzer Prize-winner Herb Caen in preparing his daily column. He called it his "Loyal Royal".

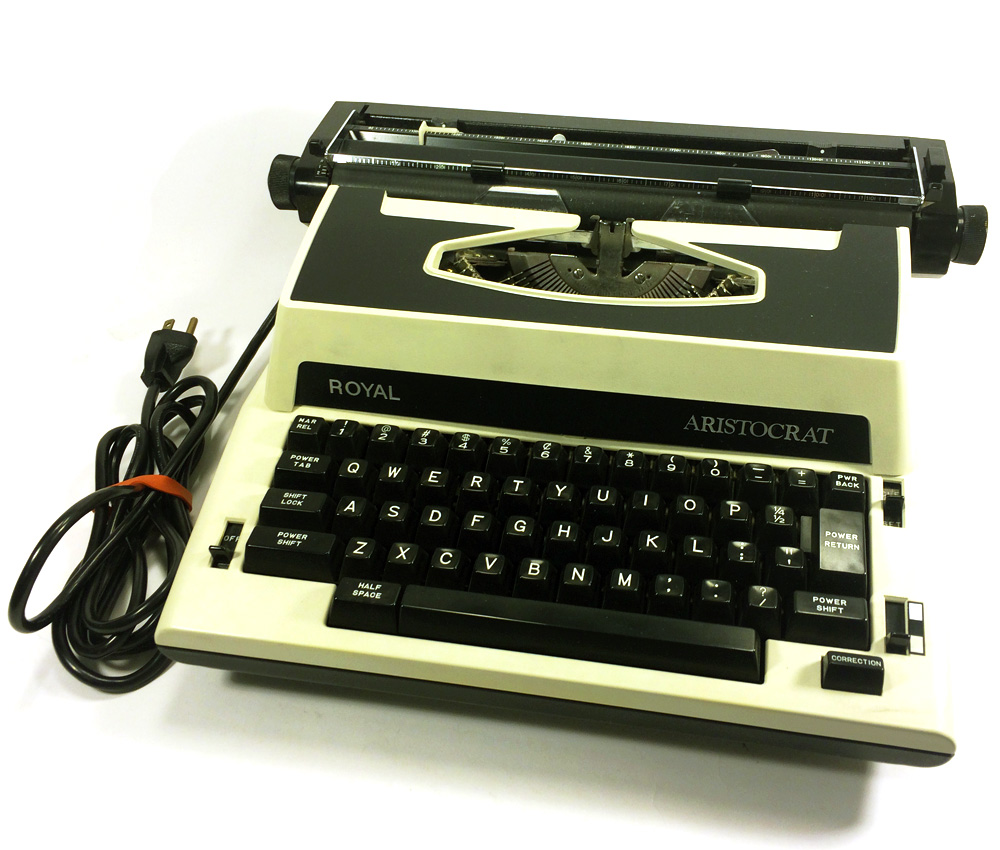
Royal Aristocrat Electric Typewriter

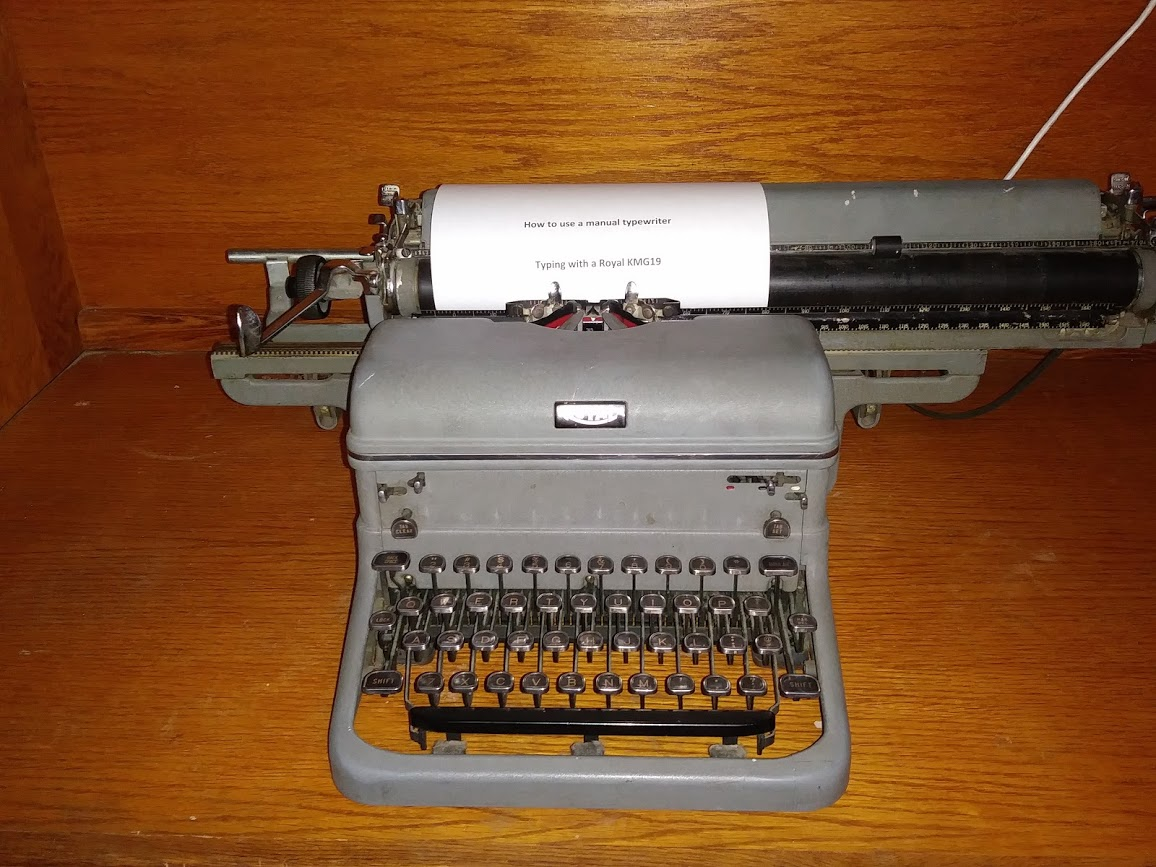
Royal KMG19

In December 1957, Royal announced it had just produced its 10 millionth typewriter. Congratulations were received from U.S. Secretary of Commerce Sinclair Weeks and the Governor of Connecticut, Abe Ribicoff.

In December 1964, Litton Industries' stockholders approved the acquisition of Royal McBee. The deal became final in March 1965. Litton would change the name of Royal McBee back to Royal Typewriter and reorganize the company into five divisions: Royal Typewriter, Roytype Consumer Products, Roytype Supplies, McBee Systems, and RMB.

October 1966 saw Litton announce plans to acquire the English typewriter producer Imperial, through its Royal Typewriter division.

In January 1969, Litton Industries further cemented its hold on the typewriter market by purchasing the German typewriter manufacturer, Triumph-Adler. Almost immediately, the U.S. government filed an anti-trust suit against Litton accusing it of creating a monopoly. The FTC ruled in March 1973 that Litton had to divest itself of Triumph-Adler. Litton appealed and, in a rare reversal, the FTC issued a ruling in April 1975 stating that Litton could keep Triumph-Adler.

In March 1979, Volkswagen, seeking to diversify, announced its intention to acquire a 55% stake in Triumph-Adler. Included in the deal was Royal Typewriter.

Sales continued to climb and by 1982 sales in North America of Royal and Triumph-Adler totaled over $600 million.

In April 1986, Olivetti, the Italian typewriter/computer manufacturer, announced plans to purchase Triumph-Adler and Royal from Volkswagen. For nearly two decades Royal was a part of the Olivetti family.

By the 1970s and 1980s, the typewriter market matured under the market dominance of large companies from Britain, Europe and the United States. Before the advent of daisywheel and electronic machines — Royal as well as the other major manufacturers faced strong competition from typewriters from Asia, including Brother Industries and Silver Seiko Ltd. of Japan.

In September 2004, Royal became a private American company again.

As of 2019, Royal is still introducing new typewriters under the Royal brand name.

On 1 November 2021, Royal Consumer Information Products, Inc. (for the Americas) and the Czechia-based Moravia Consulting spol. s r.o. (for all other markets) became the licensees of HP Development Company, L.P. to continue the development, production, distribution, marketing and support of HP-branded calculators.

In March 2024, Royal Consumer Information Products underwent a significant organizational change. The company has now officially split into two distinct entities:

Royal Consumer Information Products, Inc. - This entity will focus on continuing the core operations and services of the original company within the United States and other international markets.

Royal Consumer Information Products de Mexico - This entity will handle the company's operations and services specifically within Mexico Central America, the Caribbean, and Latin America.

This strategic split was designed to enhance Royal's operational efficiency and better serve diverse markets.

== Typewriters ==
Model	Year Introduced	Notes
Royal 1 (Standard)	1906	First model, flatbed design
Royal 5	1911	Flatbed, 11" carriage
Royal 6	1911	Flatbed, 15" carriage
Royal 8	1911	Flatbed, 19" carriage
Royal 10	1914	Upright design, Beveled glass sides
Royal Portable	1926	First portable model
Royal Portable (2nd Model)	1931	Second portable model
Royal Signet	1932-3	Depression-era, low-cost portable
Royal H	1934	
Royal KHM	1935-7	Round raised cover over ribbons
Royal Junior	1935	Depression-Era, low-cost portable
Royal 'O' Portable Standard	1935	Similar to the Royal 'A' Deluxe but with no automatic paper lock or tabulator. Only sold in black.
Royal 'A' Deluxe	1935	Touch control, finger comfort keys, automatic paper lock, tabulator. Multiple colors available for purchase.
Royal Aristocrat (1st Model)	1939	Large portable. Tabs were set manually.
Royal KMM	1939	Hinged top, touch control, Introduced "Magic Margin" system
Royal Quiet Deluxe Portable	1939	
Royal Companion (1st model)	1941	A Royal Varsity, with a two-color ribbon.
Royal Varsity	1941	Replaced the Royal Junior and Signet—a low-cost portable typewriter.
Royal Quiet Deluxe (2nd model)	1948	Designed by Henry Dreyfuss
Royal Arrow	1948 (?)	For military use during World War II
Royal KMG	1949	Same overall design as the "KMM" with an extra long carriage and color change to grey.
Royal Companion (2nd Model)	1950	Designed by Henry Dreyfuss
Royal	1950	Royal's first electric typewriter
Royal Diana	1953	Made in Mannheim, Germany. Made until 1959.
Royal HH	1954	Hinged Top, Touch Control, Portable
Royal Royalite	1955	Made in Leiden. Small portable.
Royal Senior Companion	1955	Low-cost, full-size portable typewriter.
Royal Companion (3rd model)	1955	Lower-cost version of the Senior Companion.
Royal Quiet Deluxe (3rd model)	1955	Came in a choice of six colors
Royal Futura (1st Model)	1958	First Royal portable with keyboard-level tab clear/set.
Royal Heritage, Heritage Deluxe, Heritage III	1959	Essentially a Royal Futura but sold exclusively at Montgomery Ward.
Royal All-American	1961	Royal Futura body with no "Magic Margins" or "Touch Control". Same as "Tab-O-Matic" but different color and different luggage case.
Royal Aristocrat (2nd Model)	1961	Tri-Tone Royal Futura body with no "Magic Margins." Similar to "Tab-O-Matic" and "All American" but with keys like the Heritage line.
Royal Tab-O-Matic (1st Model)	1961	Royal Futura body with no "Magic Margins" or "Touch Control". Same as "All-American" but different color and different luggage case.
Royal Eldorado	1962	Royalite painted black and gold.
Royal Dart	1962	A special Royalite made for Montgomery Ward, with a raised ribbon cover.
Royal Lark	1962	A special Royalite, with a raised ribbon cover.
Royal Empress	1962	Large, futuristic office typewriter
Royalite '64	1963	Royal Royalite, with a two-color ribbon. Offered in either light yellow, or gray.
Royal 5000SDW	1964	
Royal Safari	1964	Full-featured portable typewriter.
Royal Custom II	1965	A full-sized portable typewriter, available in either red or charcoal. One of the last Royal portables to be produced in the United States.
Royalite '65	1964	Royalite, with new design, based on the Royal Futura.
Royal Skylark	1965	A small, plastic-bodied Royalite.
Royalite (Model 2)	1966	Small plastic typewriter, with snap-on lid.
Royal '890'	1966	Came in either white, beige, or gray
Royal Telstar	1966	Basically a Royal Safari, with fewer features, and sold at a lower price.
Royal 550	1967	
Royal Aristocrat (3rd Model)	1968	Similar to Royal Safari. Doesn't have a "1" key but does have a "+" key.
Royal Mercury	1968	Metal-bodied ultra-portable, a badge engineered variant of the Silver Reed Silverette (et al) made by Silver Seiko Ltd. of Japan. Early models are painted ivory.
Royal Century	1968	Like the Royal Mercury, except painted two-tone blue, with a raised ribbon cover.
Royal Signet	1968	Like the Royal Mercury; lacks touch control and two-color ribbon. Came in gray
Royal Jet	1968	Blue version of the Signet.
Royal Futura (2nd Model)	1968	A gold and white Royal 890 design was sold as the "Futura" in 1968.
Royal Apollo	1969	Electric portable typewriter.
Royal Jetstar	1970	Fully-Electric Personal Typewriter.
Royal Tab-O-Matic (second design)	1972	Royal Mercury with preset tabulator. Painted dark brown.
Royal Sabre	1972	One of the first Royal portables to be manufactured in Portugal
Royal Astronaut	1972	Plastic portable typewriter, with a modernistic design. Made in Japan.
Royal Custom III	1973	A full-sized portable typewriter available in two tone deep red/white or blue/white.
Royal Fleetwood	1972	Woodgrained plastic portable, based on Royal Sprite. Made by Silver-Reed. Also called Caravan. Had transistor radio in its case.
Royal Sprite	1972	Plastic typewriter, with a transistor radio mounted in its case.
Royal Sahara	1975	A rebadged Adler Tippa S, made of bright-blue plastic.
Royal Safari (Model 2)	1979	Made in Portugal
Royal Cavalier	Pre-1990	
Royal Safari III	1989	Made in Korea. Manual portable.
Royal Scrittore	ca. 2012	Made in China. Manual portable.
Royal Scrittore II	ca. 2012	Made in China. Manual portable.
Royal Epoch	ca. 2015	Made in China. Manual portable.

During the 1980s, Royal also produced consumer daisy wheel printers like the Royal LetterMaster and Royal OfficeMaster 2000, the former being a cheaper model.

== Computers ==
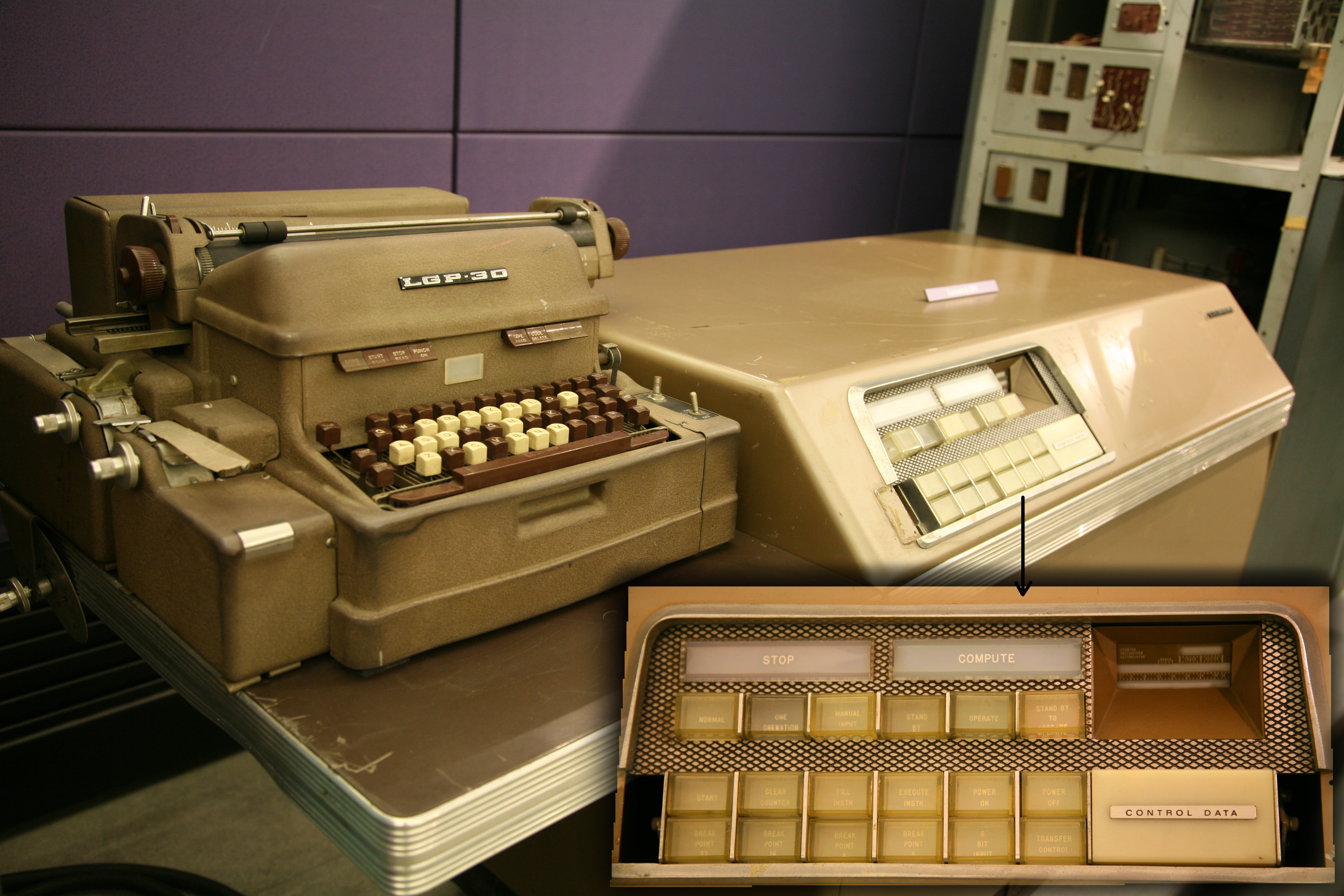
An LGP-30 computer by Royal McBee

Royal McBee sold and serviced early computers, the RPC-4000 and RPC-9000 (both from 1960). Royal McBee also partnered with General Precision in the Royal Precision Electronic Computer Company, which sold and serviced the LGP-30 (in 1956) and LGP-21 (in 1963). These were so-called "desk computers" [sic] – approximatively office desk-size single-user computers, sometimes considered minicomputers (q.v.). They were manufactured by the Librascope division of General Precision. Royal McBee was based in Port Chester, New York.

The RPC-4000 is the computer on which Mel Kaye performed a legendary programming task in machine code, as told by Ed Nather in the hacker epic The Story of Mel.

== In popular culture ==
A Royal typewriter is a large story element in Stephen King's novel Misery.

60 Minutes correspondent Morley Safer was known to write all of his scripts on a Royal typewriter.

A Royal typewriter with a Prestige Elite typeface was one of the items found at Zodiac suspect Arthur Leigh Allen's apartment, matching the typewriter the Zodiac killer used to write letters sent to the Riverside Police Department.

== See also ==
- Edge-notched card – The McBee Company, which merged with Royal Typewriter in 1954, manufactured Keysort cards and accessories from the 1930s
