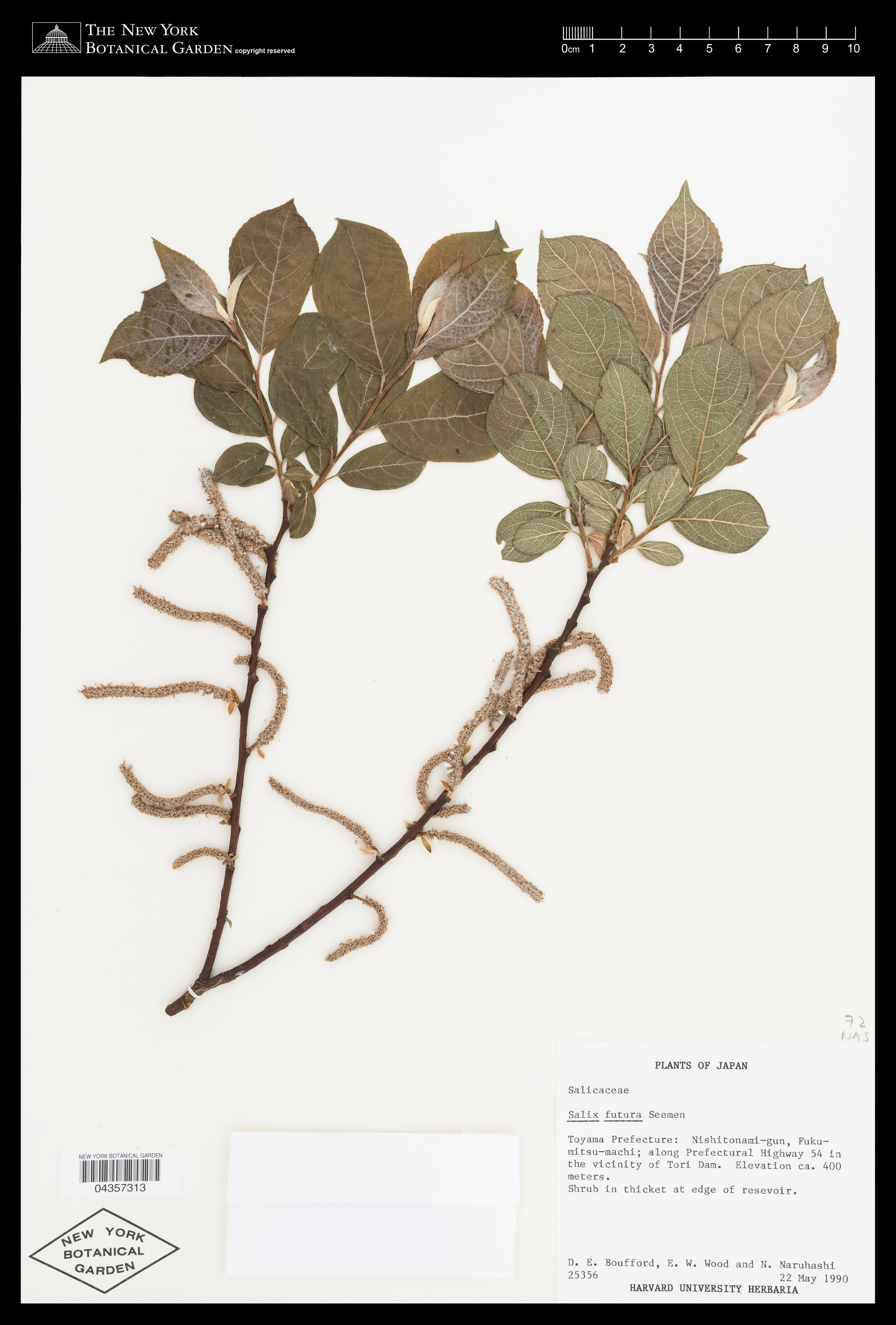

Scientific classification
- Kingdom: Plantae
- Clade: Tracheophytes
- Clade: Angiosperms
- Clade: Eudicots
- Clade: Rosids
- Order: Malpighiales
- Family: Salicaceae
- Genus: Salix
- Species: S. futura

Binomial name
- Salix futura Seemen.

= Salix futura =

Species of willow

Salix futura is a species of willow native to central Japan. It is a deciduous large shrub, reaching a height of 2 m.
