= Royal Quiet Deluxe =

Portable typewriter model

The Royal Quiet Deluxe was a portable typewriter, made by the Royal Typewriter Company, from 1939 until 1959. The first-generation Quiet Deluxe was the first Royal to feature Magic Margin. The first generation of Royal Quiet Deluxe was manufactured from 1939 until 1948, with a gap in production due to World War II. It was the typewriter of choice for Ernest Hemingway.

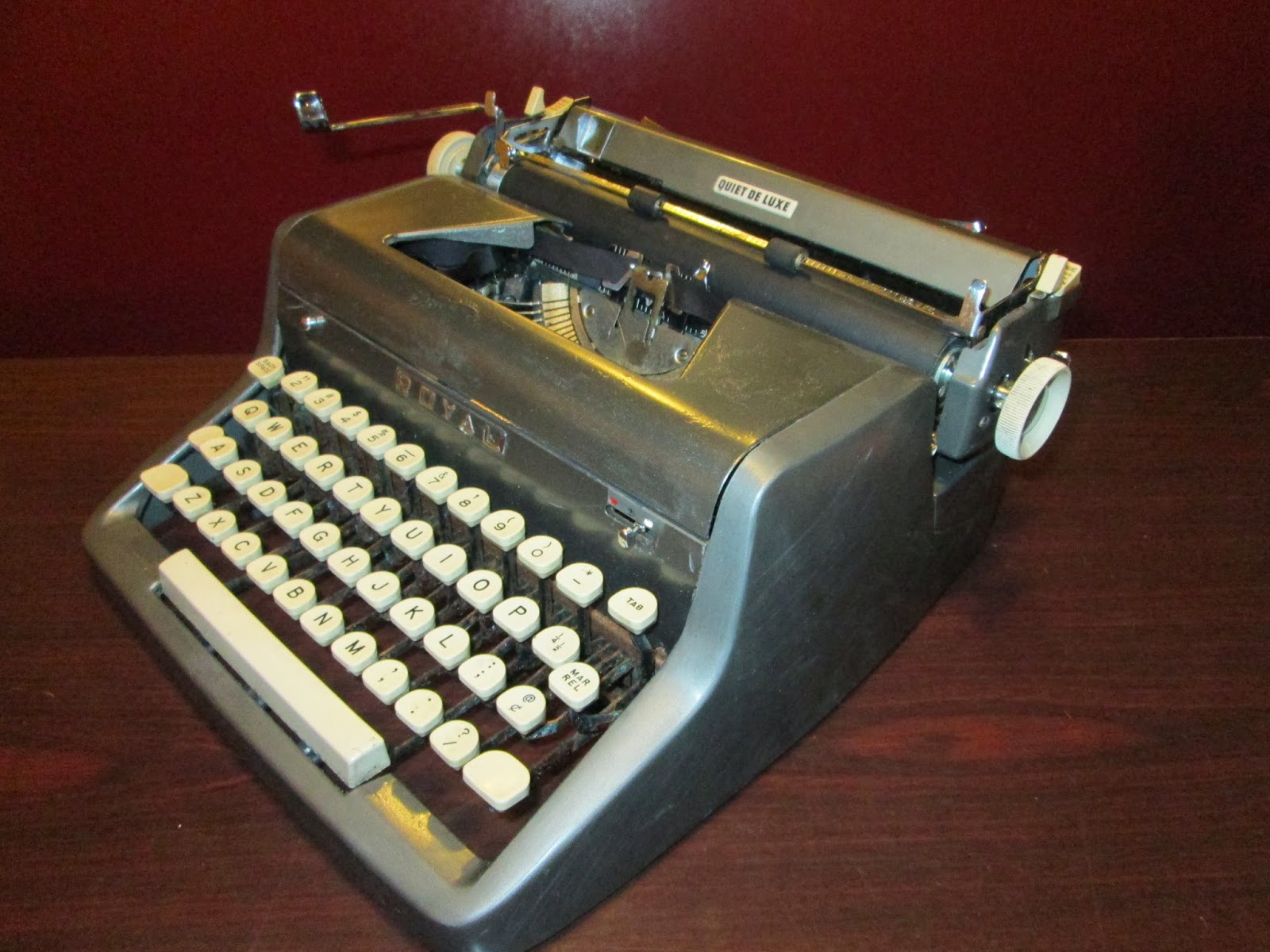
A well-used 1955 Royal Quiet Deluxe typewriter

In the late 1940s, the Royal Quiet Deluxe was redesigned by Henry Dreyfuss. It was redesigned again in 1950, with the corners rounded off. By 1955, it was being offered in a choice of six colours, and gray. According to The Typewriter Database, the last Royal Quiet Deluxe typewriters were made in 1957. Most typewriters called the Quiet Deluxe were made in the United States, except for the later, rounded plastic machines bearing the name "Quiet Deluxe." These were made in The Netherlands. The typewriter pictured is a 1954 model, which was made in Hartford, Connecticut.

According to Machines of Loving Grace, an online museum of typewriters by a prolific collector, the Quiet Deluxe was a refinement of the earlier Standard and DeLuxe models. "The DeLuxe is very similar to the Portable Standard in style and function. It has the addition of a tabulator, a paper guide, and of course its signature 'crinkle' finish and chromed bands. Down the road, the DeLuxe would be merged with the short-lived Quiet model and become one of Royal's most popular models, the Quiet DeLuxe.", and the Quiet Deluxe was later updated to add a cover release, a carriage-return tension adjustment, a remaining-paper guide, and relocated tab adjustments.

The Royal Typewriter Company produced a special edition of the Quiet Deluxe with gold-plated accents, "Some of these golden models were given as awards to Royal Typewriter company employees. Others were given to high school students who were winners of writing competitions sponsored by Royal Typewriter."

One of these is reported to have been commissioned by author Ian Fleming "After finishing the first draft of Casino Royale, Ian Fleming rewarded himself with a Royal Quiet Deluxe Portable gold-plated typewriter, which he used to write the rest of his books and short stories. Fleming bought the gold-plated Royal Quiet Deluxe Portable typewriter from a New York dealer in 1952". According to the Guinness Book of World Records, this typewriter is the world's most expensive: "Ian Fleming's gold plated typewriter, which was commissioned by the James Bond writer in 1952, was sold for £56,250 ($90,309) at Christie's, London, UK on 5 May 1995." Author Ernest Hemingway also used a Quiet De Luxe. "A manual Royal typewriter that once belonged to Ernest Hemingway, made around 1940 and still in its well-worn leather carrying case, sold for $2,750 at a multi-estate sale held June 24th [2007] by Four Seasons Auction Gallery" in Atlanta, Georgia, although it is not clear whether this typewriter was a Quiet De Luxe or the very-similar Arrow model that Hemingway also used.
