= Futura (clothing) =

Dutch clothing brand

- Industry: Fashion
- Founded: May 2014
- Founder: Anne Bosman & Tom Renema
- Defunct: December 2016
- Headquarters: Deventer, Netherlands
- Key people: Anne Bosman, Sanne Schepers & Tom Renema
- Website: www.futuraofficial.com

Futura (styled FUTURA) is a Dutch men's and womenswear brand founded in 2014 by Anne Bosman (born 24 June 1988 in Amsterdam) and Tom Renema (born 16 October 1990, in Deventer), later joined by Sanne Schepers (born 7 March 1989 in Heerlen). Futura ceased to exist in December 2016, after the trio decided to stop with their cooperation.

== Background ==
Bosman is a 2014 graduate of Central Saint Martins London, with an MA degree in Menswear. He studied for a BA in Fashion Design at ArtEZ in Arnhem. With his graduation collection he won two H&M Design Awards in 2012. Schepers also graduated in 2011 from ArtEZ Arnhem with a BA in Fashion Design. She proceeded to study at the Institut Français de la Mode after she won the G-Star Lichting Award 2011. Renema graduated in 2013 from the HES School of Economics and Business in Amsterdam with a BA degree in International Business Management.

== Style ==
Futura's primary objective was to create designs with a strong, clean, and minimalist aesthetic, utilizing denim fabric to provide a modern appearance to the wearer. Its material focus was on Japanese and Italian denim, organic cotton, and other durable fabrics of Dutch and Portuguese manufacture quality.

== Collections ==
- Spring / Summer 2015 – Bikers on a plane
- Autumn / Winter 2015 – Back to the sign
- Spring / Summer 2016 – Club Futura, July 2015, Mercedes-Benz Fashion Week Amsterdam
- Autumn / Winter 2016 – Racing Ankersmit, January 2016, Mercedes-Benz Fashion Week Amsterdam & January 2016, SEEK Berlin
- Spring / Summer 2017 – Futura community, July 2016, Mercedes-Benz Fashion Week Amsterdam
