= Henry Josiah Griswold =

Knitting machine manufacturer

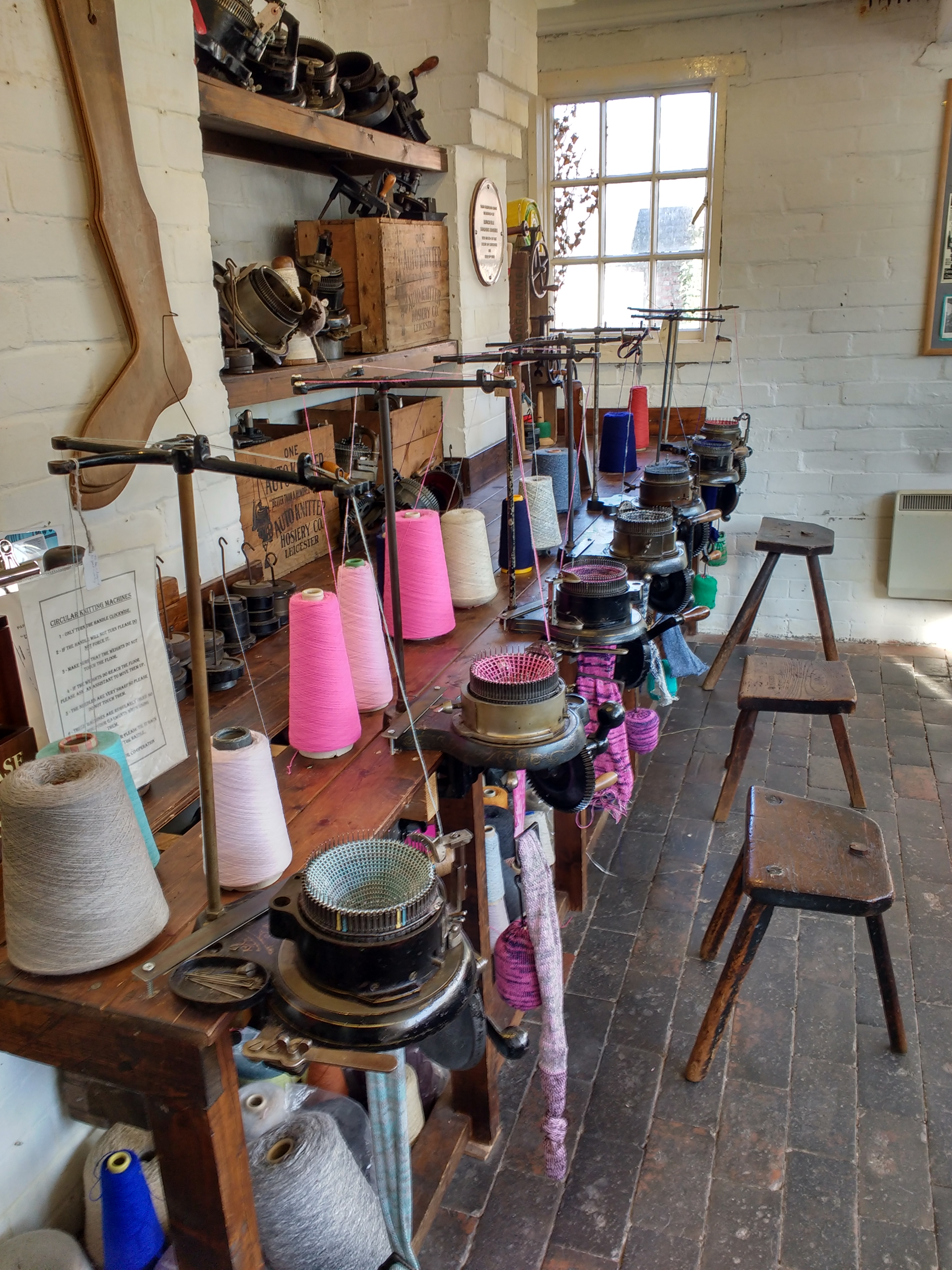
Griswold knitting machines at Ruddington Framework Knitters Museum

Henry Josiah Griswold (1837–1929), born in Madison, Connecticut, had a significant role in modifying circular knitting machines. Because of Henry Josiah Griswold, in England, the word "Griswold" became synonymous with domestic circular knitting machines. He founded a hosiery company in 1891 with the name "London and Leicester Hosiery Company" and also leased a factory on Winifred Street in Leicester. Griswold returned to America between 1890 and 1892 and sold his rights to the firm to I. L. Berridge.

== Patents ==
After Henry Josiah Griswold's 1872 sock machine, fewer framework knitters were needed.

Henry Josiah Griswold received a patent [number 3257] in 1873 for "Improvements in Knitting Machinery," and another patent [number 5048] in 1880 for "Improvements in the stocking manufacturing machines and other knitted fabrics".

== Improvements in knitting machines ==
Henry changed the way that the knitting machines worked so that they were easier to use and made better products. Henry Griswold improved latch-needle knitting by moving the needles individually and directly by bending their shanks. He did this in 1878 with his hand-operated, revolving cam-box, small-diameter sock machine.

== See also ==
- History of knitting
- Walter Golaski
- Knitting needle
- William Lee (inventor)
