= History of knitting =

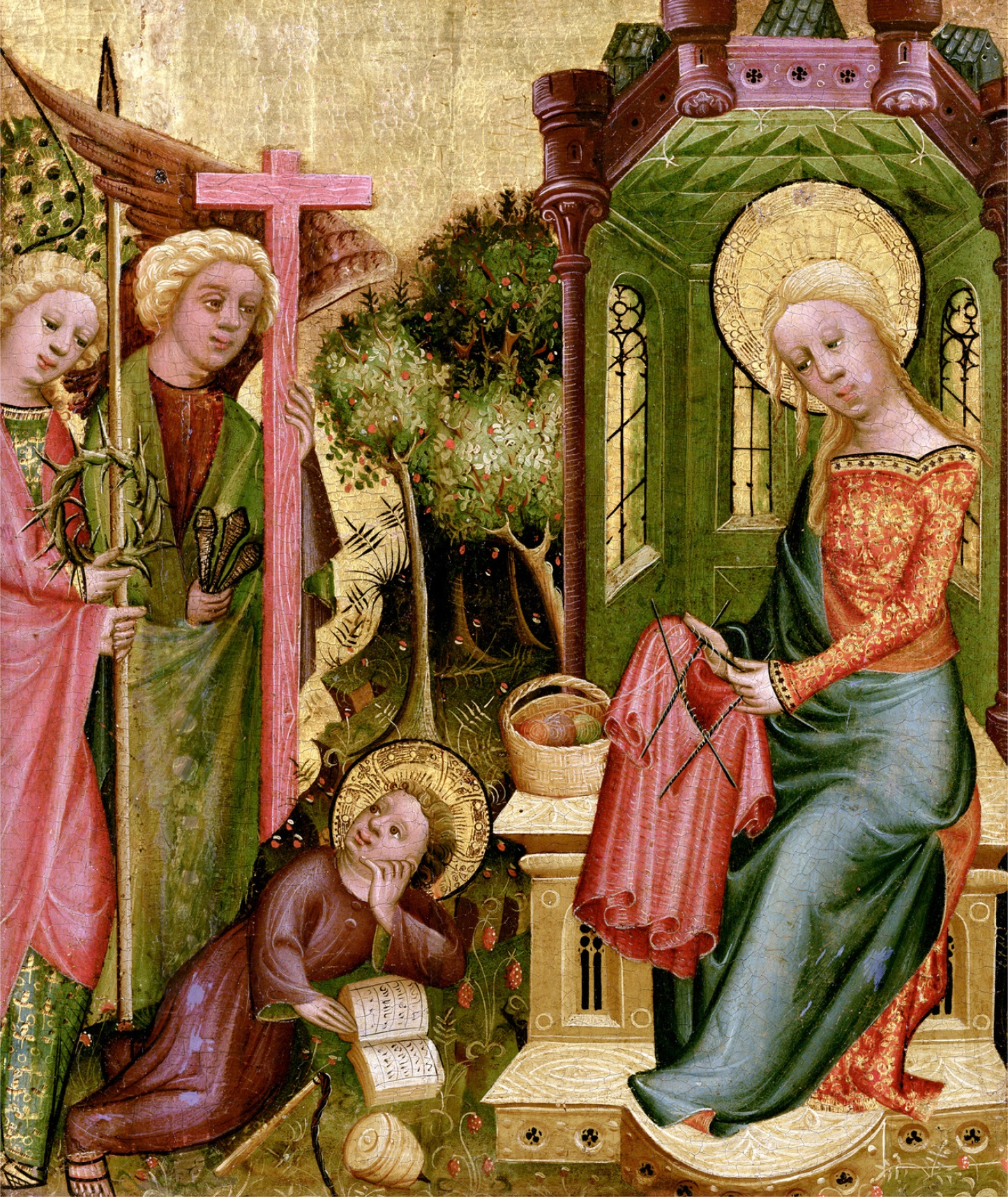
Madonna Knitting, by Bertram of Minden 1400-1410

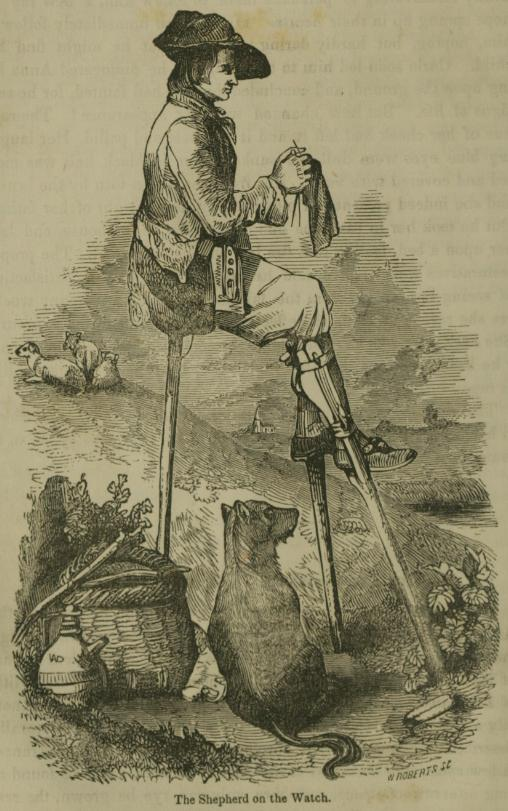
1855 sketch of a shepherd knitting, while watching his flock

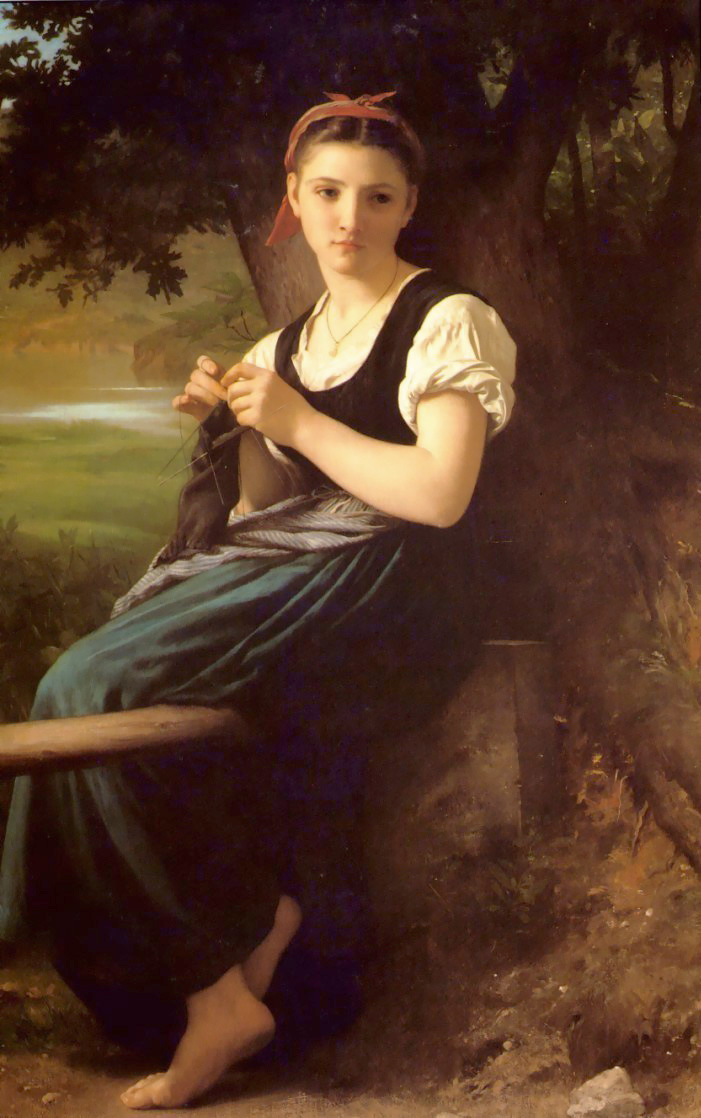
The Knitting Woman by William-Adolphe Bouguereau, 1869

Knitting is the process of using two or more needles to pull and loop yarn into a series of interconnected loops in order to create a finished garment or fabric. The word is derived from knot, thought to originate from the Dutch verb knutten, similar to the Old English cnyttan, "to knot". Its origins lie in the basic human need for clothing to protect one against the elements. More recently, hand-knitting has become less a necessary skill and more of a hobby.

== Origins of knitting ==
Knitting is a technique of producing fabric from a strand of yarn or wool. Unlike weaving, knitting does not require a loom or other large equipment, making it a valuable technique for nomadic and non-agrarian peoples.

The oldest knitted artifacts are socks from Egypt, dating from the 11th century. They are a very fine gauge, done with complex colourwork and some have a short row heel, which necessitates the purl stitch. These complexities suggest that knitting is even older than the archeological record can prove.

Earlier pieces having a knitted or crocheted appearance have been shown to be made with other techniques, such as Nålebinding, a technique of making fabric by creating multiple loops with a single needle and thread, much like sewing. Some artefacts have a structure so similar to knitting, for example, 3rd – 5th century CE Romano-Egyptian toe-socks, that it is thought the "Coptic stitch" of nalbinding is the forerunner to knitting.

== Early European knitting ==
Before the introduction of knitting into Europe, nålebinding was an ancient technique with a function similar to knitting and sewing, employed in Northern Europe to make sturdy items, such as socks, mittens and hats. The earliest known knitted items in Europe were made by Muslim knitters employed by Spanish Christian royal families. Their high level of knitting skill can be seen in several items found in the tombs in the Abbey of Santa María la Real de Las Huelgas, a royal monastery, near Burgos, Spain. Among them are the knitted cushion covers and gloves found in the tomb of Prince Fernando de la Cerda, who died in 1275. The silk cushion cover was knitted at approximately 20 stitches per inch. It included knitted patterns reflecting the family armoury, as well as the Arabic word baraka ("blessings") in stylized Kufic script. Numerous other knitted garments and accessories, also dating from the mid-13th century, have been found in cathedral treasuries in Spain.

There also is a Votic knitted fragment dated to late 13th century excavated in Estonia. This fragment is knitted in a stranded pattern in three colours and was likely part of a mitten cuff. Also, a wool mitten fragment from early 14th century has been found in Siksälä burial in South-Eastern Estonia.

Several paintings from Europe portray the Virgin Mary knitting and date from the 14th century, including Our Lady Knitting by Tommaso da Modena (circa 1325-1375) and Visit of the Angel, from the right wing of the Buxtehude Altar, 1400–10, by Master Bertram of Minden.

Archaeological finds from medieval cities all over Europe, such as London, Newcastle, Oslo, Amsterdam, Lübeck, and Tallinn as well as tax lists, prove the spread of knitted goods for everyday use from the 14th century onward. Like many archaeological textiles, most of the finds are only fragments of knitted items so that in most cases their former appearance and use is unknown. One of the exceptions is a 14th or 15th century woollen child's cap from Lübeck, and a cap fragment from beginning of 15th century from Tartu.

Although the purl stitch was used in some of the earliest knitted items in Egypt, its knowledge may have been lost in Europe. The first European purl stitches appear in the mid-16th century, in the red silk stockings in which Eleanora de Toledo, wife of Cosimo de Medici, was buried, and which also include the first lacy patterns made by yarn-overs, but the technique may have been developed slightly earlier. The English Queen Elizabeth I herself favoured silk stockings; these were finer, softer, more decorative and much more expensive than those of wool. Stockings reputed to have belonged to her still exist, demonstrating the high quality of the items specifically knitted for her. During this era the manufacture of stockings was of vast importance to many Britons, who knitted with fine wool and exported their wares. Knitting schools were established as a way of providing an income to the poor. The fashion of the period, requiring men to wear short trunks, made fitted stockings a fashion necessity. Stockings made in England were sent to the Netherlands, Spain and Germany.

Many elaborate designs were developed, such as the cable stitch used on Aran sweaters, which was developed in the early 20th century in Ireland.

== Importance in Scottish history ==
Knitting was such an important occupation among those living on the Scottish Isles during the 17th and 18th centuries that whole families were involved in making sweaters, accessories, socks, stockings, etc. Fair Isle techniques were used to create elaborate colourful patterns. Sweaters were essential garments for the fishermen of these islands because the natural oils within the wool provided some element of protection against the harsh weather encountered while out fishing.

== Industrial Revolution ==
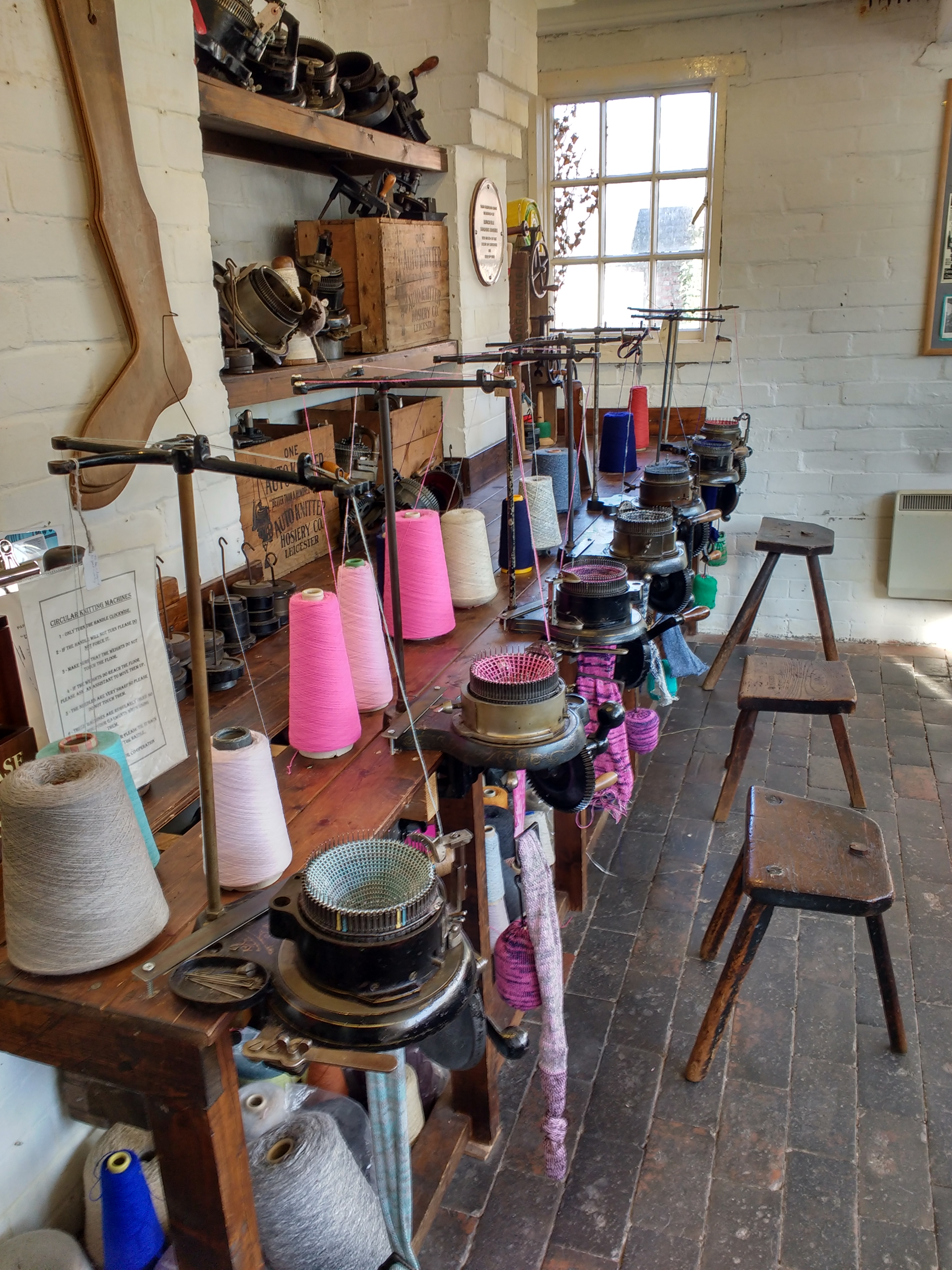
Griswold knitting machines at Ruddington Framework Knitters Museum

The stocking frame or the mechanical knitting machine was invented in 1589 by William Lee, an English clergyman. After receiving a pair of black stockings from William, Queen Elizabeth I ultimately declined to grant him a patent for his invention. However, France's King Henri IV saw the opportunity William's invention provided and offered him financial support. The inventor moved to Rouen where he built a stocking factory. Before long, the French spread the knitting loom throughout Europe. When the device came back to Great Britain, the Worshipful Company of Framework Knitters was incorporated in 1657 in London. Framework knitting was predominantly performed at home, often with the entire family participating.

The city of Nottingham, particularly the district known as Lace Market, was a major producer of machine-knitted lace. Leicestershire and neighbouring counties had long had an association with the hosiery industry. This continued particularly growing with the invention of portable circular knitting machines. Machines could be hired and worked from home rather than relying on a large stocking frame or the much slower hand knitting. One manufacturer of these machines was Henry Josiah Griswold, they were often called Griswold knitting machines, the design of this English sock machine originates from the British inventors, Hainsworth and Griswold.

Some framework knitters were among the Luddites, who resisted the transition to factories. By the middle of the nineteenth century, the knitting industry had still not made the transition to factories. With the improvement of steam-powered knitting machines in the mid-nineteenth century, machine knitting increasingly shifted to factories to accommodate the larger machines.

By the mid-nineteenth century, hand knitting was declining as part of the knitting industry but was increasing as a hobby. Printed knitting patterns and yarn were produced for leisure as well as for industrial use by authors such as Jane Gaugain.

== 1914-1918: Knitting for the war effort ==
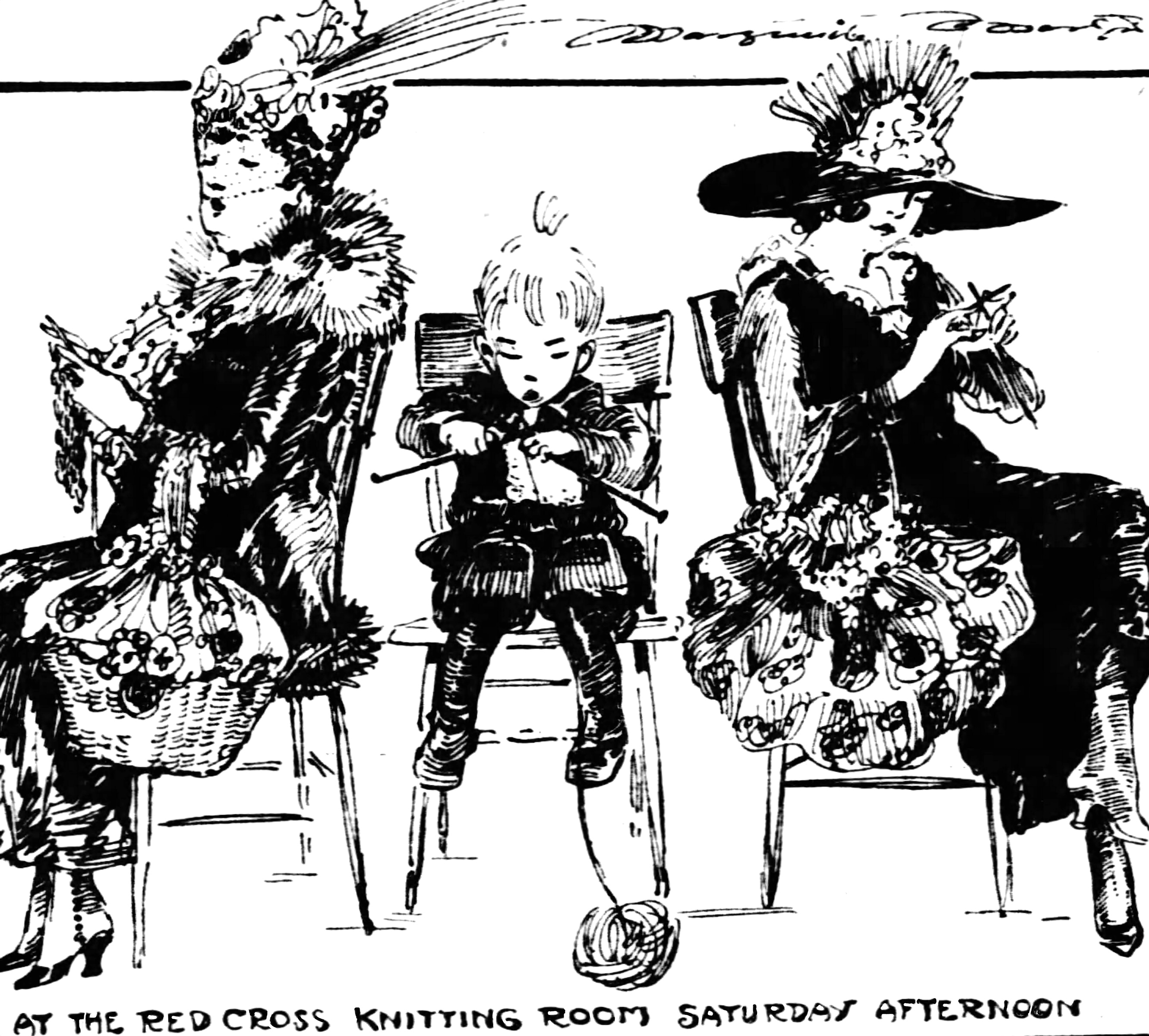
Drawing by Marguerite Martyn of two women and a child knitting for the war effort at a St. Louis, Missouri, Red Cross office in 1917

During World War I, men, women, and children knitted large quantities of clothing and accessories to help the war effort on the Allied side, supplementing the troop's uniforms with socks, hats, scarves, sweaters, mufflers, and balaclavas. Knitting and women's magazines along with the Red Cross published pamphlets and patterns specifically for sailors and troops. Popular magazines and songs treated knitting as a craze that had swept over Britain in the effort to support the military forces.

== 1920s: the Russian Civil Wars and China ==
After the White Russians' defeat in the Civil War, many units retreated into China's Xinjiang and were interned there. As China was about to descend into a civil war of its own, the Russian internees were transported by camel caravans to Eastern China. According to Owen Lattimore, it was then that they passed on the art of knitting to the Chinese caravan men, who had ready supply of camel hair from their animals. In 1926, Lattimore was able to observe camel-pullers "knitting on the march; if they ran out of yarn, they would reach back to the first camel of the file they were leading, pluck a handful of hair from the neck, and roll it in their palms into the beginning of a length of yarn; a weight was attached to this, and given a twist to start it spinning, and the man went on feeding wool into the thread until he had spun enough yarn to continue his knitting." This way the camel men not only provided themselves with warm camel-hair socks, but were able to make knitwear for sale as well.

== 1920s: Fashion ==
The 1920s saw a vast increase in the popularity of knitwear in much of the western world. Knitwear, especially sweaters/pullovers became an essential part of the new fashions of the age for men, women and children, rather than mostly practical garments often associated with particular occupations (e.g., fishermen). The late teens and early 1920s saw a fashion for knitted neckties. Knitwear was often associated with sport and leisure. Garments often became associated with particular sports; for example, white sweaters/pullers, often with coloured stripes (club colours) in the collar, became common for tennis and cricket.

Fair Isle knitting enjoyed a golden age during the 1920s, reputedly started by the Prince of Wales (future Edward VIII) wearing a Fair Isle pullover sweater to play golf. Both Fair Isle and Argyle styles have since been associated with the sport.

High fashion also embraced knitwear, with Coco Chanel making prominent use of it and Vogue magazine featuring patterns.

Before the 1920s, the majority of commercial knitting in the Western world had centred around production of underwear, socks and hosiery. This vastly expanded as the public taste for knitted fashion did also. Both hand and machine knitting were commercially active on a large scale prior to the Great Depression.

The 1920s saw a continuation in the growth of interest in home/hobby knitting which grew during the First World War. Conditions of trench warfare led to a shortage of socks in particular, and the Allied home front was encouraged to support the troops by knitting. Home knitting grew in popularity, especially as fashion fully embraced knitwear. Companies started, or expanded, to meet the demands of home knitters, producing patterns, yarn, and tools.

== 1930s: The Depression ==
The prominence of knitwear in fashion of the 1920s continued, but reflected the changes of fashion. Combining traditional methods in new ways became more common and new technologies such as zip fasteners began to be used in knitwear. New synthetic yarns started to become available.

The hardship experienced by many during the Great Depression meant some turned to knitting through necessity. It was much cheaper to knit your own garments than to buy hand (or even machine) knitted products. Skills were needed for repairs to existing garments, socks and underwear. Patterns, now often included in popular women's magazines frequently reflected this need. Socks with replaceable toes and heels were common. Some hobby knitters took to part-time work, hand-knitting for extra income.

The 1930s also saw a rise in the popularity of commercial machine knitting. Much commercially sold knitwear during the 1920s was hand-knitted, however the costs of this and other pressures of the time saw a large shift in consumers towards cheaper machine knitted products.

== 1939–1945: Knitting for victory ==
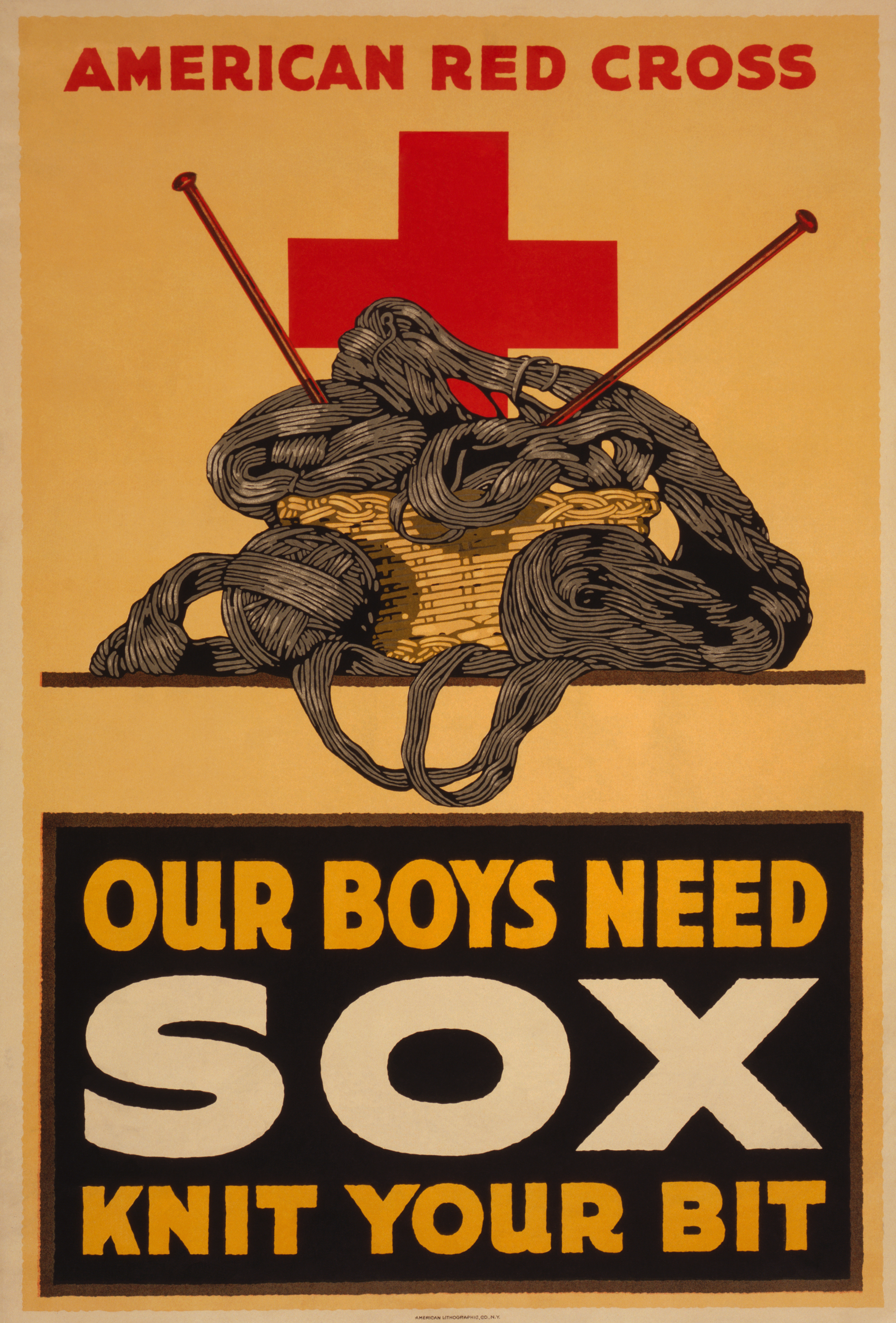
World War I poster encouraging people to knit socks for the troops

Make do and mend was the title of a booklet produced by the British wartime government department, the Ministry of Information. Wool was in very short supply, and the booklet encouraged women to unpick old unwearable woollen items in order to reuse the wool.

Hand-knitting reached its peak during World War II following the encouragement to knit for the war efforts. Knitting patterns were issued so that people could make items for the Army and Navy to wear in winter, such as balaclavas and gloves. This not only produced the much-needed items but also gave those on the "home front" a positive sense of contributing to the war effort.

== 1950s and 60s: High fashion ==
After the war years, knitting had a huge boost as greater colours and styles of yarn were introduced. Many thousands of patterns fed a market hungry for fashionable designs in bright colours. The twinset was an extremely popular combination for the home knitter. It consisted of a short-sleeved top with a long-sleeved cardigan in the same colour, to be worn together.

Girls were taught to knit in school, as it was thought to be a useful skill, not just a hobby. Magazines such as Pins and Needles in the UK carried patterns of varying difficulty including not just clothes, but also blankets, toys, bags, lace curtains and other items that could be sold for profit.

== 1980s decline ==
The popularity of knitting showed a sharp decline during this period in the Western world. Sales of patterns and yarns slumped, as the craft was increasingly seen as old-fashioned and children were rarely taught to knit in school.

The increased availability and low cost of machine-knitted items meant that consumers could have a sweater at the same cost of purchasing the wool and pattern themselves, or often for far less.

Alternatives to traditional woollen knitwear gained in popularity, such as tracksuits and sweatshirts, which began to be worn as everyday wear rather than only in a sporting context. Sewn from a micro-knit synthetic fabric and brushed on one side, these were more fashionable at the time, produced more cheaply and quickly and easier for consumers to care for. These fabrics could also easily be printed with fashionable designs. Although made from a kind of knit fabric they are not usually considered knitwear.

These new garments, along with trends away from formality in clothing meant traditional knitwear was no longer seen as sportswear as it had been in the 1920s. Knitwear became more associated with "smart casual" wear.

Technological advances such as computerised knitting machines saw new designs and approaches to knitting. Some artists began to see knitting as a legitimate art form rather than a craft or cottage industry, and more attention was placed on the design possibilities of knitting from an artistic perspective rather than just fashionable or practical approaches.

== 1990s ==
By the late 1980s, many of the suppliers to the home knitting market had disappeared or been absorbed into other companies, while local wool shops suffered a marked reduction in numbers. However, home knitting still had a strong and loyal following.

The growth of craft fairs, release of well researched books on many aspects of knitting and the continued support among those who had learnt the skill in the heyday of the 60s and 70s kept a considerable amount of interest in knitting alive.

One of the most influential changes was the spread of the internet, which enabled knitters to share advice, patterns and experience, but also it meant that home knitters had direct access to supplies rather being reliant on local sources. These trends have continued.

== Early 21st century revival ==
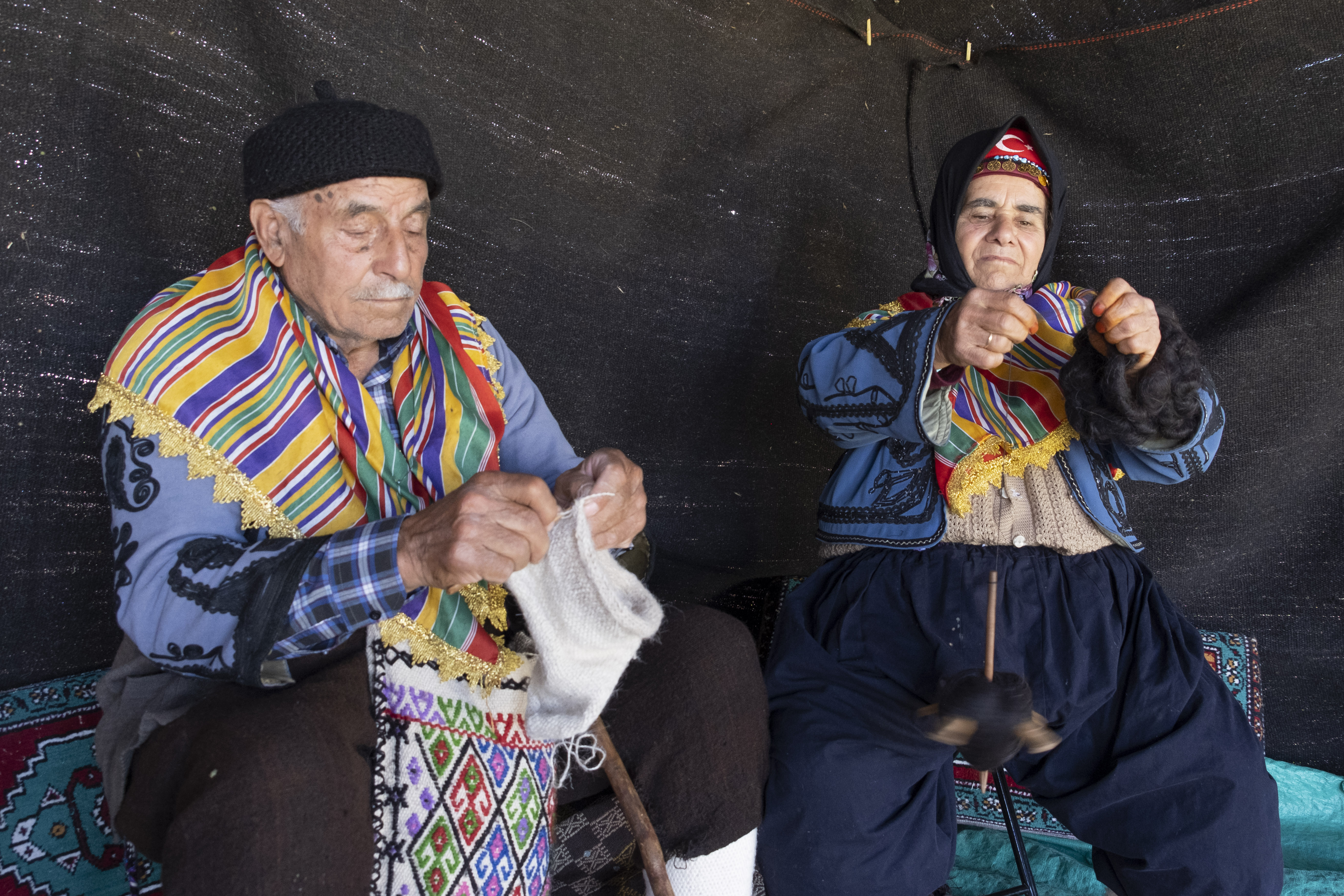
Hand-knitting has always been popular among rural people of Türkiye

The 21st century has seen a resurgence of knitting. This resurgence coincided with the growth of the internet, as well as the general "Handmade Revolution" and interest in DIY crafts.

Natural fibers from animals, such as alpaca, angora and merino and plant fibres, chiefly cotton, have become easier and less costly to collect and process and therefore more widely available. Exotic fibres, such as silk, bamboo, yak and qiviut are growing in popularity as well. The yarn industry has started to make novelty yarns, which produce stunning results without years of knitting experience. Designers have begun to create patterns which work up quickly on large needles, a phenomenon known as instant-gratification knitting.

Celebrities including Julia Roberts, Winona Ryder, Dakota Fanning, and Cameron Diaz have been seen knitting and have helped to popularize the revival of the craft. There has also been a return by men to the art of knitting — one illustration being the role models in the designer partnership of Arne Nerjordet & Carlos Zachrison, and another the publication of books aimed at a male readership.

As time and technology change, so does the art of knitting. The internet allows knitters to connect, share interests and learn from each other, whether across the street or across the globe. Among the first internet knitting phenomena was the popular KnitList, with thousands of members. In 1998, the first online knitting magazine, KnitNet, began publishing. (It suspended publication with its 54th edition in 2009.) Blogging later added fuel to the development of an international knitting community.

Patterns from both print and online sources have inspired groups (known as knit-a-longs, or KALs) centered on knitting a specific pattern. Knitting podcasts have also emerged, with much cross-pollination of ideas from blogs, 'zines, and knitting books. Traditional designs and techniques that had been preserved by a relatively small number of hand-knitters are now finding a wider audience as well.

In addition, a type of graffiti called yarn bombing, has spread worldwide. Like traditional graffiti, this consists of creating knitted pieces in public spaces without permission.

On 14 January 2006, author and knit-blogger Stephanie Pearl-McPhee, otherwise known as Yarn Harlot, challenged the knitting world to participate in the 2006 Knitting Olympics. To participate, a knitter committed to casting-on a challenging project during the opening ceremonies of the 2006 Winter Olympics in Turin, and to have that project finished by the time the Olympic flame was extinguished sixteen days later. By the first day of the Olympics, almost 4,000 knitters had risen to the challenge.

As another sign of the knitting's popularity in the early 21st century, a large international online community and social networking site for knitters and crocheters, Ravelry, was founded by Cassidy and Jessica Forbes in May 2007. At first available by invitation only, the site connects knitting and crochet enthusiasts around the world and, as of May 2016 had over 6.21 million registered users.

== See also ==
- History of knitwear
- Row counter
- Jersey (fabric)
