= Charles Benazech =

English painter

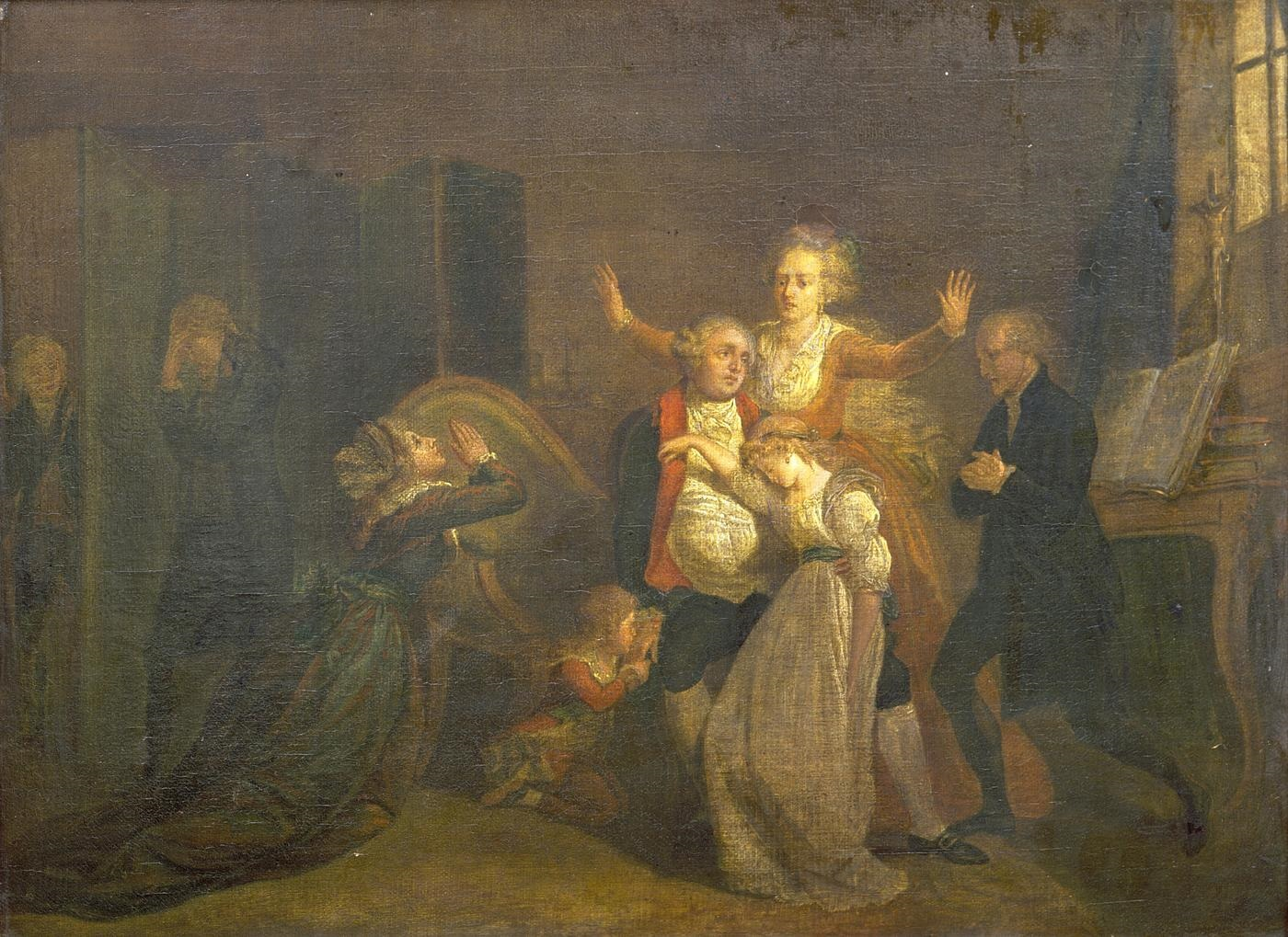
The last interview between Louis XVI and his family (1793)

Charles Benazech (1767/68 – 1794) was an English portrait and historical painter, and aquatint engraver. Prints of his painting of Louis XVI and family, just before the monarch's execution during the French Revolution, achieved a wide circulation.

== Life and work ==
Benazach was born in London around 1767, the son of Peter Paul Benazech. In 1782, at the age of fifteen, he went to Rome, and on his return stayed for a time in Paris, where he studied under Greuze, and witnessed the outbreak of the French Revolution. This eventful period furnished him with the subjects of four pictures by which he became known: The Address of Louis XVI at the Bar of the National Convention, The Separation of Louis XVI from his Family, The last Interview between Louis XVI and his Family and Louis XVI ascending the Scaffold. These were engraved by Luigi Schiavonetti.

He also painted The last Interview between Charles I and his Children engraved by Thomas Gaugain, as well as some subjects from the poets and several good portraits. He was a member of the Florentine Academy, and exhibited at the Royal Academy in London in the years 1790 and 1791. He likewise engraved a few plates in aquatint, including the Couronnement de la Rosiere, in which he attempted to imitate the style of Philibert-Louis Debucourt, and also some portraits after himself, as well as two of Henry IV, king of France, and Sully, after Pourbus, which are signed with the fictitious name of Frieselheim.

Benezach died in London in the summer of 1794, aged just 27 years.
