= Max Schnapp =

Max Schnapp (1905 – January 10, 1995) was a German-born animal and labor rights activist.

== Biography ==
Schnapp was born in Austria-Hungary in a German family. He began his career by joining the Socialist Party.

In 1923, Schnapp moved to the United States and started to work as a knitting machine mechanic.

While working for the International Ladies Garment Workers Union in the 1930s, he conducted strikes and mobilized factory employees. During the Great Depression, he was a member of the International Workers Order and taught displaced tenants how to organize in the face of eviction and homelessness.

In 1970, Schnapp co-founded the Pet Owners Protection Association along with Paula Asch and served as its president. He was also a member of the Sierra Club.
