= Stephanie Pearl-McPhee =

Canadian writer and knitter (born 1968)

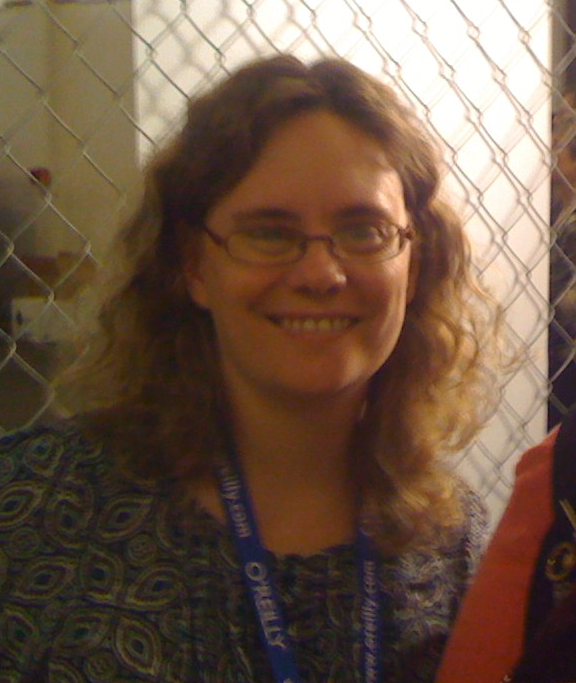
- Stephanie Pearl-McPhee at Maker Faire (San Mateo, 2008)
- Born: Stephanie Anne Pearl-McPhee; June 14, 1968 (age 58)
- Occupations: Writer, knitting teacher, blogger, doula
- Writing career
- Pen name: The Yarn Harlot

Stephanie Anne Pearl-McPhee, also known as the Yarn Harlot (born June 14, 1968) is a writer, knitter, International Board Certified Lactation Consultant (IBCLC), and doula living in Toronto, Ontario, Canada.

== Life ==
Pearl-McPhee's grandmother, a professional knitter, taught her to knit when she was four years old. She has three daughters. Her husband, Joe, is a record producer.

== Work ==
Tricoteuses sans Frontières (Knitters without Borders) logo.

Pearl-McPhee has written eight books on knitting. She has contributed articles and patterns to knitting magazines such as Cast On, Interweave Knits, Knitty, Stranded, and Spin-Off. She contributed a chapter to the book Knitlit Too. Pearl-McPhee has said that she started writing about knitting when she lost her hospital job "support[ing] birth and breast-feeding" because of the 2002–2004 SARS outbreak among healthcare workers. She has been described as a knitting humourist, and has called her own writing "knitting humor". She has said of her writing "I believe knitting is a transformative and intriguing act that can change the life and brain of the person doing it, and that knitting is a perfect metaphor for life and insight into some better ways through it".

Pearl-McPhee is known for her blog, "The Yarn Harlot". In 2004, she founded Tricoteuses sans Frontières (Knitters without Borders), a group dedicated to raising money for the non-profit Médecins Sans Frontières (Doctors without Borders). As of the 6th anniversary of Pearl-McPhee's blog (January 2010), they have contributed over $1,000,000 CAD to MSF/DWB.

Pearl-McPhee has protested against cuts to library services.

In 2006, she started the Knitting Olympics, a competition for knitters to start and finish one challenging project during the timeframe of the 2006 Winter Olympics. Over 4,000 knitters worldwide participated.

Pearl-McPhee originated the word kinnear on August 2, 2007, on her blog. Now cited in the Urban Dictionary and in The New York Times' 2007 Word in Review, it is defined as "kinnear v. To take a candid photograph surreptitiously, especially by holding the camera low and out of the line of sight." Kinnearing was originated when she attempted to take a picture of Greg Kinnear at an airport while on her way to Boston, MA. When Kinnear learned of this, he started to try kinnearing others, including his Flash of Genius costar, Alan Alda. He showed his attempts on Late Night with Conan O'Brien, where, in the same interview, he declared that Pearl-McPhee is "the Michael Jordan of knitting."

== Books ==
- Knitlit Too (contributor), 2004, ISBN 1400051495
- Yarn Harlot: The Secret Life of a Knitter, 2005, ISBN 0740750372
- At Knit's End: Meditations for Women Who Knit Too Much, 2005, ISBN 1580175899
- Knitting Rules!: The Yarn Harlot's Bag of Knitting Tricks, 2006, ISBN 1580178340
- Stephanie Pearl-McPhee Casts Off: The Yarn Harlot's Guide to the Land of Knitting, 2007, ISBN 9781580176583
- Things I Learned from Knitting (Whether I Wanted To or Not), 2008, ISBN 9781603420624
- Free-Range Knitter: The Yarn Harlot Writes Again, 2008, ISBN 0740769472
- All Wound Up, 2011, ISBN 0740797573
- The Amazing Thing About the Way It Goes: Stories of Tidiness, Self-Esteem and Other Things I Gave Up On, 2014, ISBN 1449437087
