= Jane Gaugain =

Scottish author, knitter, and fancy needleworker

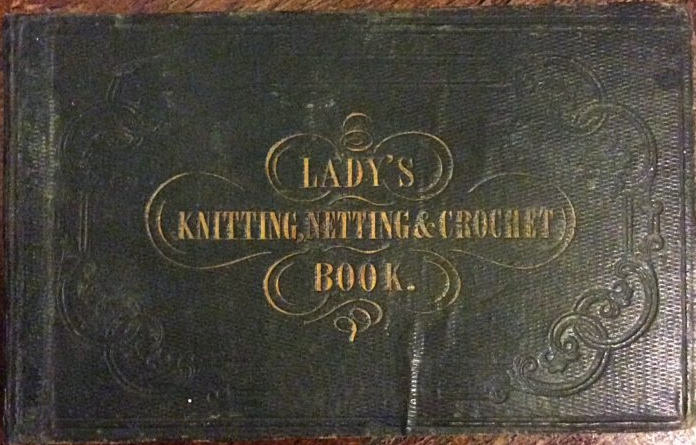
- her 1840 book
- Born: Jane Alison; 26 March 1804; Dalkeith, Scotland
- Died: 20 May 1860 (aged 56); Leith, Scotland
- Known for: Textiles
- Spouse: J. J. Gaugain

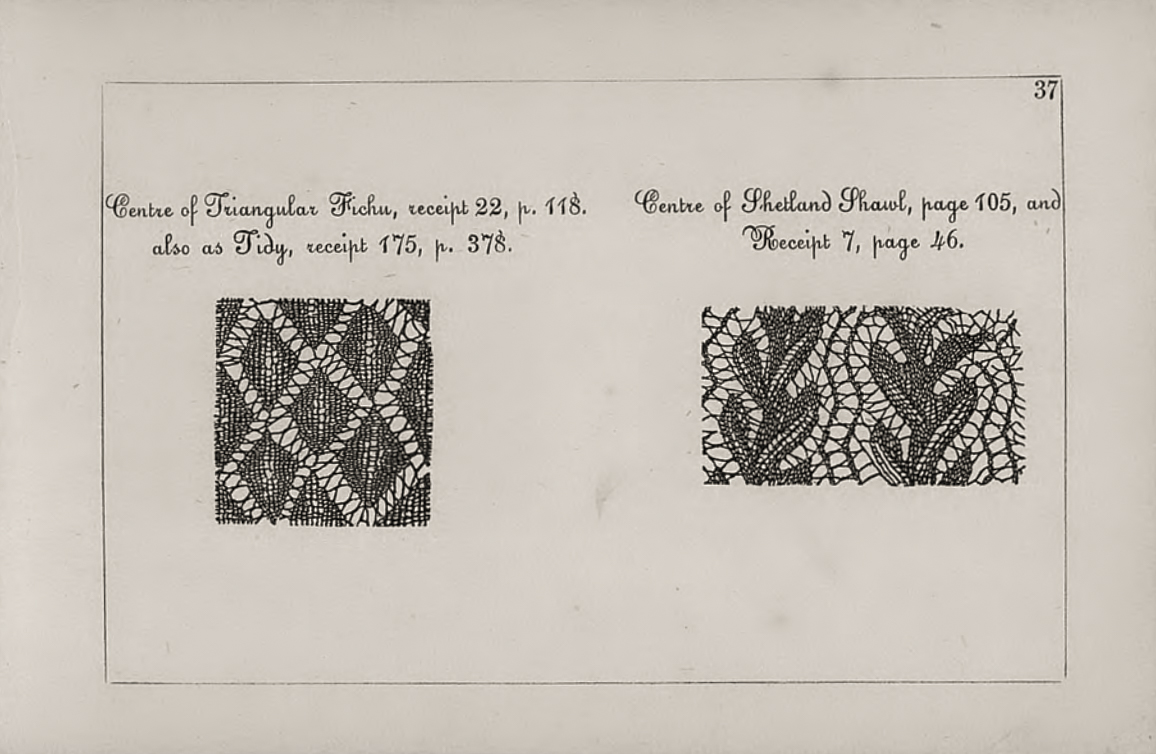
Knitting motifs published by Jane Gaugain, 1845

Jane Gaugain (née Alison) (26 March 1804 – 20 May 1860) was a Scottish knitter and writer. She built up a successful business in Edinburgh, and published 16 volumes on knitting that helped to make it a popular pastime for ladies and a source of income for lower classes of women. Her unusually written pattern books are important in the history of textiles in Scotland.

== Early life ==
Jane (sometimes Jean) Alison was born on 26 March 1804 in Dalkeith, Midlothian, one of 12 children born to Elizabeth (née McLairain/McLaren) (died 1824) and James Alison (1775–1846). Her father was a tailor and clothier, appointed as a Scottish contractor in ordinary to King William IV, and was a burgess of Edinburgh.

She married English cloth importer John James Gaugain (known as James or J. J.), son of engraver Thomas Gaugain on 16 November 1823 at St Andrew's Church in Edinburgh. She worked in her husband's shop at 63 George Street and helped turn it into a thriving haberdashery.

== Career ==
Gaugain wrote and disseminated knitting patterns throughout the 1830s from her shop and published her first pattern book in 1840. It was called "Lady's Assistant in Knitting, Netting and Crochet." She had a particular way of writing her patterns with full instructions at the beginning detailing the meanings of abbreviations. The book was very popular, (Note: Online editions of the book exist. For the first edition of the book, see Gaugain 1840; for the 1842 fifth edition of the book, see Gaugain (5th ed.) 1842.) reaching a wide audience in the UK and America and being the best-selling knitting book of the period; it ran to 22 editions. Throughout the 1840s and 1850s, she published a great many titles. In response to readers' feedback, she began to produce charted paper and instructions that allowed knitters to create their own designs and began accepting mail orders at the Edinburgh shop.

== Personal life ==
Jane and J. J. Gaugain had nine children, six of whom lived to adulthood. Their youngest son, Charles (1836 – c. 1860) became a sergeant in the East India Company, and he and their youngest daughter, Rosetta Hester Malcolm (1842–1908), survived her.

Jane Gaugain died on 20 May 1860 from phthisis pulmonalis (tuberculosis) and is buried in Edinburgh's Dean Cemetery near the Water of Leith.

== Legacy ==
In 2012, knitter Franklin Habit adapted one of Jane Gaugain's patterns, a pineapple-shaped purse, for a modern audience in the summer 2012 issue of Knitty. Knitters today continue to use and be inspired by Jane Gaugain's patterns, and she is beginning to be recognised as an 'unsung hero' of the history of women entrepreneurs and knitting.

The Oxford Dictionary of National Biography published an entry on Gaugain in August 2024, alongside another needlewoman Letitia Higgin (1837–1913).

== Selected works ==
- Gaugain, Jane (1840). The Lady's Assistant for Executing Useful and Fancy Designs in Knitting, Netting, and Crochet Work (PDF). Edinburgh: I. J. Gaugain.
- Gaugain, Jane (1842). The Lady's Assistant in Knitting, Netting, and Crochet Work (second volume). Edinburgh; I. J. Gaugain; London: Ackermann and Co.
- Gaugain, Jane (1842). The Lady's Assistant for Executing Useful and Fancy Designs in Knitting, Netting, and Crochet Work (PDF) (5th ed.). Edinburgh: I. J. Gaugain; London: Ackermann and Co.
- Gaugain, Jane (c. 1843). Mrs. Gaugain's Miniature Knitting, Netting, and Crochet Book (seventh thousand; some pages out of order) (PDF). Edinburgh: I. J. Gaugain; London: Ackermann and Co.
- Gaugain, Jane (1845). The Lady's Assistant for Executing Useful and Fancy Designs in Knitting, Netting, and Crochet Work (eighth thousand). Edinburgh: I. J. Gaugain; London: Ackermann and Co.
- Gaugain, Jane (1845). The Accompaniment to Second Volume of Mrs Gaugain's Work on Knitting, Netting and Crochet, Illustrating the Open Patterns and Stitches; To Which are Added Several Elegant and New Receipts (Third thousand). Edinburgh: I. J. Gaugain; London: Ackermann and Co.
- Gaugain, Jane (1846). The Knitters' Friend: Being a Selection of Receipts for the Most Useful and Saleable Articles in Knitting, Netting and Crochet work (second thousand) (PDF). Edinburgh: J. Gaugain; London: Ackermann and Co.
- Gaugain, Jane (1847). Mrs. Gaugain's Knit Polka Book (PDF). Edinburgh: I. J. Gaugain; London: Ackermann and Co.
