= Thomas Gaugain =

English engraver (1756–1831)

- Born: John Thomas Gaugain; 1756; Soho, London
- Died: 3 October 1831 (aged 74–75); Edinburgh
- Occupation: engraver
- Relatives: Peter John Gaugain (1762-1813), brother Philip August Gaugain, son - portraiture painter c 1820s-1830s, Jane Gaugain (1804-1860), daughter-in-law - author of knitting and needlework books

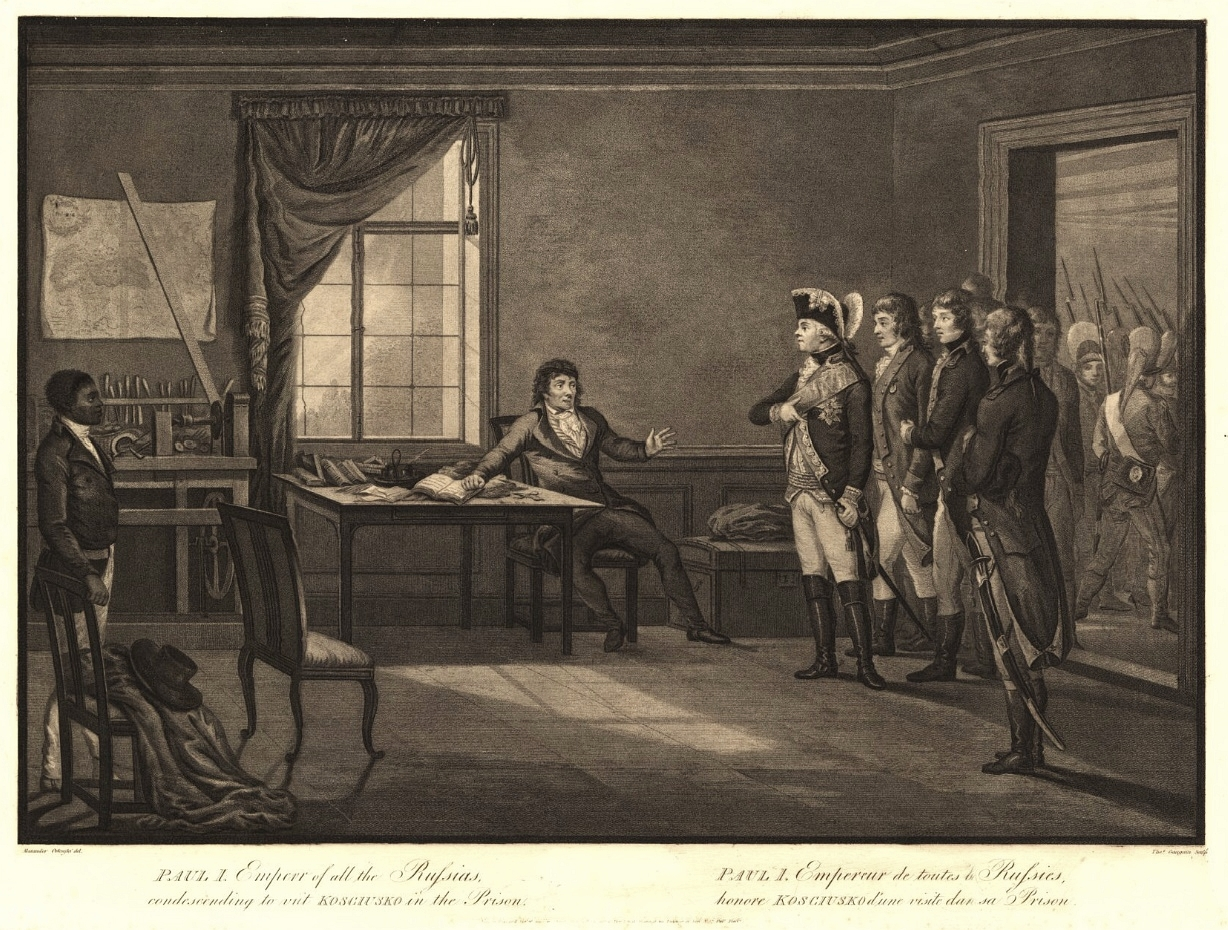
Tsar Paul I visiting Tadeusz Kościuszko in prison by Thomas Gaugain after Aleksander Orłowski, 1801, National Library of Poland

(John) Thomas Gaugain (1756–1831) was a successful British stipple-engraver.

== Life ==
Gaugain was said to be born at Abbeville in France in 1756, but more recent research indicates that he was baptised as John Thomas Gaugain in April 1756 at St Anne's church in London's, Soho. His parents were Mary Anne (born Malherbe) and Philip John Gaugain.

He studied at the Royal Academy and engraving under Richard Houston. He began his artistic career as a painter, and exhibited in 1778 at the Royal Academy, showing A Moravian Peasant, The Shepherdess of the Alps, and a portrait. He continued to exhibit there up to 1782. He married his sister -in-law Mariane Ame Le Cointe on 17 June 1787. The union had issue of two sons and two daughters including Phillip Augustus Gaugain, a portrait painter.

After 1779 he devoted himself principally to engraving, using the stipple method, and engraving some of his own designs. He showed four of these, printed in colours – Annette, Lubin, May-day, and The Chimney Sweeper's Garland– at the exhibition of the Free Society of Artists in 1783. Gaugain lived for some years at 4 Little Compton Street, Soho, London before relocating to Edinburgh where he is listed as a portrait engraver at 14 Waterloo Place (1824–25) and at 58 George Street (1826–27).

Gaugain's print after Joshua Reynolds of James Beattie in William Forbes' account of his life was much advertised in Scottish newspapers in 1806 and may have encouraged Gauguin to move to Edinburgh. His print of members of the Scottish bench and bar after Benjamin William Crombie was advertised in the Glasgow Herald of 24 February 1826, but he was chiefly in business as a lace merchant with his son John James until his death aged 75 'of old age' on 3 October 1831 at 3 Leslie Place, Stockbridge, Edinburgh. John James married Jane Alison in Edinburgh and as his wife - Jane Gaugain - she helped establish and grow the family business and would become a noted author of knitting and needlework instruction books.

== Works (non-comprehensive) ==
- Diana and her Nymphs, after William Taverner
- The Officers and Men saved from the Wreck of the Centaur, after James Northcote
- Lady Caroline Manners, after Sir Joshua Reynolds
- The Death of Prince Leopold of Brunswick, after James Northcote
- Mary Queen of Scots receiving from Lord Buckhurst & Beale the sentence of Death, after Thomas Stothard (in V & A collection)
- The Last Interview of Charles I with his Children, after Charles Benazech
- Diligence and Dissipation, a set of ten engravings after James Northcote
- Rural Contemplation, after Richard Westall
- The Madonna, after W. Miller
- Warren Hastings, from a bust by Thomas Banks
- Charles James Fox, from a bust by Joseph Nollekens
- Lieut.-Col. Disbrowe, after Thomas Barker
- Dr James Beattie, after Joshua Reynolds

Also, numerous others after William Hamilton (1751–1801), William Redmore Bigg, George Morland, Joseph Barney, John Milbourn, Maria Cosway, and others.
