= Peter Paul Benazech =

British engraver

Peter Paul Benazech (1744? - 1783?) was a British engraver.

== Life and work ==
Benazech is said to have been born in London about the year 1744. He was a pupil of François Vivares, and worked as a draughtsman and engraver both in London and in Paris. His engravings are mostly of landscapes and marine subjects, the best being those after Dietrich and Vernet.

He also engraved a series of anatomical plates, a set of seven scenes from the Seven Years' War, and, in conjunction with Pierre-Charles Canot, four plates of engagements between the English and French fleets, after Francis Swaine. Besides these he engraved Peasants playing at Bowls after Adriaen van Ostade, and views in England after Chatelain and Brooks.

The year of his death is not known, but his latest dated plate is "The Tomb of Virgil" after Hugh Dean, engraved in 1783. His son, Charles Benazech, was a notable portrait and history painter.

=== Notable engravings ===
- Peasants playing at Bowls; after Adriaen van Ostade.
- Fishermen; after Vernet.
- Return from fishing (after Vernet).
- A Calm at Sea (after Vernet).
- Morning (after Vernet).
- Four large landscapes (after Dietrich - engraved in 1770 and 1771).
- The Calm (after Pierre Antoine Patel)
