= William Lee (inventor) =

English clergyman and inventor (1563–1614)

William Lee (1563–1614) was an English inventor and alleged clergyman who invented the stocking frame knitting machine. (Note: Day & McNeil 2002, p. 735 point out that there is no evidence that Lee was a clergyman. Hills 1989 also doubts much of what is recorded about Lee's life and history, but that he invented the framework stocking knitter in 1589 is not in doubt) Framework knitting, as the use of Lee's machine in stocking production was called, was the first major stage in the mechanisation of the textile industry, a process that 200 years later precipitated the Industrial Revolution.

== Life and legend ==
Some say Lee was born in Sussex, but others claim the Nottinghamshire villages of Calverton or Woodborough. No definitive evidence has been found for either of these although there is circumstantial support for Nottinghamshire. He entered Christ's College, Cambridge in 1579 as a sizar and graduated from St. John's College in 1582.

== Stocking frame knitting machine ==
The following popular stories surrounding Lee and the stocking frame are rejected by modern scholarship. Lee was a curate at Calverton when he is said to have developed the machine because a woman whom he was courting showed more interest in knitting than in him (or alternatively that his wife was a very slow knitter). His first machine produced a coarse wool, for stockings. Refused a patent by Queen Elizabeth I, he built an improved machine that increased the number of needles per inch from 8 to 20 and produced a silk of finer texture, but the queen again denied him a patent because of her concern for the employment security of the kingdom's many hand knitters whose livelihood might be threatened by such mechanization. The queen said to Lee: "Thou aimest high, Master Lee. Consider thou what the invention could do to my poor subjects. It would assuredly bring to them ruin by depriving them of employment, thus making them beggars." Supposedly, the Queen’s concern was a manifestation of the hosiers’ guilds' fear that the invention would make the skills of its artisan members obsolete. This alleged account of events does not appear until the 19th century and, as such, is dismissed by modern historians.

He entered into a partnership agreement with one George Brooke on 6 June 1600, but the unfortunate Brooks was arrested on a charge of treason and executed in 1603. Eventually, he moved to France with his brother James, taking 9 workmen and 9 frames. He found better support from the Huguenot Henry IV of France, who granted him a patent. Lee began stocking manufacture in Rouen, France, and prospered until, shortly before Henry's assassination in 1610, he signed a contract with Pierre de Caux to provide knitting machines for the manufacture of silk and wool stockings in 1614 and that is his last known record.

After Lee's death, his workers and probably his brother James returned to England and disposed of most of the frames in London before moving to Thoroton, near Nottingham where Lee's apprentice John Aston (or Ashton), a miller, had continued to work on the frame and produced a number of improvements. This led to the establishment of two knitting centres, one in London and one in Nottingham. During the 18th century Leicester vied with Nottingham for leadership of the industry in the English East Midlands.

Although the industry took nearly a century to develop in wool, silk and lace, the machinery that he developed remained the backbone for far longer and this is reflected in his appearance in the coat of arms of The Worshipful Company of Framework Knitters.

External image
- Coat of arms of The Worshipful Company of Framework Knitters

The quatercentenary of the invention was celebrated in 1989 with the publication Four Centuries of Machine Knitting: Commemorating William Lee's Invention of the Stocking Frame in 1589, a book of historical studies on the evolution of knitting technologies and the history of the knitting economy.
