= Pourbus =

Pourbus is a family name, often referring to a family of Flemish painters:

- Pieter Pourbus (1523–1584)
  - Frans Pourbus the Elder (1545–1581), his son
    - Frans Pourbus the younger, also known as Frans II (1569–1622), his son
