= Walter Golaski =

American engineer (1913–1996)

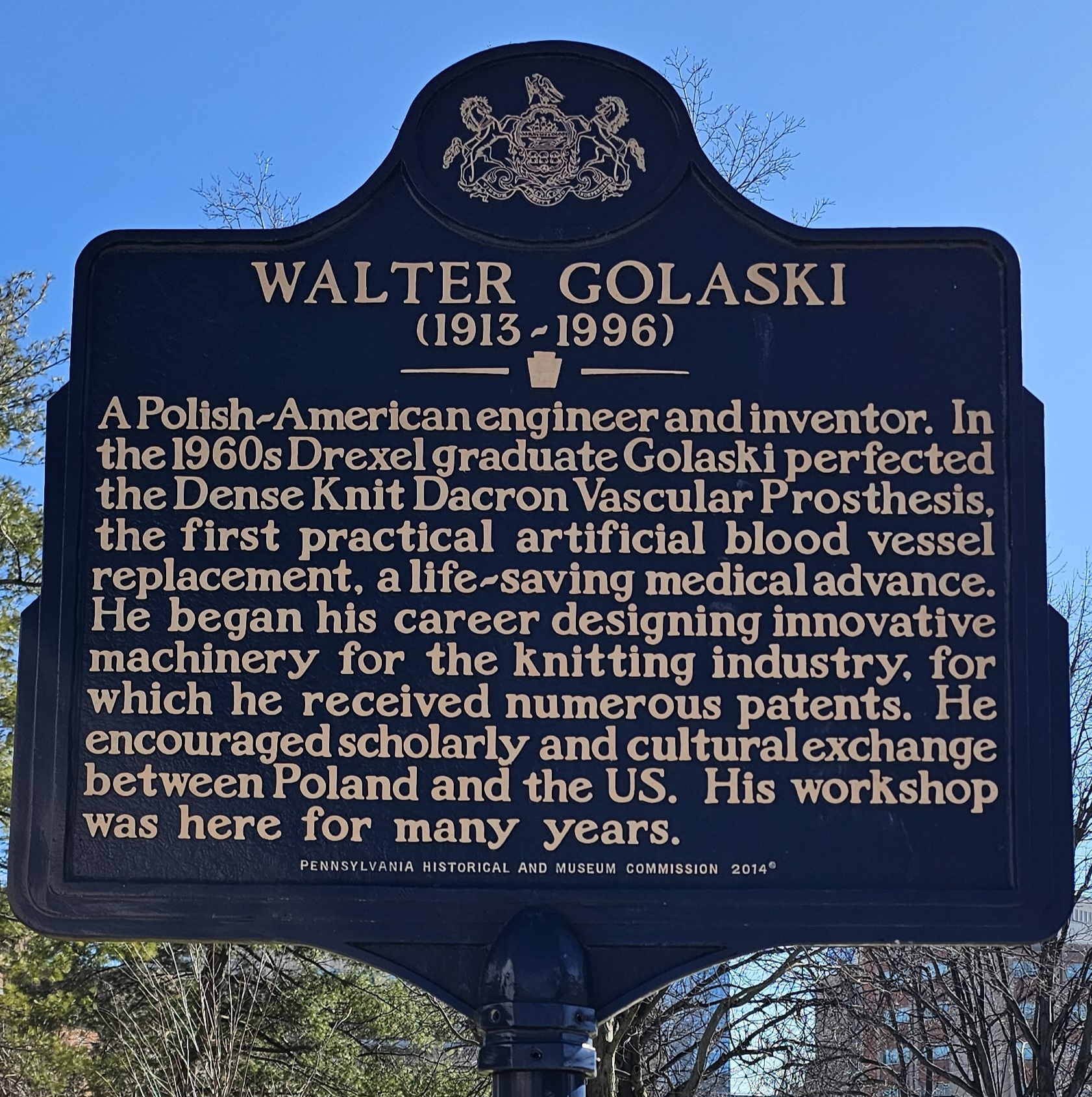
- A Pennsylvania state historical marker for Golaski in Philadelphia, located on Lancaster Walk on Drexel University's campus
- Born: Walter Michael Golaszewski; 12 August 1913; Torrington, Connecticut, United States
- Died: 22 September 1996 (aged 83)
- Education: Drexel University (1946)
- Occupation: Medical engineer
- Known for: Dense Knit Dacron Vascular Prostheses
- Spouse(s): Helene Dolores Ambrose (1942–1968); Alexandra Budna
- Children: 4

Walter Michael Golaski (12 August 1913 – 22 September 1996) was an American Mechanical-Bio-Medical Engineer best known for developing Dense Knit Dacron Vascular Prostheses, which were the first practical artificial blood vessel replacements. Golaski died near Philadelphia in 1996 at the age of 83.

== Early life and education ==
Golaski was born in Torrington, Connecticut in 1913 to Paul (né Golaszewski) and Helena (née Kulesza). His parents emigrated to the United States in 1906 from "Golasie", a village in Poland. He had 5 siblings: Stephina, Tessie, Edmond, Edward, and Julius. At 16, during the Great Depression, he took a job as a needle mechanic at the Torrington Company, a knitting needle manufacturer, where he soon developed new ideas for the automatic needle manufacturing industry. In 1939, Torrington transferred him to Philadelphia and promoted him to manager, and he enrolled in Drexel University's Mechanical Engineering evening school. He graduated in 1946; Drexel later honored him with many alumni awards.

== Inventions ==
In 1940, Golaski developed a process for rebuilding hosiery machines to enable the knitting industry to make the switch from silk to nylon. In 1945 he opened the Bearing Products Company and with the profits later in 1956 bought and reorganized the Overbrook Knitting Corporation in order to convert existing machinery to produce full fashioned knitted sweaters. He was granted 10 American, 1 British and 2 Canadian patents.

Golaski is best known for the product he developed next, the densely knit Dacron arteries, which he sold through his company Golaski Laboratories. Until this invention, the available replacement blood vessels were stiff, woven, and not sufficiently porous. The Golaski graft offered patients longer life expectancy than any other on the market.

Golaski's business flourished after his invention. He served as Chairman of the Kosciuszko Foundation, in "which [he] encouraged the exchange of students and scholars between the United States and Poland." He helped show Poland in a positive light to America in that "Americans of all ethnic backgrounds were encouraged to participate in the Foundation's programs and experience Polish culture directly."

== Personal life ==
In 1942, Golaski married Helene Dolores Ambrose, (1915-1968). They had a daughter, Michelle Starr Helen. In her memory, he donated a painting, Young Lady at the Fireplace (Wladyslaw Czachorski, 1882) to the Kosciusko Foundation. He later married Alexandra Budna Golaski with whom he had three children, Alexandra, Johnpaul, and Edmund. His son, Johnpaul is a freelance sound mixer for the film industry.

== Legacy ==
On May 17, 2014, a historical marker was erected on Lancaster Walk in honor of Golaski, commemorating his achievement in medical engineering,
