= Knitty =

Online knitting magazine

Knitty.com is an online knitting magazine, founded and edited by Amy Sadler (née Singer) and published quarterly since fall 2002.

Knitty Magazine publishes tech-edited knitting and crochet patterns, and articles on knitting and crochet techniques and skills. "Judy's Magic Cast On", a toe-up technique for knitting socks, was first published in Knitty.
