= Knitting machine =

Device used to create knitted fabrics

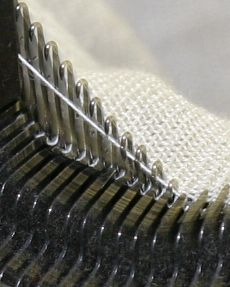
A modern industrial knitting machine in action

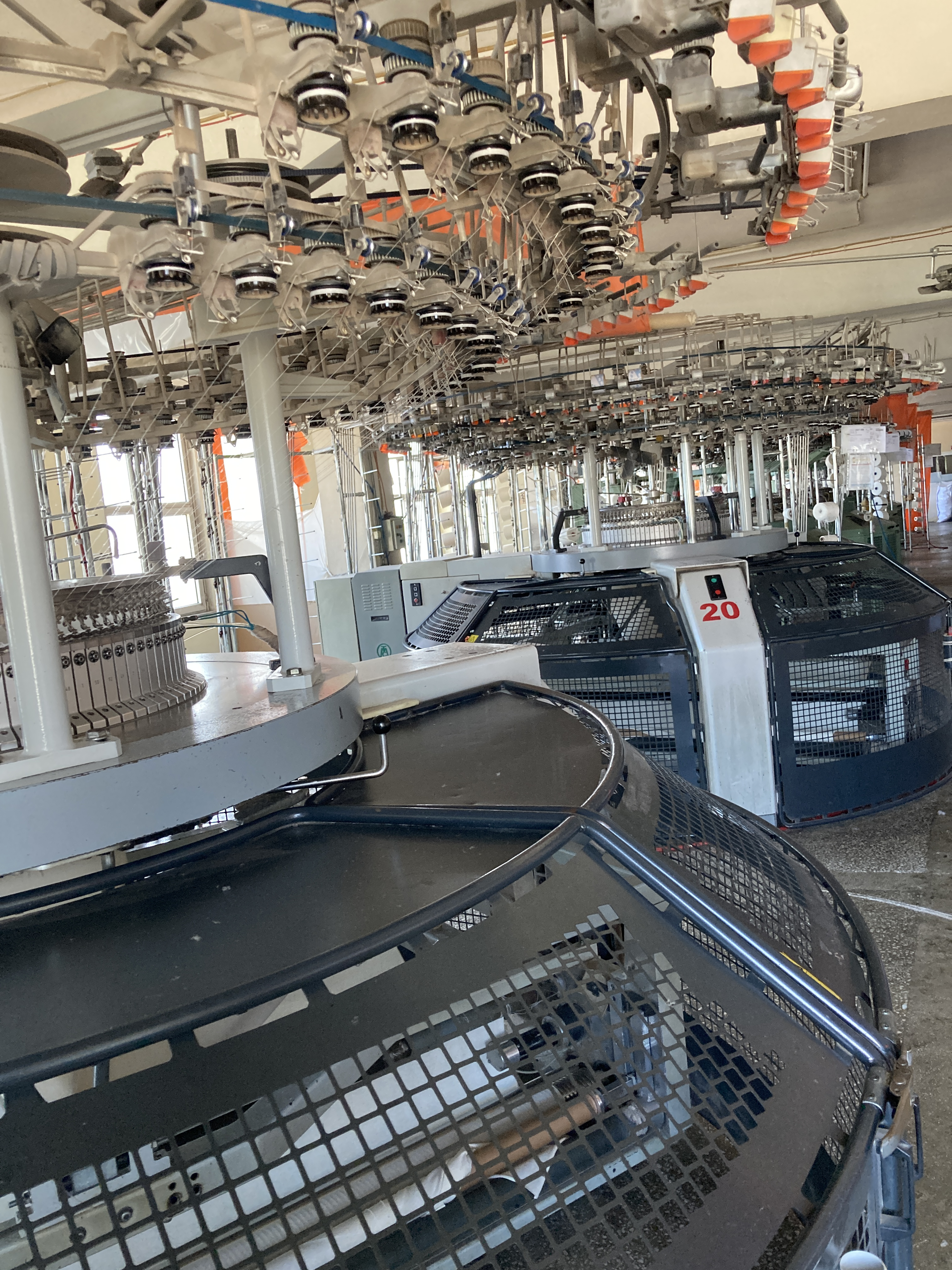
industrial circular knitting fabric machines

A knitting machine is a device used to create knitted fabrics in a semi or fully automated fashion. There are numerous types of knitting machines, ranging from simple spool or board templates with no moving parts to highly complex mechanisms controlled by electronics. All, however, produce various types of knitted fabrics, usually either flat or tubular, and of varying degrees of complexity. Pattern stitches can be selected by hand manipulation of the needles, push-buttons and dials, mechanical punch cards, or electronic pattern reading devices and computers.

== Process ==
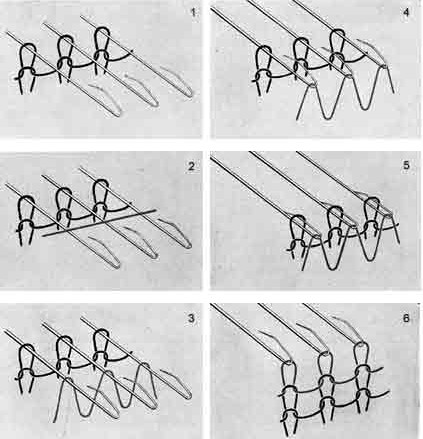
Six stages in the knitting machine cycle

Early flat bed stocking frames had low carbon steel bearded needles where the tips were reflexed and could be depressed onto a hollow closing the loop. The needles were supported on a needle bar (bed) that passed back and forth, to and from the operator. The beards were simultaneously depressed by a presser bar.

1. The needle bar goes forward- the open needles clear the web
2. The weft thread is laid on the needles
3. The weft thread falls loosely
4. The needle bar draws back, the weft is pulled in the open needles
5. The needle bar draws back, the presser bar drops, the needle loops close and the weft is drawn back through the web
6. The needles open, a new row has been added to the web which drops under gravity

This basic process can still be recognised in all machines, but it has been refined as new technologies have become available.

== Types ==
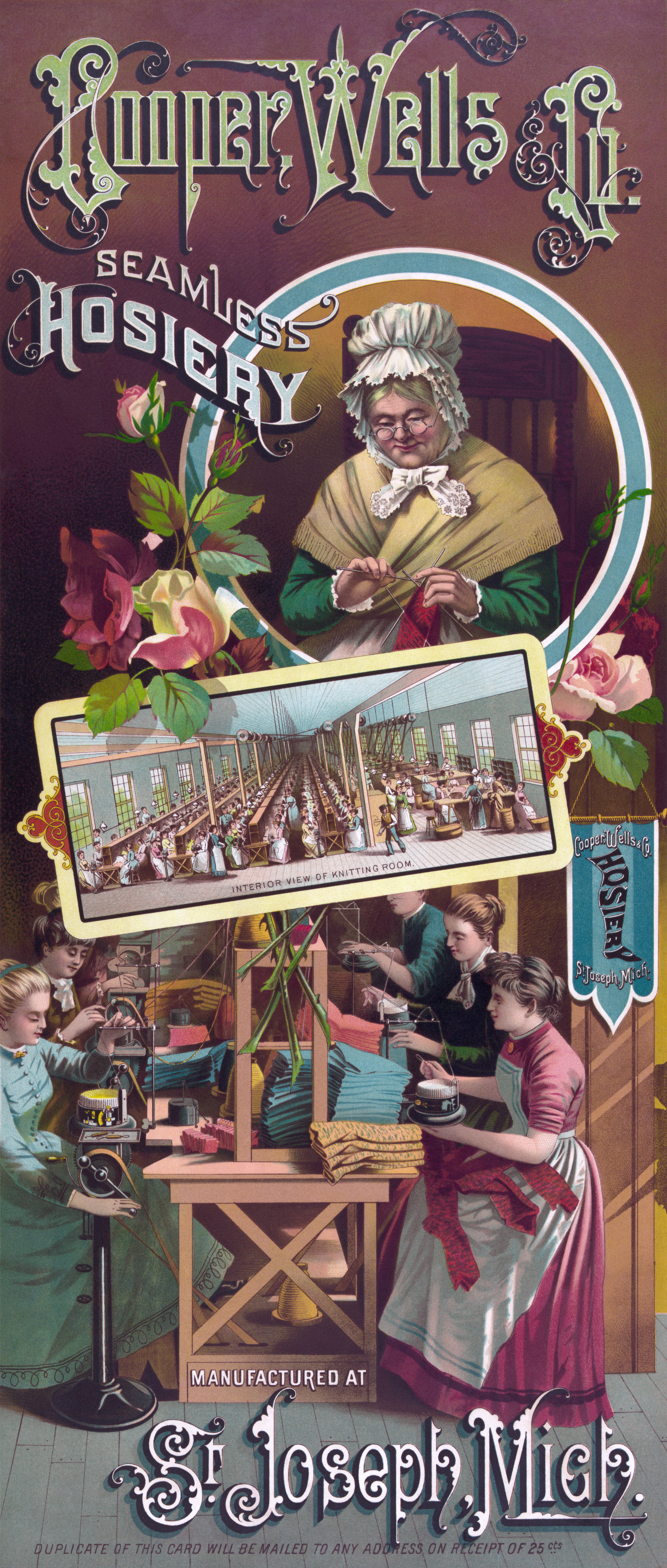
Advertisement for a late 19th-century hosiery firm that depicts its factory floor with workers using knitting machines. Published 1886.

A few simple devices permit knitting without needles for toy or hobby purposes. The simplest of these is spool knitting, followed by knitting boards or knitting looms, which consist of two rows of pins mounted in two parallel rows approximately 0.5 inches (1.3 cm) apart. Yarn is wound around the pins; various patterns of winding produce different textured knitting. A needle or special tool is then used to transfer the loops of yarn from around the pins, either off the pins or to other pins, to produce the knitting. Knitting boards can produce complex designs. Other semi-mechanical knitting devices are available.

To produce larger and more complex knitted items, domestic and industrial machines, with either flat beds producing rectangular fabrics or circular beds producing tubular fabrics are needed. Double bed machines have two flat beds facing each other, in order to produce purl and plain rib fabrics plus a variety of multi patterns. Ribbing attachments can be added to single bed machines to achieve a similar result. Without a ribbing attachment, a single bed knitting machine will only be able to make purl fabrics.

Late 20th century domestic/studio models typically have 120 to 200 latch-hook needles to hold the stitches in fine, standard, mid-gauge or bulky gauge needle. A carriage or cam box is passed across the bed of needles causing the needle movements required to produce each next stitch. By means of various selection methods, e.g. punch cards, particular needles can be caused to travel by alternate pathways through the cam box. Thus needles will knit or not, and the unknitted yarn portions will lie under (slip stitch) or over the needle or be held in the needle hook (tuck stitch). Needles can be placed in holding position to allow short row shaping. In modern machines, patterns can be obtained via either mechanical control, using punchcards, or electronic control, using computer software for patterning.

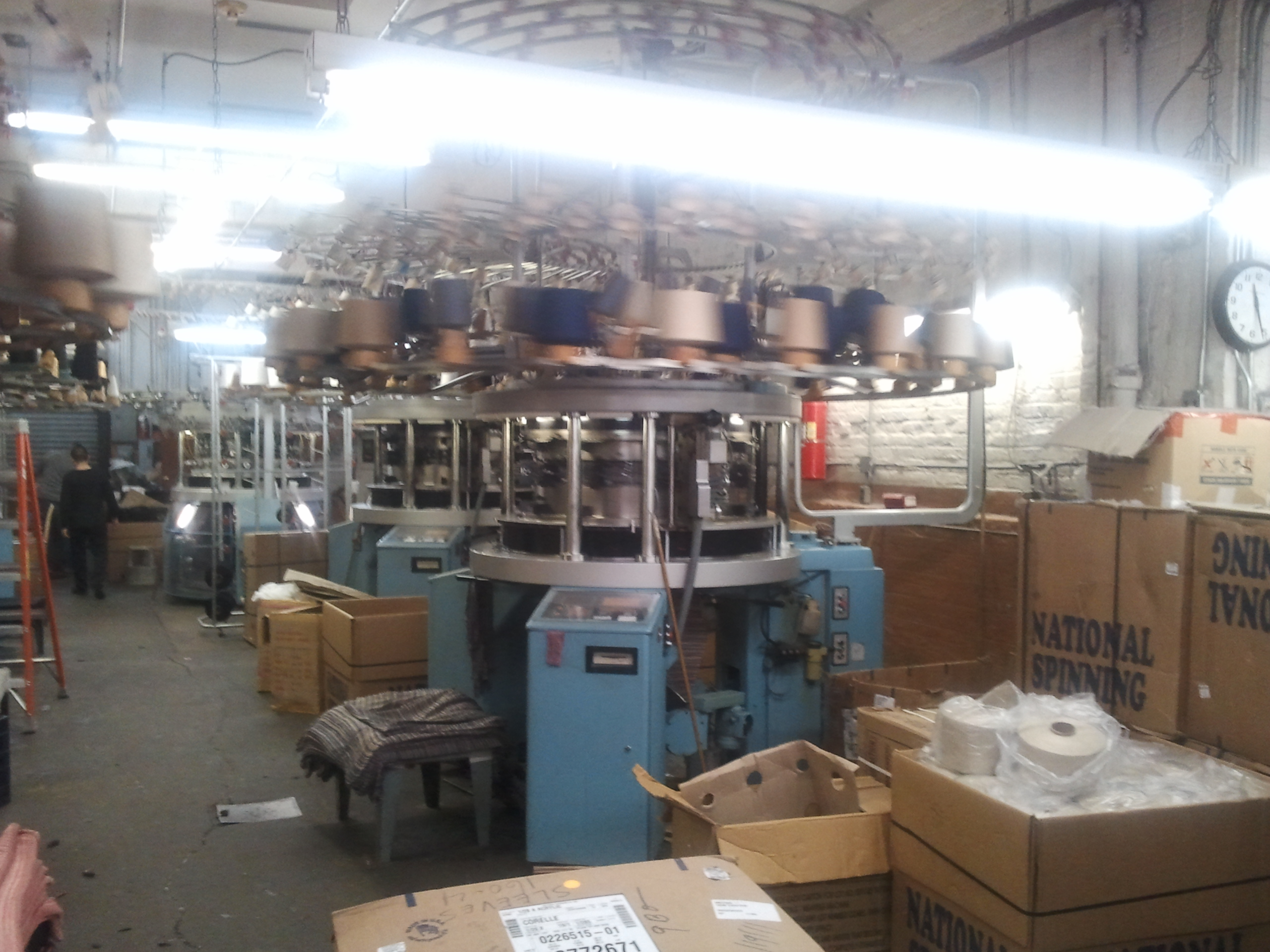
Modern electronic knitting machines

Automatic patterning machines can knit two-colour Fair Isle patterns automatically, and have machine stitch patterning features such as slipping, tucking, plating and knitweaving. Plating refers to knitting with two strands of yarn that are held in such a way that one is in front of the other. Plated effects can be particularly striking in a ribbed fabric. Knitweaving refers to a technique in which a separate piece of yarn, often heavier than the knitted fabric, is carried along and caught between stitches to produce an effect like weaving. With knitwoven fabric, the purl side (usually the wrong side) is the right side of the fabric. Slipping refers to selected stitches being skipped over by the yarn (with a float behind) and tucking refers to stitches being held until knit. Both slip and tuck patterning methods are commonly used for patterning various textured patterns. Current standard gauge models have the option of a lace carriage, where stitches can be transferred from one needle to the next. The yarn passes through a tensioning mechanism and down through the knit carriage, which feeds the yarn to the needles as they knit.

Domestic knitting machines such as Brother or Silver Reed machines use the weft knitting method which produces a fabric similar to hand knitting. Knitting proceeds more quickly than in hand knitting, where (usually two) straight needles are held in the hand and each stitch is manipulated individually across the row. Knitting machines work an entire row of loops in a single movement.

V-bed knitting machines consist of two beds located across from each other. They are called front bed and back bed- one which makes purl facing fabric and one which makes knit facing fabric. This permits the knitting of flat fabrics in knit and purl combination and can also make plain knit tubes. X-bed machines are the advanced version of the V-bed knitting machine. This type of machine adds extra metallic elements which are called holding hooks. These hooks are located above every needle for both front bed and back bed and can only hold loops. If the loop is held by the holding hook, the needle associated with it cannot be used to perform any operations.

In the 2010's, a new technology for industrial flatbed machines emerged which enabled fully finished garments to be knit in one piece with little or no assembling. Shima Seiki was the first to develop this technology, which was inspired by a glove making machine that the company had made as early as the 1960's. Others such as Stoll quickly followed suit. In 2016, Fast Retailing, the parent company of Uniqlo, signed a deal with Shima Seiki to develop a factory of WHOLEGARMENT 3D knitting machines for mass-producing garments. In 2026, multiple companies are using this technology to design and produce clothing made on-demand.

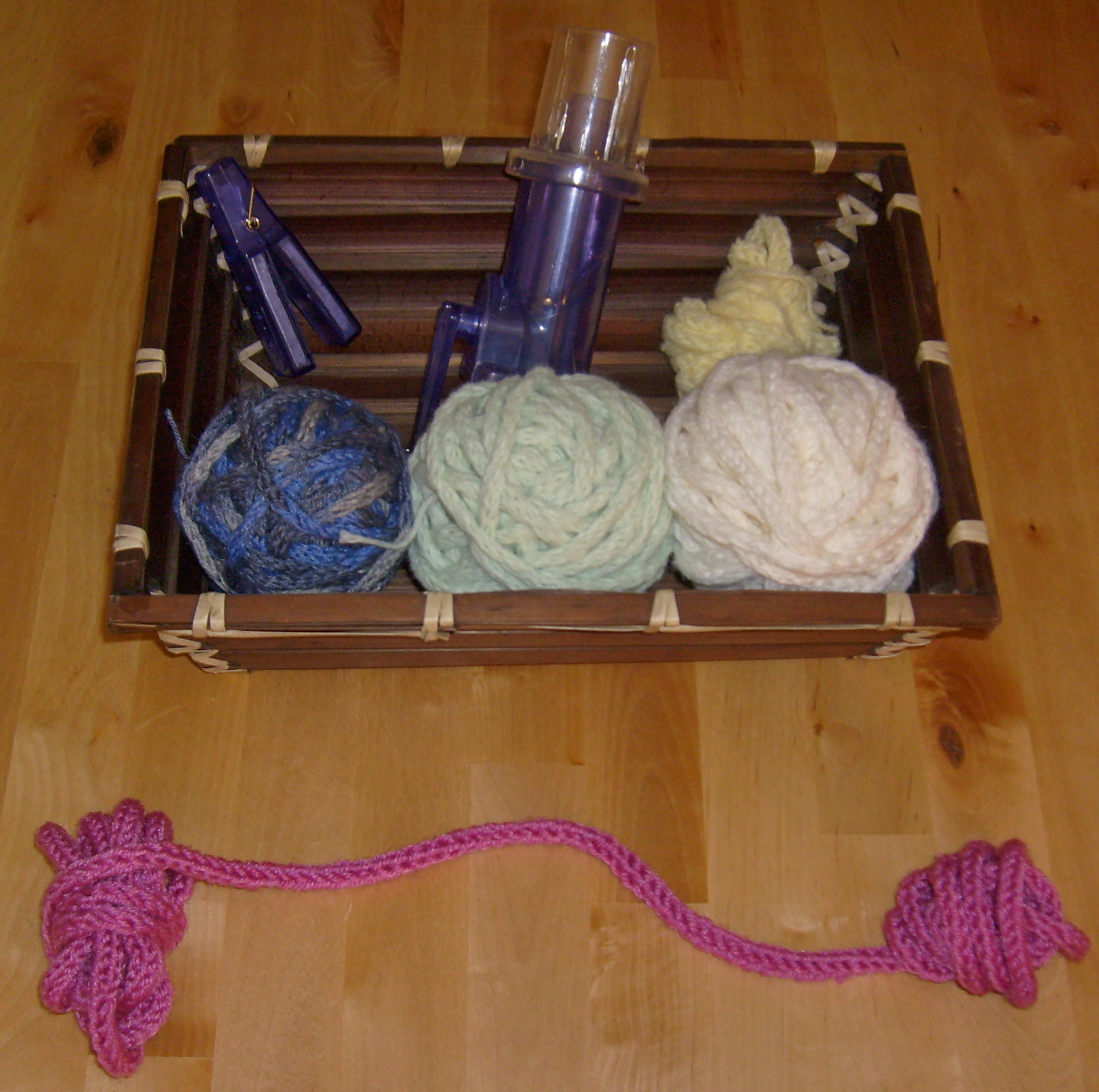
A hobbyist spool knitting machine operates on a crank.

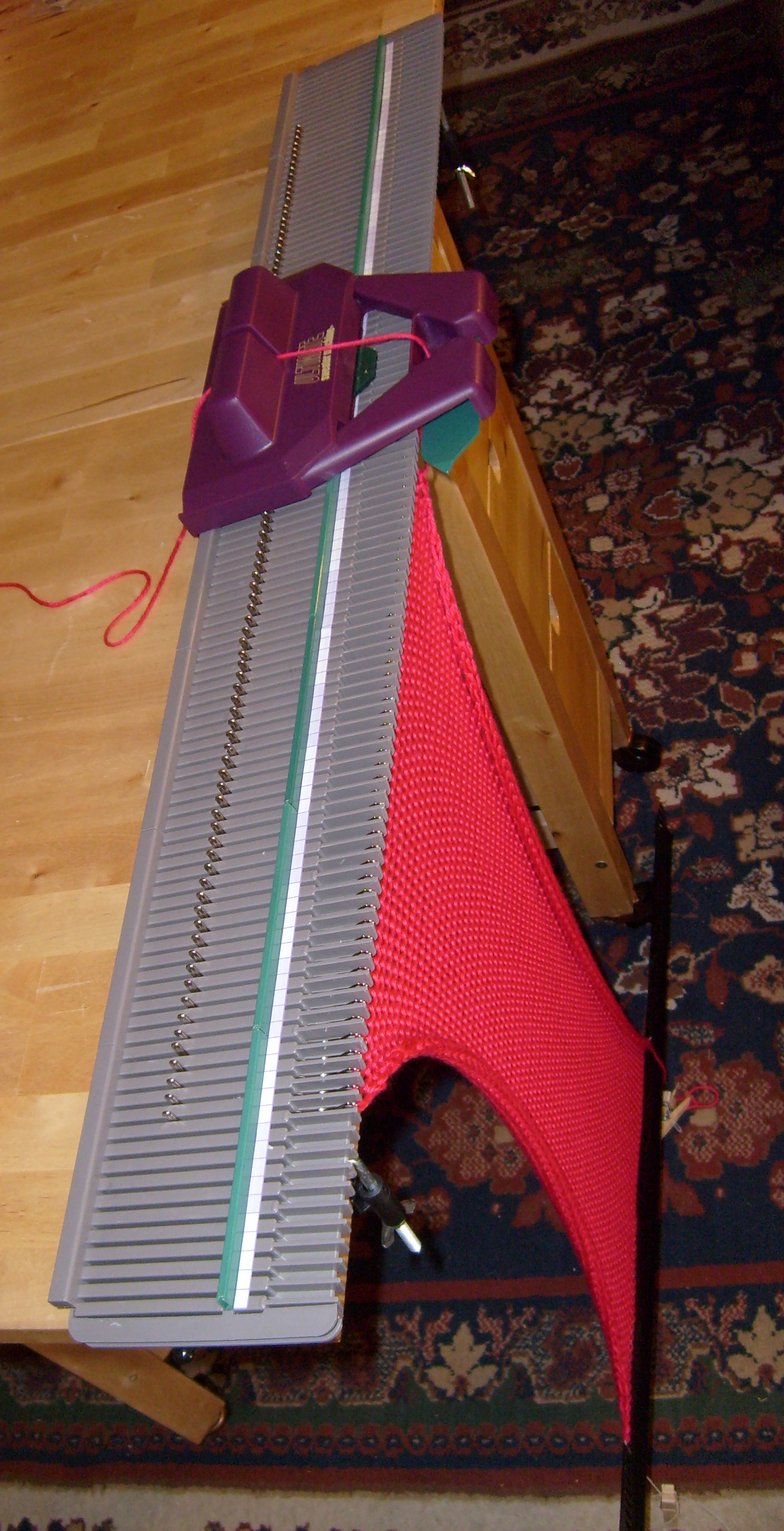
A flatbed home knitting machine

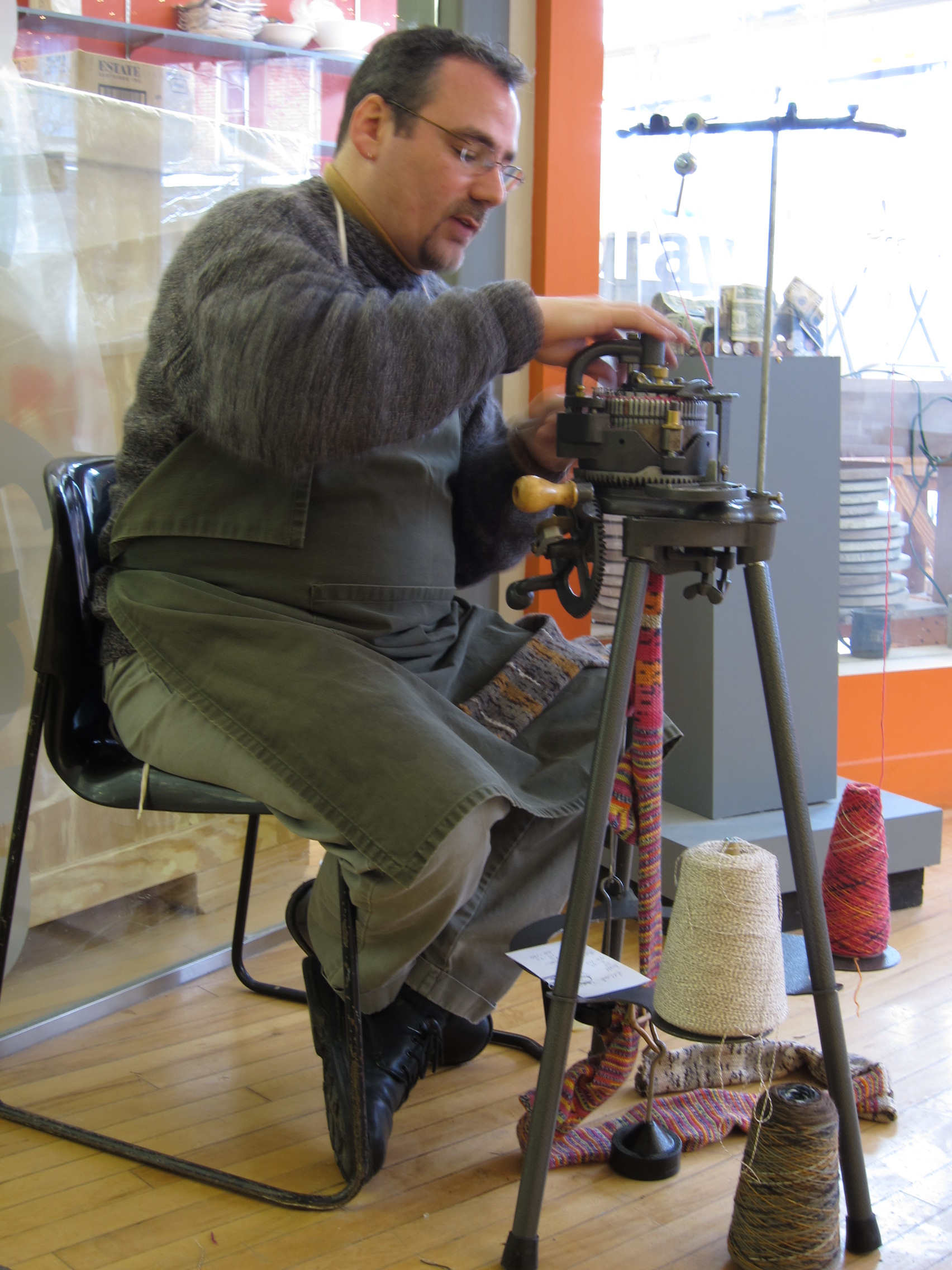
A sock-knitting machine in use

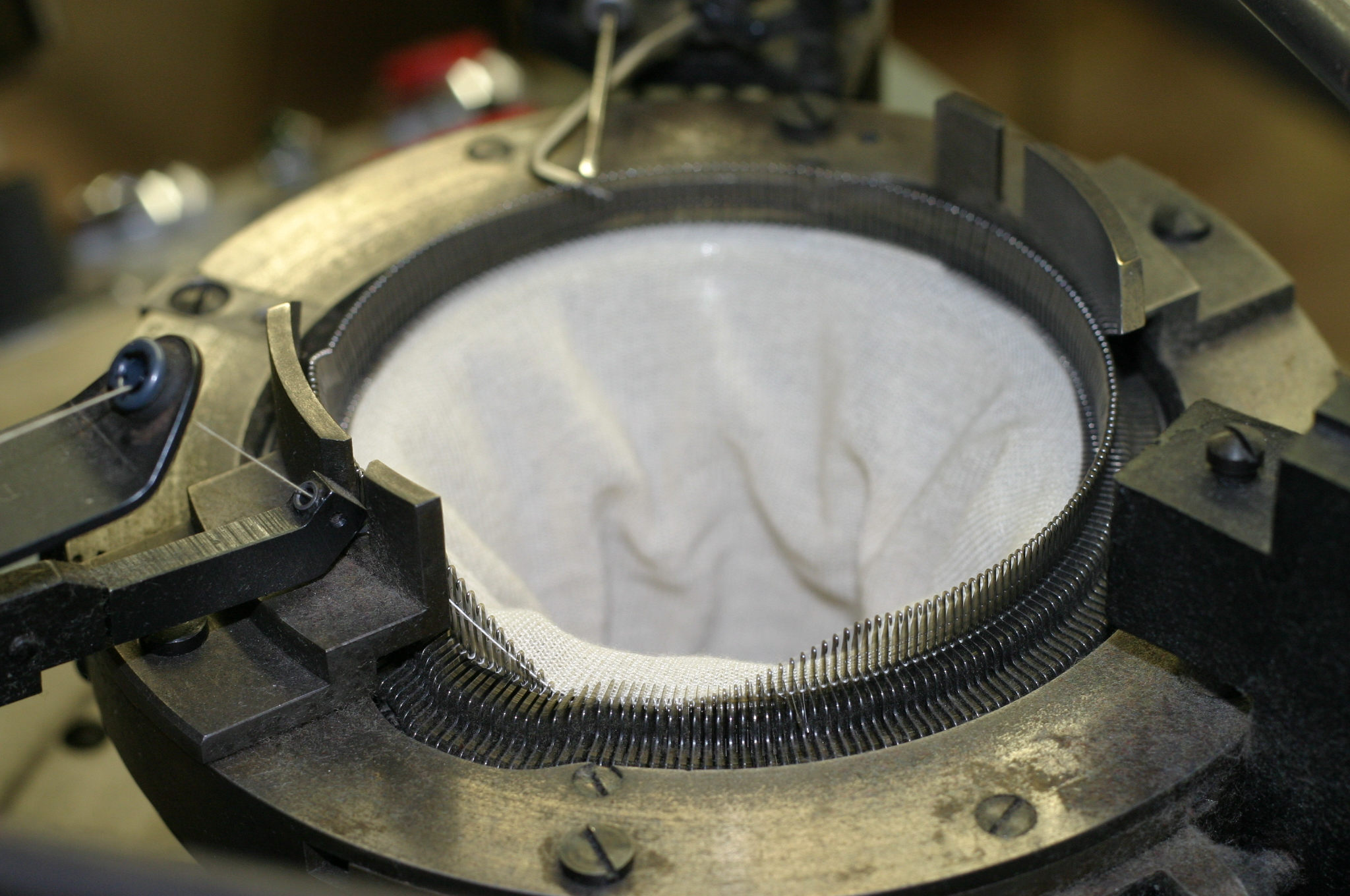
A circular knitting machine

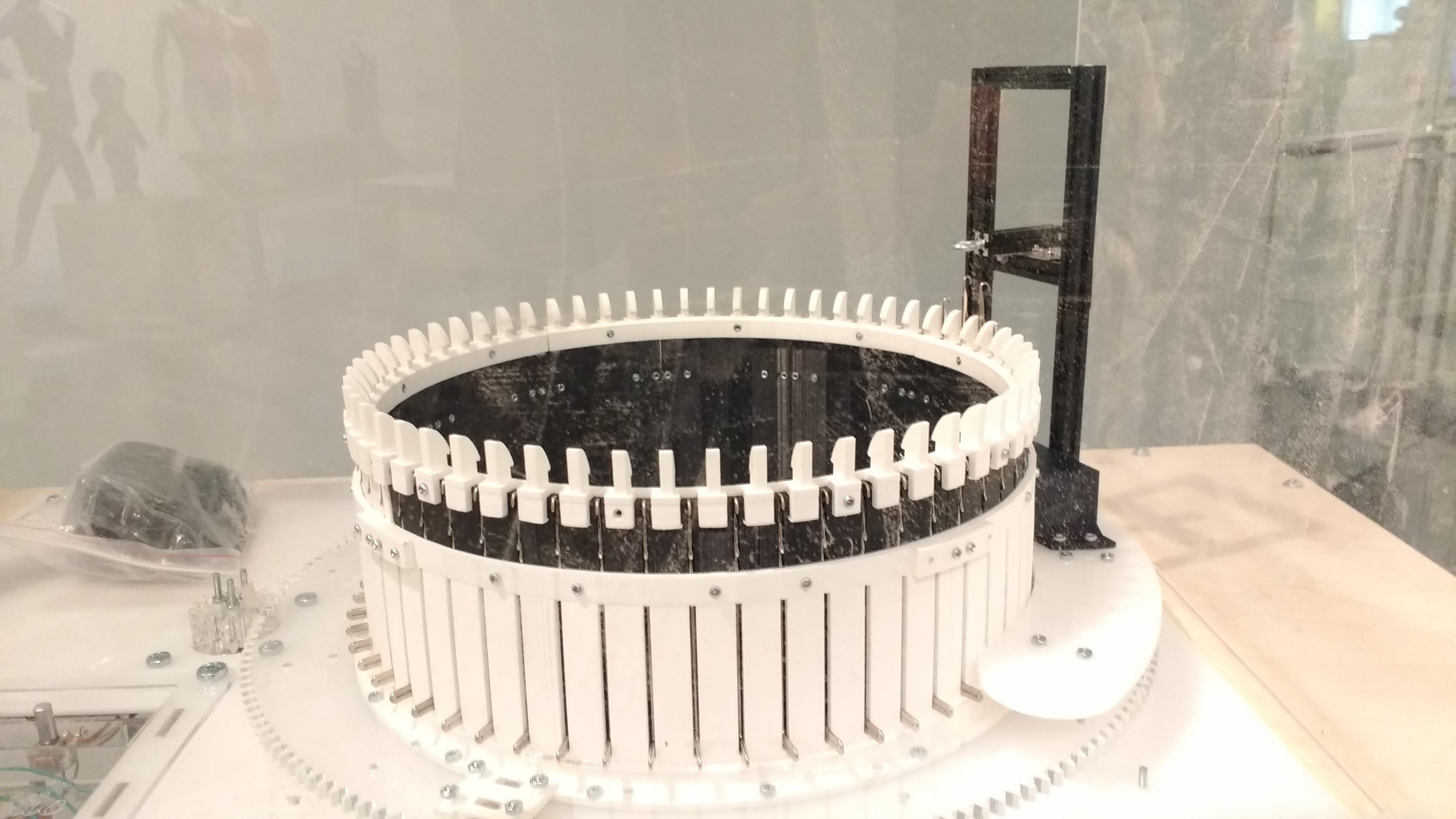
Circular Knitic open source hardware knitting machine

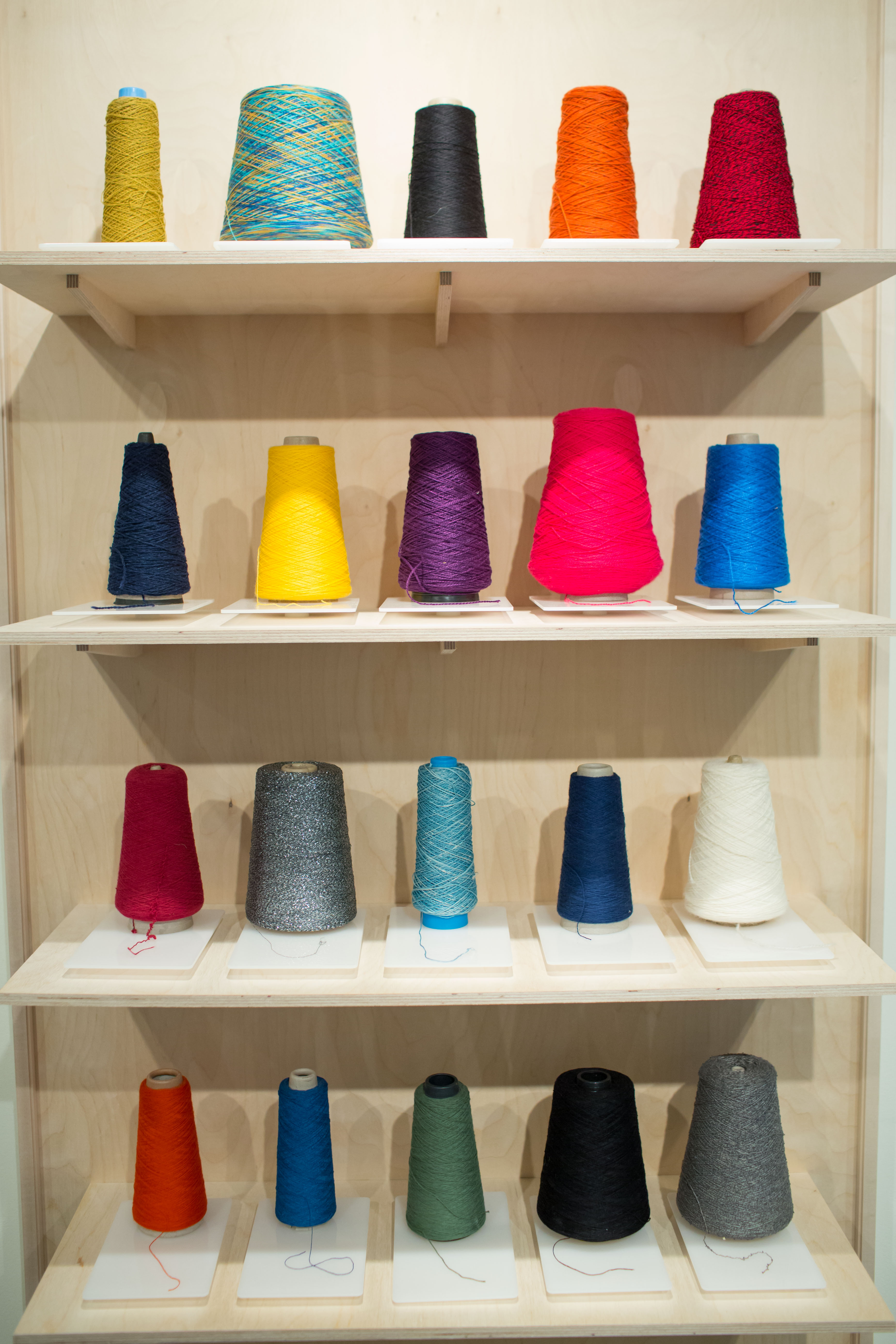
Knitting machine yarn bobbins

== Comparison to hand knitting ==
The fabric produced using a knitting machine is of a more even texture than flat knitting, hand-knitted fabric, which is particularly noticeable on large areas of plain stockinette stitch, and can be an advantage. Some stitch patterns (e.g., tuck stitches) are much easier to produce with a knitting machine. Others (e.g. garter stitch) can also be produced with machine knitting, but can take a little longer and requires that the machine have two beds. However, this is still much faster than hand knitting. On a single-bed domestic knitting machines, garter stitch must be either worked by hand or using an accessory called a 'garter bar'. Brother machines can take an electronic accessory called a 'Garter Carriage'. These carriages have a single, internally mounted needle which faces those on the main bed, and when a stitch is selected via the patterning mechanism this needle lifts the selected stitch off its needle and makes the stitch through the back, thus creating a purl stitch on the face of the fabric. Certain models of Garter carriages can be used on both mechanical and electronic Brother knitting machines.

More complex stitch transfers, such as cable stitches, require hand-manipulation to cross the groups of stitches over each other. Industrial machines that offer selective, automatic stitch transfer between front and back beds along with racking of the beds can create cable stitch automatically.

The standard gauge domestic 200-needle machine can knit the finest yarns up to a good sport-weight (4ply UK), while the heavier yarns knit better on a mid-gauge or bulky knitting machine.

Machine knitting saves a considerable amount of time but does require learning to operate the machines correctly. Most if not all hand knitting patterns can be worked up on a machine, either identically or in a similar design, but some are simpler to by hand, whilst others are easier on a machine. Hand knitting patterns are designed to "flip" the fabric on every row so that the knitter consistently uses the dominant hand. However, machine knitting is consistently knit with the fabric facing the same way. Flat bed machines knit back and forth and circular machines knit continuously in the round.

== See also ==
- History of knitting
- Stocking frame – an antique type of knitting machine
- Luddites – a social movement of English textile artisans in the early 19th century
- Textile manufacturing
- Silver Seiko Ltd. - defunct Japanese manufacturer of knitting machines
- Susanna Lewis - machine knitting artist and author

== Bibliography ==
- Candee, Richard M. (2005). The Hand Cranked Knitter and Sock Machine. Cottonwood Hill Publishing. ISBN 9780962278372.
- Earnshaw, Pat (1986). Lace Machines and Machine Laces. Batsford. ISBN 0713446846.
- Gaugliumi, Susan (1990). Hand Manipulated Stitches for Machine Knitters. Taunton Press. ISBN 9780942391039.
- Haffenden, Vikki (2018). Translating Between Hand and Machine Knitting. Crowood Press. ISBN 9781785004322.
- Kinder, Kathleen (1989). A Resource Book for Machine Knitters. Self-published. OCLC 60063326.
- Lewis, Susanna; Weissman, Julia (1986). A Machine Knitter's Guide to Creating Fabrics. Sterling Publishing Company. ISBN 9780937274125.
- McCann, James; Albaugh, Lea; Narayanan, Vidya; Grow, April; Matusik, Wojciech; Mankoff, J.; Hodgins, Jessica Kate (2016). "A Compiler for 3D Machine Knitting". ACM Transactions on Graphics. 35 (4). ACM Transactions on Graphics (TOG): 1–11. doi:10.1145/2897824.2925940. hdl:1721.1/134995. S2CID 13101322.
- Norbury, James; Agutter, Margaret (c. 1957). Odhams Encyclopaedia of Knitting. Odhams Press Ltd. OCLC 1326790.
- Taylor, Carol (1974). Machine Knitting Encyclopedia. Concord Press. OCLC 153195585.
- Thomas, Mary (1938). Mary Thomas's Knitting Book. Hodder & Stoughton. OCLC 6249445.
