= Selvage =

Narrow edge of a woven fabric parallel to its length

A piece of curtain fabric showing its selvedge, i.e. the self-finished edge in the foreground

A selvage (US English) or selvedge (British English) is a "self-finished" edge of a piece of fabric which keeps it from unraveling and fraying. The term "self-finished" means that the edge does not require additional finishing work, such as hem or bias tape, to prevent fraying.

In woven fabric, selvages are the edges that run parallel to the warp (the longitudinal threads that run the entire length of the fabric), and are created by the weft thread looping back at the end of each row. In knitted fabrics, selvages are the unfinished yet structurally sound edges that were neither cast on nor bound off. Historically, the term selvage applied only to loom woven fabric, though now can be applied to flat-knitted fabric.

The terms selvage and selvedge are a corruption of "self-edge", and have been in use since the 16th century.

== In textiles ==
=== Definition ===
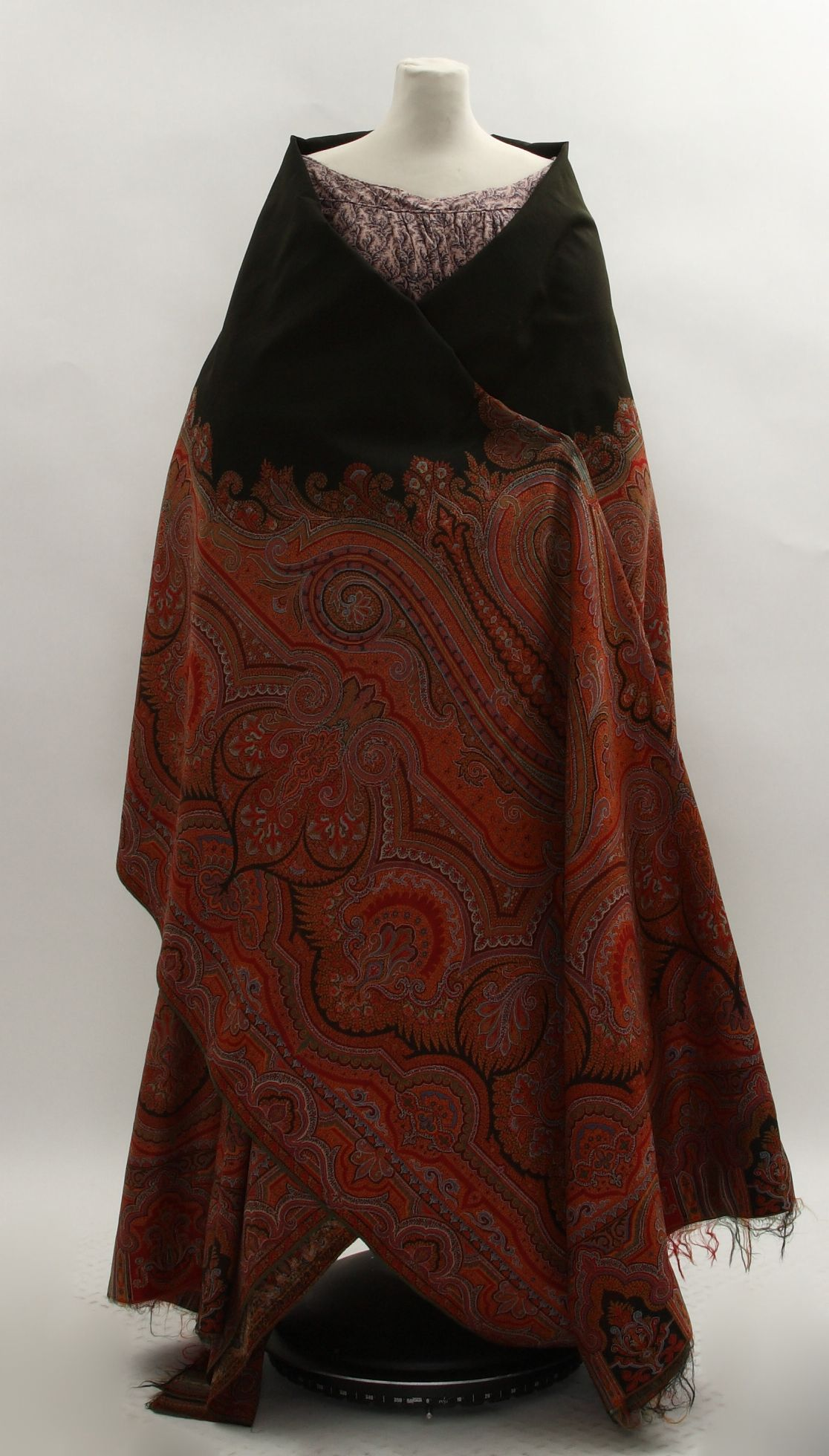
Black and red patterned wool shawl; the long edges are selvedges and the short edges are knotted fringe. c. 1820s. From the collection of Conner Prairie.

According to Hollen, Saddler & Langford, "A selvage is the self-edge of a fabric formed by the filling yarn when it turns to go back across the fabric." In traditional looms, the selvage on both sides of a piece of fabric were manufactured same, whereas in modern shuttleless looms these selvages are low because of cutting filling yarn and selvages looks like fringes.

Different types of selvages are as follows:

- Plain selvages. These are like fabric, do not wrinkle and are used in sewing selvage in fabric construction.
- Tape selvages. These are long and made by ply yarn for strength. These are broader than plain selvages and basket weave is used for flatness.
- Split selvages. Narrow fabric like towel is woven from two or more sides together and then cutting is done. Later, these cut selvages are hemmed or chain stitched for finishing.
- Fused selvages. These are fixed by temperature which is made of ribbons which are cut in narrow widths.
- Leno selvages. These are used on some type of shuttleless looms. In this cut, selvages are locked and narrow Leno weaves are done. Loose selvages generally need tight leno weaves.
- Tucked selvages. Like Leno selvages, these are done on a shuttleless loom. Machines are used to tuck the cut fabric and fix them.

=== In woven cloth ===
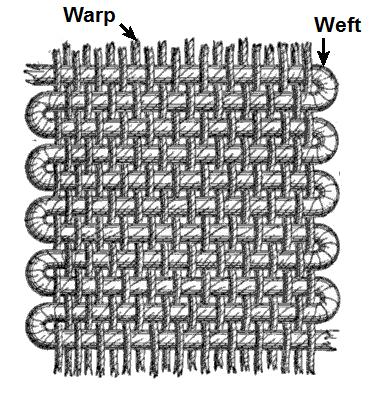
Warp and weft in a plain tabby weave, showing how the reversals of the weft create the selvages on each side. See weaving for other weave pattens.

In textile terminology, threads that run the length of the fabric (longitudinally) are warp ends. Threads running laterally from edge to edge, that is from left side to right side of the fabric as it emerges from the loom, are weft picks. Selvages form the extreme lateral edges of the fabric and are formed during the weaving process. The weave used to construct the selvage may be the same or different from the weave of the body of the fabric cloth. Most selvages are narrow, but some may be as wide as 0.75 inches or 19 mm. Descriptions woven into the selvage using special jacquards, colored or fancy threads may be incorporated for identification purposes. For many end-uses the selvage is discarded. Selvages are 'finished' and will not fray because the weft threads double back on themselves and are looped under and over the warp.

==== Handwoven selvages vs. industrial selvages ====
There is a slight difference between the selvages in handweaving and in industry, because while industrial looms originally very closely mimicked handweaving looms, modern industrial looms are very different. A loom with a shuttle, such as most hand weaving looms, will produce a very different selvage from a loom without a shuttle, like some of the modern industrial looms. Also in industry sometimes the selvage is made thicker with a binding thread.

Selvages of fabrics formed on weaving machines with shuttles, such as hand looms, are formed by the weft turning at the end of each pick (pass of the weft thread) or every second pick. To prevent fraying, various selvage motions (or "styles") are used to bind the warp into the body of the cloth. Selvages are created to protect the fabric during weaving and subsequent processing (i.e. finishing, dyeing and washing) but ideally should not detract from the finished cloth via ripples, contractions or waviness.

In handweaving the selvage is generally the same thickness as the rest of the cloth, and the pattern may or may not continue all the way to the edge, thus the selvage may or may not be patterned. A plain weave selvage is the other option, where the last few threads on either side are woven in plain weave.

In industry the selvage may be thicker than the rest of the fabric, and is where the main weft threads are reinforced with a tight weft back binding to prevent fraying. More simply, they "finish" the left and right-hand edges of fabric as it exits the loom, especially for the ubiquitous "criss-cross" simple or tabby weave, referred to in industry as taffeta weave. Selvages on machine-woven fabric often have little holes along their length, through the thick part (see stenter pins), and can also have some fringe. The type or motion of selvage depends on the weaving technique or loom used. A water-jet or air-jet loom creates a fringed selvage that is the same weight as the rest of the cloth, as the weft thread is drawn via a jet nozzle, which sends the weft threads through the shed with a pulse of water. The selvage is then created by a heat cutter which trims the thread at both ends close to the edge of the cloth, and then it is beaten into place. Thus it creates a firm selvage with the same thickness as the rest of the cloth.

==== Usability of the selvage ====
In the decorative embellishment of garments, especially in decorative pleat or ruffles, a selvage used as a ruffle is "self-finished", that is, it does not require additional finishing work such as hem or bias tape to prevent fraying.

Very often fabric near the selvage is unused and discarded, as it may have a different weave pattern, or may lack pile or prints that are present on the rest of the fabric, requiring that the selvage fabric be cut off or hidden in a hem. Since industrially loomed fabric often has selvages that are thicker than the rest of the fabric, the selvage reacts differently. It may shrink or "pucker" during laundering and cause the rest of the object made with it to pucker also.

Thicker selvages are also more difficult to sew through. Quilters especially tend to cut off the selvage right after washing the fabric and right before cutting it out and sewing it together.

For garments, however, the selvage can be used as a structural component as there is no need to turn under that edge to prevent fraying if a selvage is used instead. Using the selvage eliminates unnecessary work, thus the garment article can be made faster, the finished garment is less bulky and can be stitched entirely by machine. This is of major benefit for the mass-produced ready-to-wear clothing of modern society. However, it is less used in homemade clothes because of the tendency of the selvage to pucker.

=== In knitted cloth ===
Applying the term selvage to a hand-knitted object is still relatively new. Most books on fabric define a selvage as the edge of a woven cloth. However, the term is coming into usage for hand-knitted objects. The edges of machine-knitted fabric on the other hand are rarely if ever referred to as selvages.

Selvages in knitting can either bear a special pattern worked into the first and last stitches or simply be the edge of the fabric. The two most common selvage stitches are the chain-edge selvage and the slipped-garter edge, both of which produce a nice edge. The chain-edge selvage is made by alternating rows of slipping the first stitch knitwise and knitting the last stitch, with rows of slipping the first stitch purlwise and purling the last stitch. The slipped garter edge is made by slipping the first stitch knitwise and knitting the last in every row. Other selvages include a garter stitch border one stitch wide, or a combination of the above techniques.

Knitting selvages makes the fabric easier to sew together than it would be otherwise. It also makes it easier to pick up stitches later, and is a good basis for crocheting a further decorative edge.

== In printing ==
In the print industry, selvage is the excess area of a printed or perforated sheet of any material, such as the white border area of a sheet of stamps or the wide margins of an engraving etc.

== In philately ==
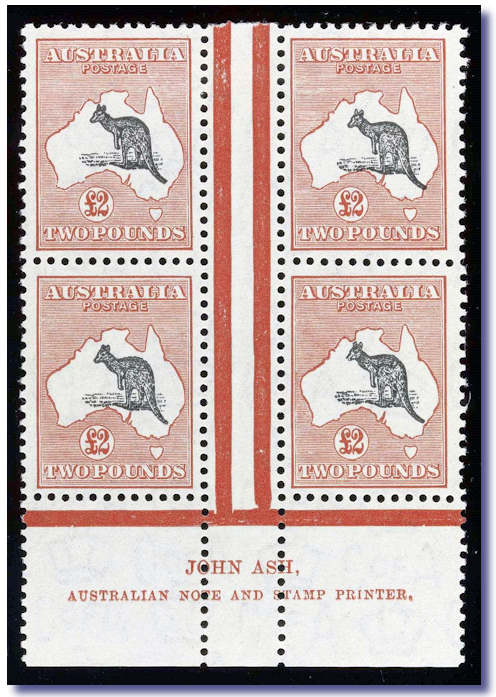
Part of a sheet of postage stamps from Australia showing selvage at the bottom

In security printing, such as for postage stamps, the selvage comprises the extra paper around the four borders of the sheet of printed items. In many cases there is printed information on the selvage which is of interest and importance to philatelists.

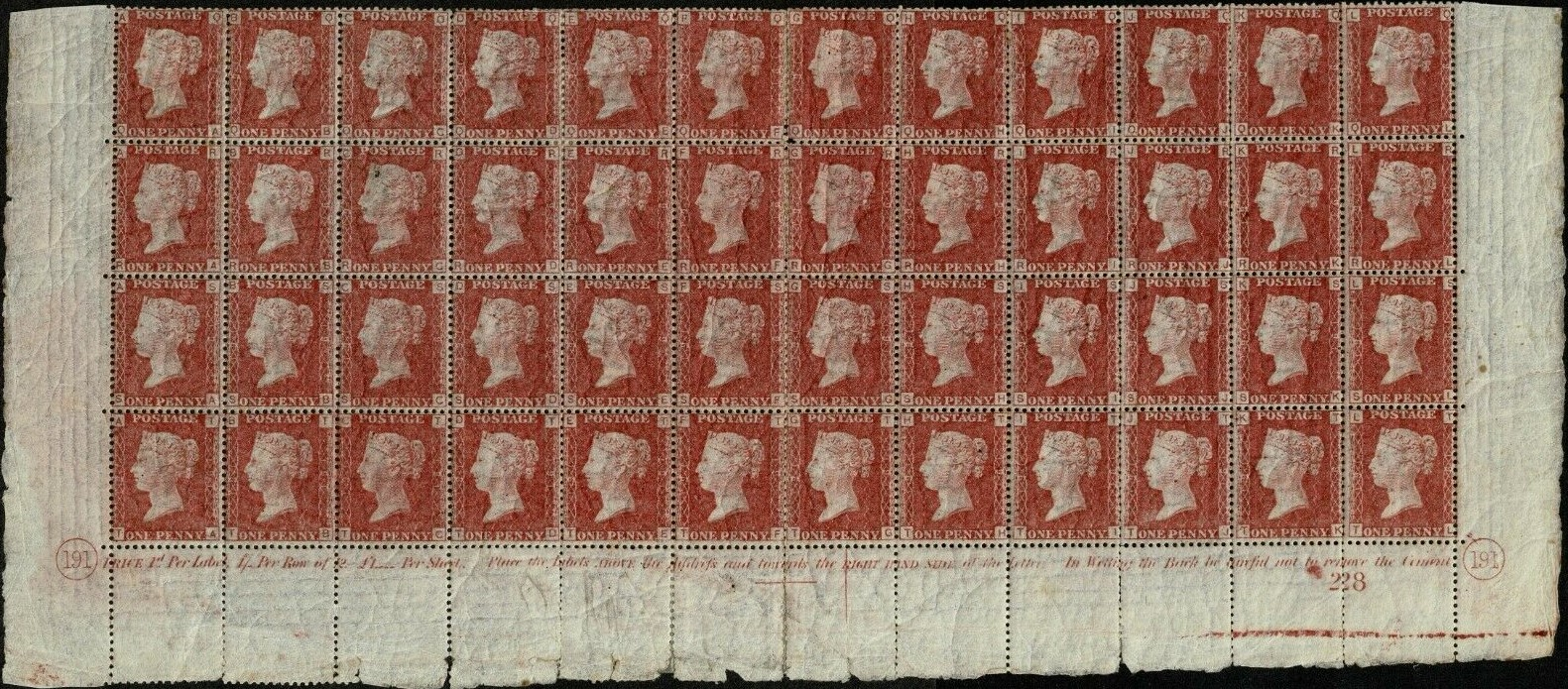
A partial sheet of 1876 British Penny Red postage stamps from Plate 191, showing the selvedge and inscriptions on three sides..

This information may include an identifying number for the printing plate that has been used, the name of the printing company, and various technical printing marks for alignment or confirmation as to which colors have been printed in multi-color printing.
