= Woven fabric =

Textiles formed by weaving

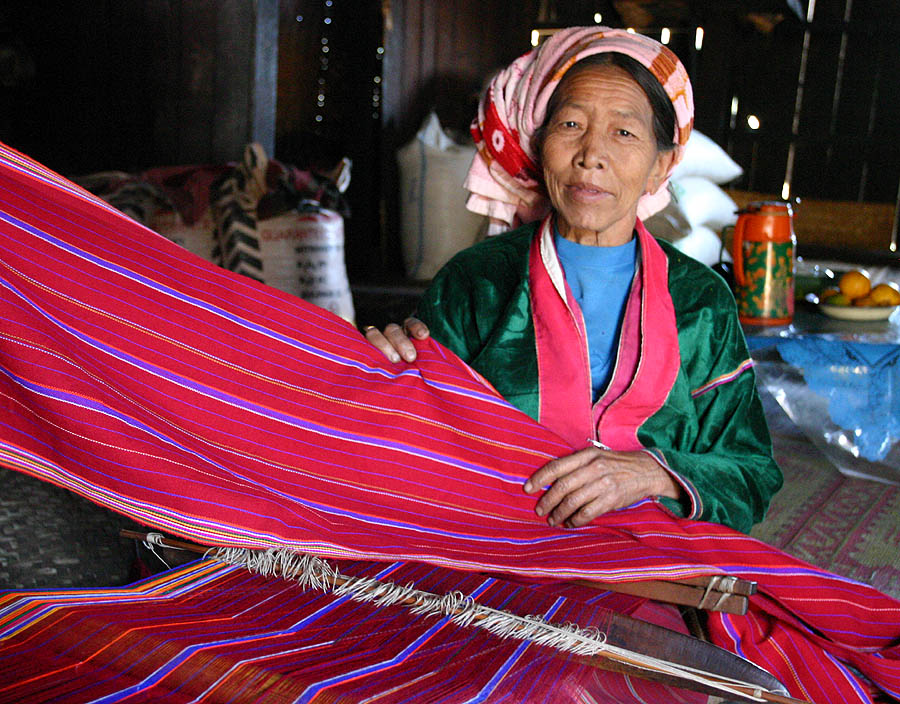
A Palaung woman weaving a vibrant fabric on a lap loom.

Woven fabric is any textile formed by weaving. Woven fabrics, often created on a loom, are made of many threads woven in a warp and weft. Technically, a woven fabric is any fabric made by interlacing two or more threads at right angles to one another.

Woven fabrics can be made of natural fibers, synthetic fibers, or a mixture of both, such as cotton and polyester. Woven fabrics are used for clothing, decorations, furniture, flags, carpets, and other uses.

== Production process ==
Fibers are spun into yarns and prepared with specific properties tailored for either the warp (longitudinal yarns) or the weft (transverse yarns).

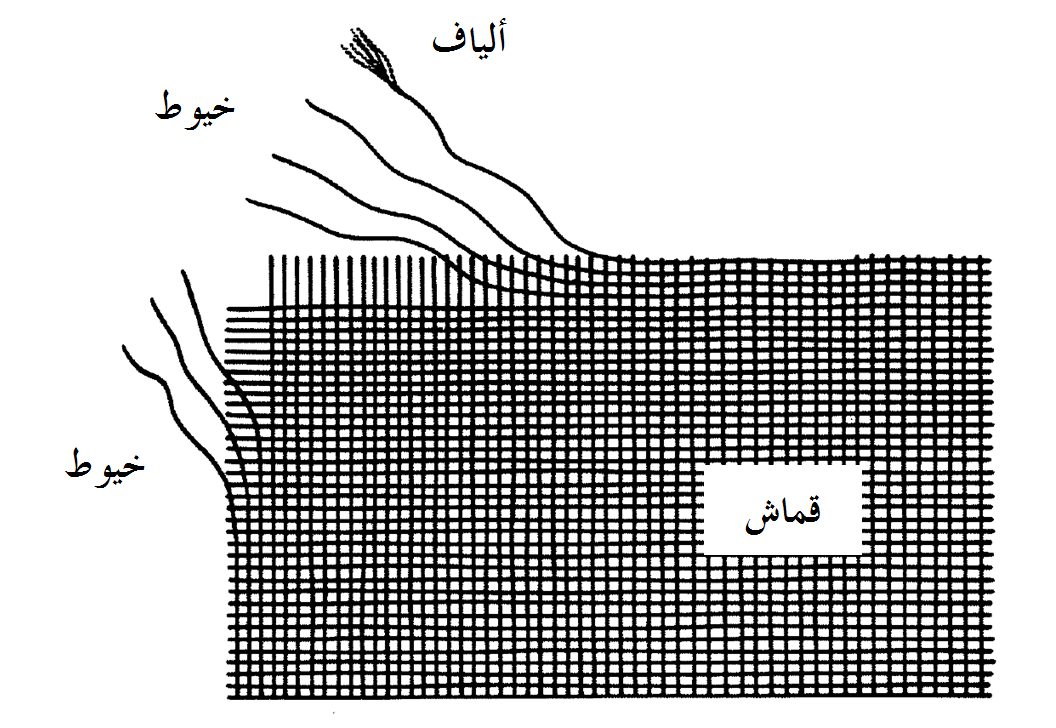
An Arabic-language graphic distinguishing raw fibers from processed threads and woven fabric.

The warp yarns are arranged on a beam to prepare for weaving. The warp threads are held taut and parallel, and as such must be strong and durable.

During weaving, the weft yarn passes over and under the warp yarns in various patterns. The primary types of weaves are plain weave, twill weave, and satin weave. These basic types have been extrapolated into a variety of diverse patterns that serve both form and function.

After weaving, the fabric undergoes several finishing processes, which might include bleaching, dyeing, printing, and treatments to enhance performance characteristics, like water or shrinkage resistance.

== Qualities ==
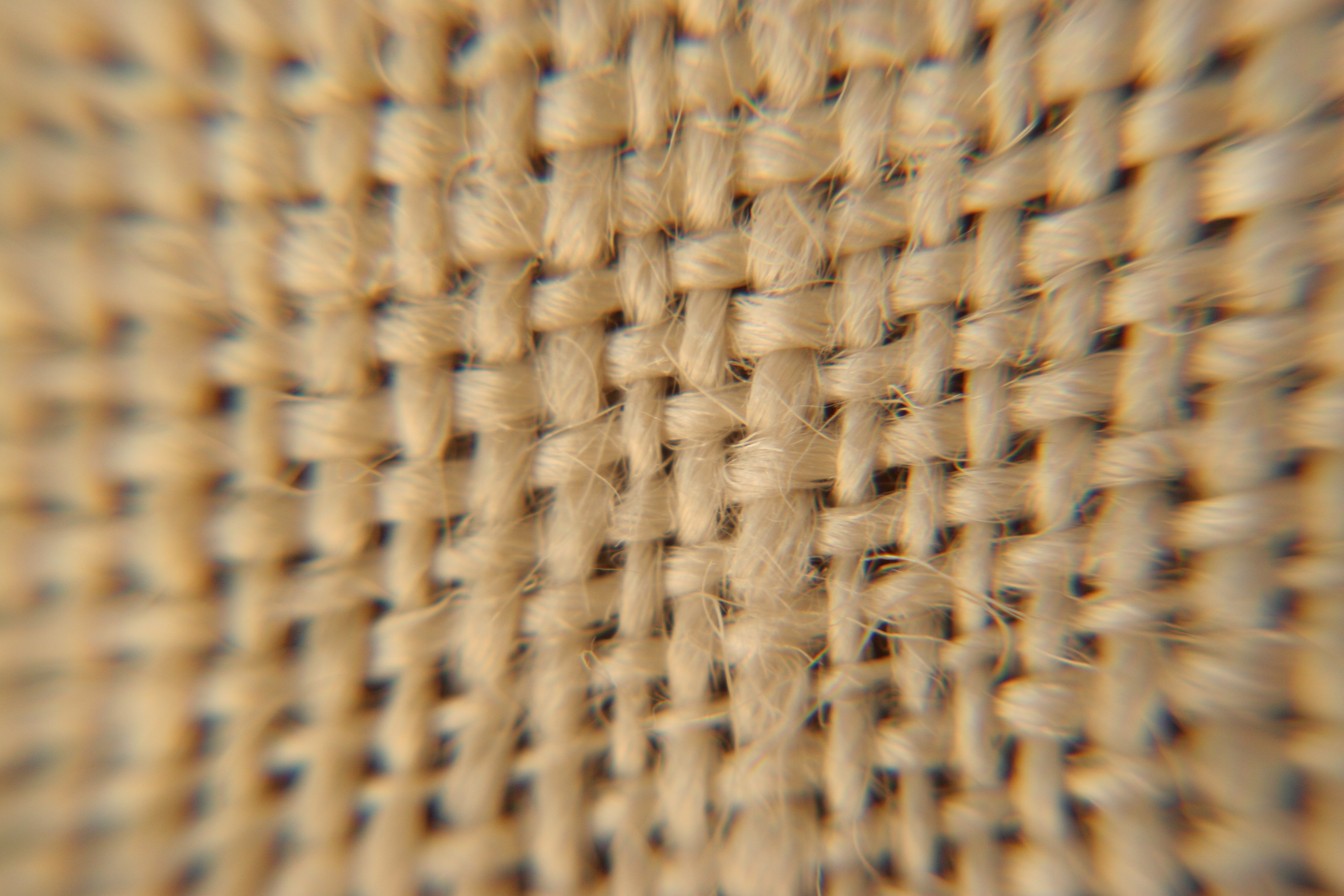
Plain weave

Woven fabrics do not stretch as easily as knitted fabrics, which can make them advantageous for many uses. They only stretch diagonally on the bias (between the warp and weft directions) unless the threads used are elastic. Woven cloth usually frays at the edges unless techniques are used to counter fraying, such as hemming or the use of pinking shears. Different companies use textiles differently to create products. Closely woven fabric is more durable and keeps its shape better.

The warp and weft can be woven together in different variations of the three basic weaves; plain, twill, and satin.

== History ==
=== Prehistory ===
it has been suggested that, beginning in the Stone Age, any materials accessible to humans at the time were used to make woven cloth. This included wool, flax fibers, and animal intestines. Researcher and historian Perry Walton suggests rush fibers and animal skin cut into strips as specific examples.

=== Early civilization ===
The first shawls and carpets were woven in Persia. In 2640 B.C., silk weaving became common in China. Egyptian mummies have been found in woven Nile linen cloth. In the Bible, there are numerous references to woven fabric, and multiple scriptures mention garments created from woven fabric. Native Americans, Mexicans, and Peruvians also wove cloth. Colorful fabrics were seen as more desirable, and as such, multiple methods of producing high-saturation cloth were developed.

The white tapa cloth of the South Sea Islands was not woven, but rather beaten together. The exterior green bark was stripped from the branches of the "cloth tree", a species of mulberry. The remaining fibrous substance was then removed from the stick to which it had adhered.

=== Middle Ages ===
The first step to making woven fabric easier involves the use of a spindle and distaff. The spindle is a round stick of wood with a notch at one end for the yarn to catch. The distaff is a longer stick around which the material is spun. The two would twist loose fibers into yarn, but in a completely different and more complex manner.

There are early records of items similar to the spindle and distaff. It was said there were stone records from Solomon, Homer, and Herodotus alluding to the two items. The first recorded example of a distaff was in England, created by Anthony Bonvoise around the time of Henry VIII's reign; it led to the creation of Coxal cloth. In 14th-century Europe, a wheel was mounted and placed on top of a frame to make cloth, as a female worker could place a seat by the wheel. The idea came to be in 1533 by a citizen from Brunswick.

=== Industrial Revolution ===
Come the Industrial Revolution, the proliferation of factories resulted in the fastest spread of woven textiles. One of the first official factories was a business known as “Jack of Newbury”. The owner, John Winchcombe, would create clothes for Henry VIII and his wife Catherine. Looms of fabric were created in his Newbury home, and so began the birth of woven fabric factories. This also marked the beginning of woven fabric becoming a product to be sold. According to Walton:

At first fabrics were a by-product of agriculture in England, for the farm homestead was the seat of the textile industry. The males of the household raised the flocks, while the females spun the yarn and wove the fabrics; and so the industry thrived and prospered for hundreds of years, giving occupation and income to thousands of the agricultural class. As time went on, the farmers of certain sections, particularly about Bury, Oldham, Preston, Manchester, and Chester, became the more expert in the art, and soon the beginning of the factory system appeared in a separation of spinning from weaving, the two originally being done by one person.

In the 1700s, the first official cotton mill was established; it used horses to spin cotton into woven fabric, but this was not practical.

The growing demand for fabric called for a faster way for the household item to be developed in this monotonous line of work, leading to the invention of the spinning frame.

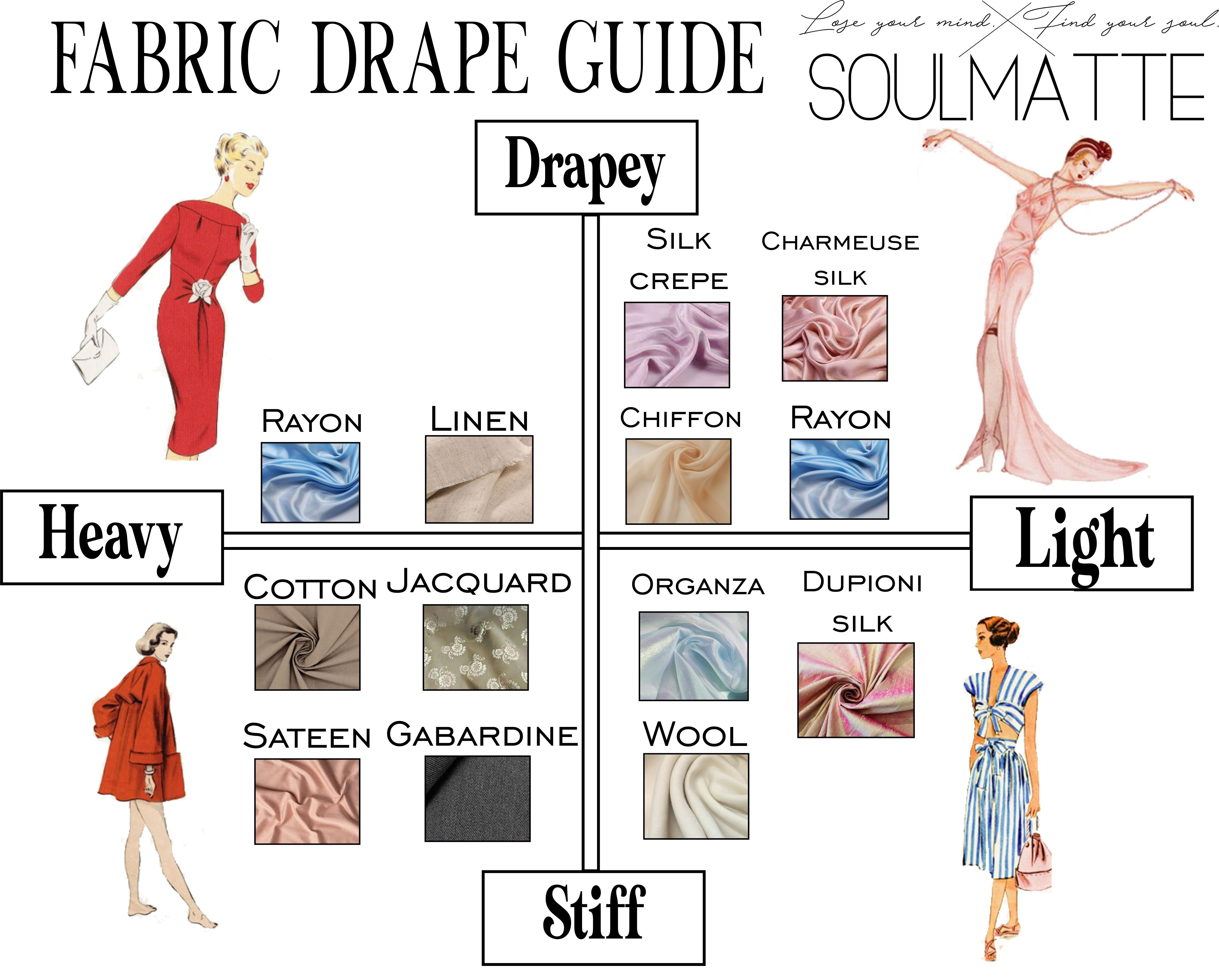
Types of woven textiles for dresses.

== See also ==
- Knitted fabric
- Nonwoven fabric
