= Bias knitting =

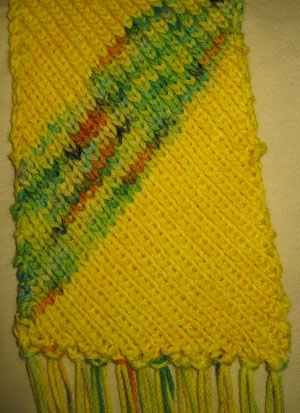
Bias knitting in a scarf

Bias knitting is where the rows of a fabric run diagonally, instead of horizontally.

In knitting, biased fabric is created by pairing increases and decreases, often at the edges of a piece, which shifts the row's stitches to the side as compared to the stitches knitted directly below them. This shift forces the rows to run at an angle, instead of horizontally. A single increase/decrease paired on every other row (Right Side only, for instance), would yield a 45° slant. More increases/decreases result in sharper angles and less yields a softer slant.

”Chevron stitch” is a well known example of biasing, as it relies on the concept to create pronounced V's in the knitted fabric. Chevrons are simply biased fabric where the slant switches directions every so many stitches.

Biased fabric (whether hand knitted, machine knitted or even woven, where the fabric's threads run on the diagonal) also has a softer drape as compared to regular fabric, so it's generally perceived as being more attractive when worn. The high-end fashion industry uses biased fabric quite often, but this use of fabric is more expensive because less of the fabric bolt is usable within the limits of cutting all shapes diagonally. This is also why low-end clothing manufacturers do not use biased fabric -- the clothing might look better on their customers, but it would also increase the materials cost, which would price the product out of their target customers’ reach.
