= Aran jumper =

Irish cabled pullover or cardigan sweater

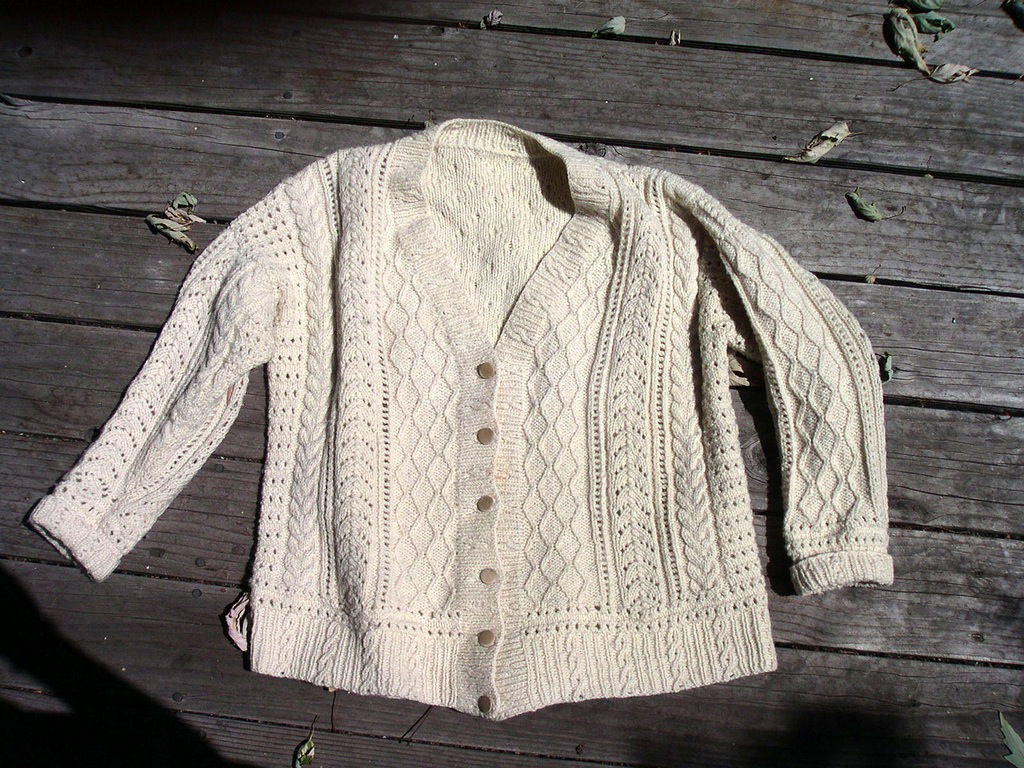
An Aran cardigan in the traditional white báinín colour.

The Aran jumper (Irish: Geansaí Árann), also called a fisherman's jumper or a gansey, is a style of jumper that takes its name from the Aran Islands off the west coast of Ireland. A traditional Aran Jumper usually is off-white in colour, with cable patterns on the body and sleeves. Originally the jumpers were knitted using unscoured wool that retained its natural oils (lanolin) which made the garments water-resistant and meant they remained wearable even when wet.

Use of the word jumper (or other options such as "pullover" and "jersey") is largely determined by the regional version of English used. In the case of Ireland, Britain and Australia, "jumper" is the standard word, "jersey" is used in South Africa and New Zealand, whereas "sweater" is mainly found in tourist shops and in North America. The word used in Irish is geansaí.

== Characteristics ==
Traditionally, an Aran jumper is made from undyed cream-coloured báinín (pronounced "bawneen"), a yarn made from sheep's wool, sometimes "black-sheep" wool. They were originally made with unwashed wool that still contained natural sheep lanolin, making the garment water-repellent.

The jumper usually features 4–6 texture patterns each of which is about 5–10 cm (2.0–3.9 in) in width, that move down the jumper in columns from top to bottom. Usually, the patterns are symmetrical to a centre axis extending down the centre of the front and back panel. The patterns also usually extend down the sleeves as well. The same textured knitting is also used to make socks, hats, vests, and skirts.

== History ==
There is debate about when island residents first started making the jumpers. Some stitch patterns are believed, erroneously, to have a traditional interpretation, often of religious significance. These interpretations were fabricated by Heinz Edgar Kiewe, a yarn shop owner who noticed a chance resemblance between Aran stitches and Celtic knotwork, and assumed that Aran knitting was at least as old as, if not older than, the knotwork it resembles. He wrote a book on his suppositions, The Sacred History of Knitting, which provides most of the mythology surrounding the Aran jumper. His thesis has, however, been thoroughly debunked by many historians of knitting, including Richard Rutt, Alice Starmore and Vawn Corrigan.

Most historians agree that far from being an ancient craft, Aran knitting was invented as recently as the 1890s and early 1900s, when the Congested Districts Board sought to improve the fishing industry in the Islands. Fishermen and their wives from other regions in Britain and Ireland came to help train the islanders in better fishing and fish-processing skills, bringing with them an existing tradition of knitted guernsey jumpers. These guernsey jumpers have similar stitch patterns, though usually only on the yoke, and are worked in fine wool not available to the Aran Islanders. Enterprising local women began knitting their own version, using thicker local wool, all-over patterning, and different construction such as saddle shoulders, rather than the more usual gusseted drop sleeve. Vawn Corrigan dates the adult Aran gansey as we know it today to 1932 when the first one was commissioned by social reformer Muriel Gahan. The first commercially available Aran knitting patterns were published in the 1940s by Patons of England. Vogue magazine carried articles on the garment in the 1950s, and jumper exports from the west of Ireland to the United States began in the early 1950.

The development of the export trade during the 1950s and 1960s took place after P. A. Ó Síocháin organised an instructor, with the help of a grant from the Congested Districts Board for Ireland, to go to the islands and teach the knitters how to make garments to standard international sizings. He commissioned the Irish artist Seán Keating, who had spent much time on the islands, to design and illustrate marketing brochures. Knitting became an important part of the islands' economy. Adding to the popularity of the Aran jumpers were The Clancy Brothers and Tommy Makem, an Irish folk music group which started recording in New York City in the late 1950s and who adopted the Arans as their trademark on-stage garments. In the early 1960s they appeared on The Ed Sullivan Show and even in a special televised performance for US president John F. Kennedy. The national exposure and the rising popularity of The Clancy Brothers and Tommy Makem fuelled the demand for Aran jumpers even more. During the 1960s, even with all available knitters recruited from the three islands and from other parts of Ireland, Ó Síocháin had difficulty in fulfilling orders from around the world. At the height of the fashion for Arans, the knitwear even inspired the British and French fashion scenes: Dublin-born London designer, Digby Morton (1906–83) featured Aran-"inspired" handknits for the first time in his 1955 autumn show in London, and by 1960, the Irish Times fashion editor was noting that the Irish hand-knit look was influencing Paris couture woollens. The Ardfinnan Woollen Mills reproduced greasy Aran weight yarn similar to traditional hand spun yarn from the Aran Islands to supply to the growing market and was said to be used in The Clancy Brothers Aran sweaters. The Aran jumper had a fashion moment in July 2020, when Taylor Swift wore the garment in a photo-shoot that accompanied the release of her album, Folklore.

=== Myths ===
Part of the appeal and popularity of Aran Jumper comes from the array of myths propagated by Heinz Edgar Kiewe:

1. The moss stitch is said to signify an abundance of growth.
2. The blackberry stitch represents nature.
3. The honeycomb is a said to be a lucky stitch, signifying plenty.
4. Lattice or basket stitches to represent the old wicker basket patterns.
5. The Ladder of Life and Tree of Life represent the stages of life.

It is sometimes said that each islander (or his family) had a jumper with a unique design, so that if he drowned and was found, maybe weeks later, on the beach, his body could be identified. This misconception may have originated with John Millington Synge's 1904 play Riders to the Sea, in which the body of a dead Islander is identified by his hand-knitted socks. However, even in the play, there is no reference to any decorative or Aran-type pattern. The socks are identified by the number of stitches, the quote being "it's the second one of the third pair I knitted, and I put up three score stitches, and I dropped four of them".

== Aran production today ==
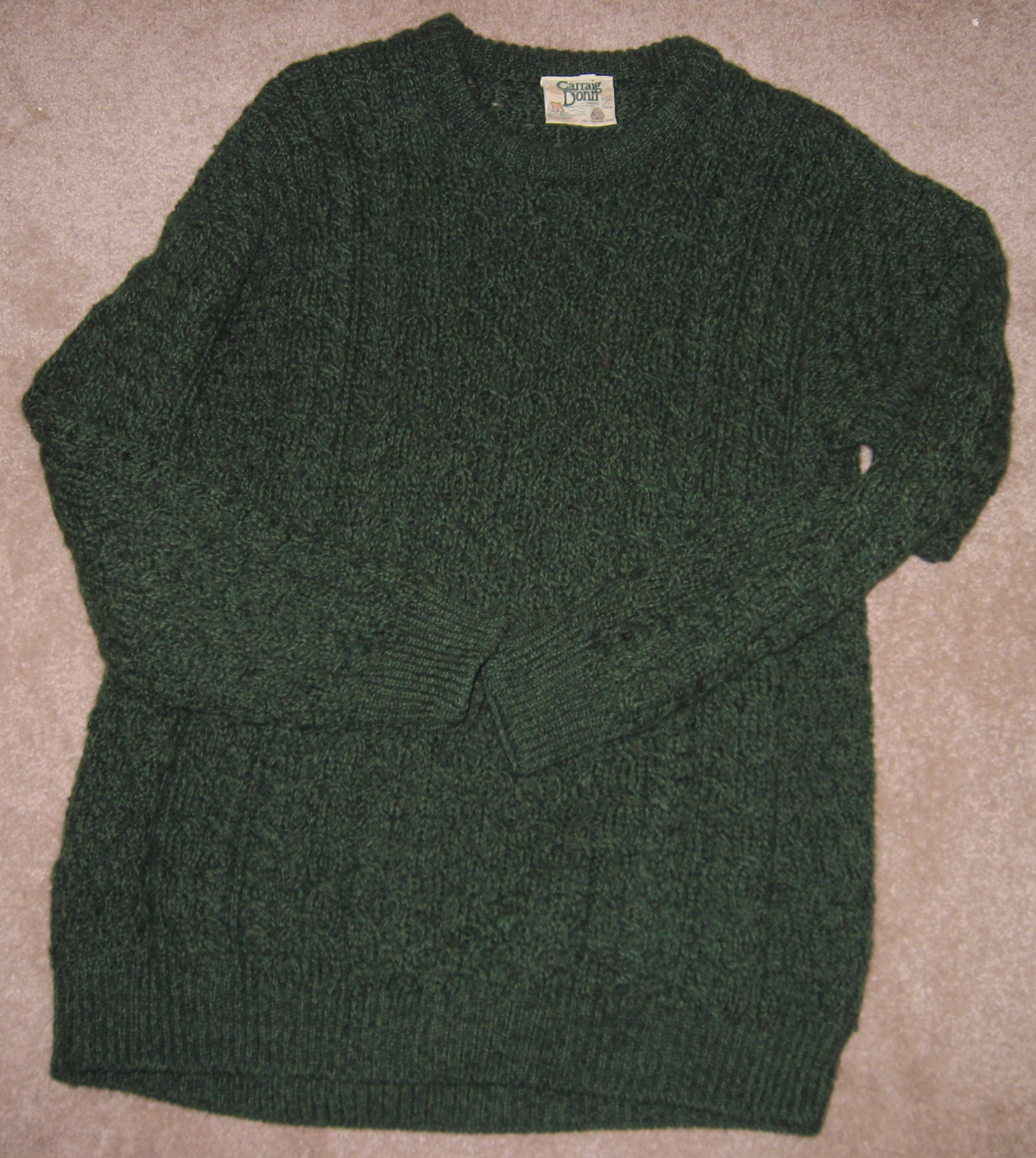
A green Aran jumper, made in Ireland

While in the past, the majority of jumpers and other Aran garments were knitted by hand, today the majority of items for sale in Ireland and elsewhere are either machine knitted or produced on a hand loom. There are very few people still knitting jumpers by hand on a commercial basis but hand knitted jumpers are still available at local craft initiatives.

Machine knitted jumpers tend to use finer wool, cotton, or synthetic yarn and have less complex patterns, since many of the traditional stitches cannot be reproduced this way. They are generally flatter, lighter and less substantial, without the pronounced texture of a hand knitted or hand loomed jumper. Machine knitted jumpers will loosen with wear, and so it is advisable to buy one size smaller than the size of the sweater usually worn. They are the least expensive option. Hand-looming allows more complicated stitches to be used, will have fewer stitches to the inch and be thicker. The best quality hand-loomed jumpers are almost indistinguishable from hand knit. Hand knitted jumpers tend to be more tightly knitted, to have more complex stitch patterns and to be longer-lasting and they attract a significant price premium. By holding them up to light, the difference between the machine knit and hand knit is evident.

== See also ==
- Aran knitting patterns
