= Pick up stitches (knitting) =

Knitting technique

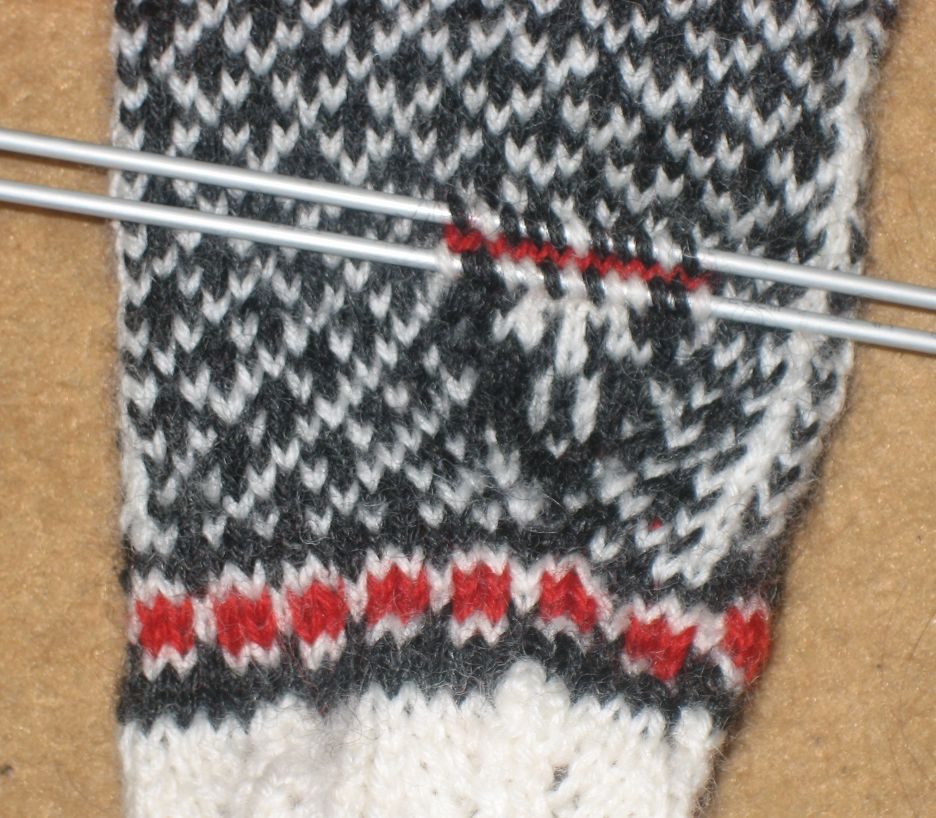
Picking up stitches to make the thumb of a mitten.

In knitting, picking up stitches means adding stitches to the knitting needle that were previously bound off or belong to the selvage.

Picking up stitches is commonly done in knitting garments, e.g. in knitting the collar or sleeves, and is essential for entrelac knitting.

== Uses ==
Picking up stitches is usually used to create a new fabric that is not worked in the same direction as the piece to which it is joined, without having to knit the new piece separately and sew it on. In this application it is most familiar for knitting ribbed button bands for cardigans, but it can also be used to e.g. knit sleeves onto an existing body or add an afterthought thumb to mittens, and entrelac uses the technique to form rows of squares that are worked perpendicularly to those above and below.

It can also be used to provide stability, as when a garment pattern instructs the knitter to bind off at the collar and then immediately pick up the same number of stitches; the bound-off edge helps keep the collar from stretching.

== Technique ==
Picking up stitches uses the same action as regular knitting, save that the loop through which the new stitch passes is not "live"; that is, it will not run if dropped from the needle. Some knitters prefer to pick up all the loops onto the left needle at once, and then knit across in a relatively normal fashion; others pick up each new stitch individually as they work.

Picking up is normally done from the front as if knitting, or from the back as if purling. If purled from the front or knitted from the back, the ridge created will show on the public side of the work; this should be done only if the designer intends it to be a design element.

== Gauge issues ==
When picking up to work in the same direction as the established fabric, as from a bound-off edge, the knitter can simply pick up one new stitch for every column of extant stitches. However, knitting stitches are usually wider than they are tall; when picking up on a selvage, as for a button band, creating the same number of stitches as there are rows will lead to the new fabric ruffling rather than lying flat. As a rule of thumb, picking up three stitches for every four rows will avert this problem. When the main fabric is in garter stitch, one picked-up stitch for every garter ridge (i.e. two rows) will generally suffice.
