= Aran knitting patterns =

Patterns named after Irish islands

Aran knitting patterns are heavily textured knitting patterns which are named after the Aran Islands, which are located off the west coast of Ireland from County Galway and County Clare. The patterns are knitted into socks, hats, vests, scarves, mittens, afghans, pillow covers, and, most commonly, sweaters.

== History ==
The first known example of Aran knitting appeared in the 1930s.

The stitches that create the Aran knitting patterns are complex and the knitted goods are time-consuming to create. For example, a typical Aran sweater will have over 100,000 stitches, and may take several months to finish. The three dimensional effect of the twisted stitches also increased the warmth of the clothing by creating air pockets.

Contrary to popular mythology, Aran knitting patterns were never used to assist in identifying dead fishermen who washed up onshore after accident at sea. This story appears to have been derived from John Millington Synge's play, Riders to the Sea, in which a character is identified by means of stitches dropped in error in a pair of plain socks knitted by his sister.

== Meanings of the stitches ==
The idea that there are meanings associated with the stitches used in Aran knitting derives from Sacred History of Knitting, an entirely fabricated book written by Heinz Edgar Kiewe. Kiewe, a self-styled 'textile journalist' who ran a yarn shop in Oxford, purchased one of the first Aran-style sweaters and, noting a chance similarity between the patterns and ancient Irish illuminated manuscripts, began describing the stitchwork in these terms. Before long, his fanciful descriptions were being used to market the sweater abroad, particularly within the Irish Diaspora in the United States, and it became an accepted part of the sweater's lore that the knitting patterns were developed in ancient times, that each stitch pattern had an associated, usually Christian meaning, and that each family on the Aran Islands had its own clan Aran. However, actual historical documentation, including some of the oldest photography shot in Ireland, are at odds with this mythology.

Nevertheless, knitters may find the following meanings entertaining and inspiring.

The meanings of some of these stitches have been embellished in recent times since the knitting became a commercial enterprise.

=== Cable stitch ===
The cable stitch, which is the most common type of stitch seen on Aran sweaters, is said to represent a fisherman's ropes. There are many different type of cable stitches. The technique for cabling, which involves crossing one stitch over another is one of the easier stitches.

The row on which the stitches crossed over each other is known as the turning row. After the turning row, several plain rows are worked, followed by another turning row. Standard cables have the same number of plain rows between turning rows as there are stitches in the cable.

=== Diamond stitch ===
The diamond stitch supposedly symbolises the small fields on the islands. These fields were worked intensively by local farmers, and this stitch may be said to represent hopes of good luck, success and wealth in farming on the Aran Islands. Diamond patterns might also represent the fishing nets.

=== Zig Zag stitch ===
Zig zag stitches, sometimes known as Marriage Lines, can be used to represent the typical highs and low of matrimony and marriage life. They are may also be used to represent the twisting cliff paths that are on the islands.

=== Honeycomb stitch ===
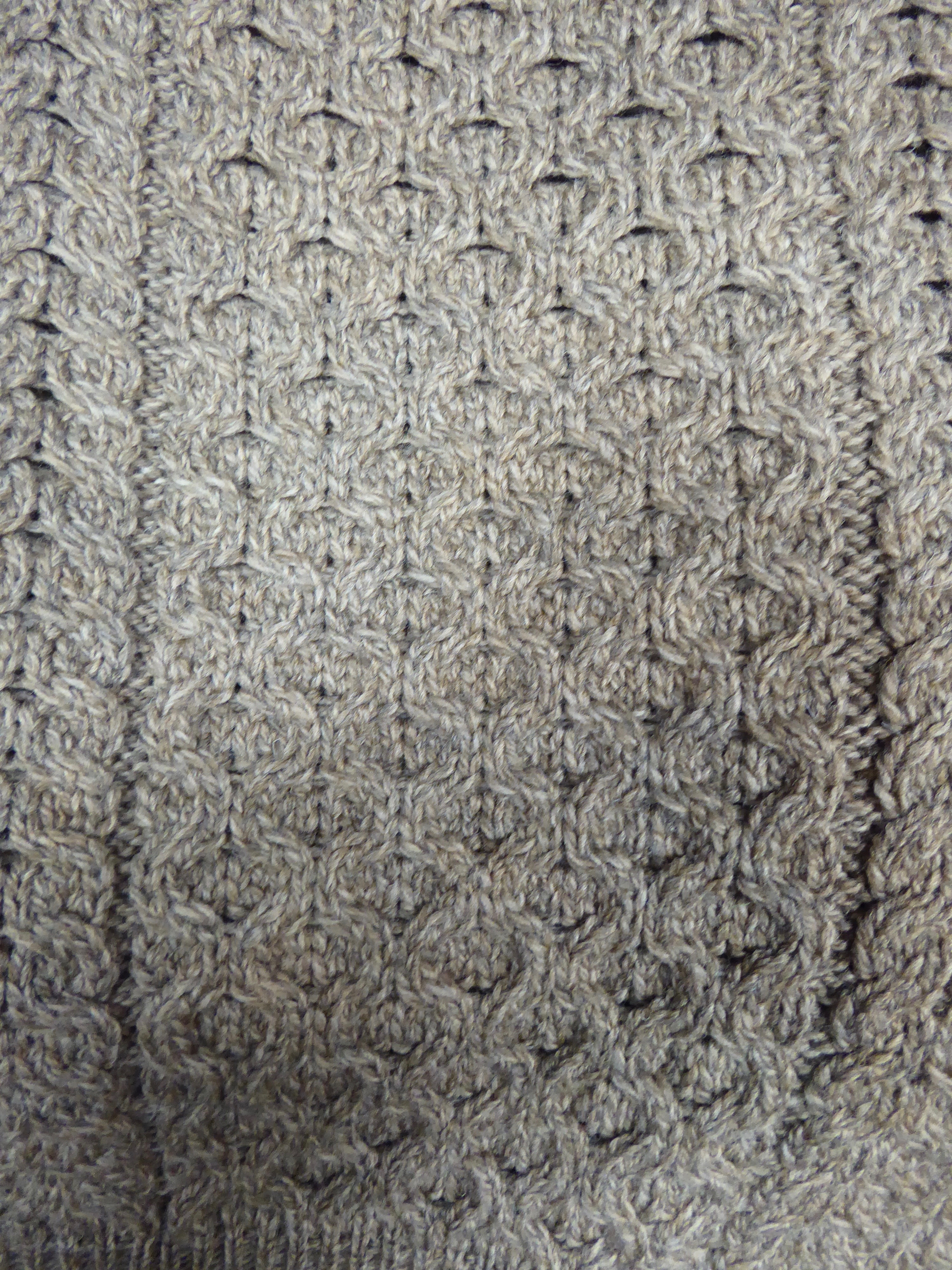
Centre panel in Honeycomb stitch

In Aran knitting patterns the honeycomb stitch, signifying the bee, is often used to represent both hard work and its rewards. The honeycomb stitch may be included as a symbol of good luck, signifying plenty.

When only one repetition of the pattern is used, the honeycomb stitch is also known as the Chain Cable.

=== Trellis stitch ===
Trellis stitch recalls the stone-walled fields of the Northwestern farming communities, in the upland areas in Ireland where rock outcrops naturally or large stones exist in quantity in the soil such as in the Aran Islands. The stitch is useful for adding dimension, and might be used as a symbol of protection.

=== Tree of Life stitch ===
The Tree of Life stitch is frequently used as a motif of rites of passage, and of the importance of family. It is sometimes given a religious significance, symbolising a pilgrims path to salvation. This stitch is also known as the Trinity stitch.

== Aran knitting patterns in modern times ==
Aran knitting patterns are very adaptable, and are widely used in many types of knitted items, including hats, scarves, skirts, and even decorative pillows. The recent revival of interest in handcrafts has led to many modern variations of both stitches and designs. The original sweaters were typically boxy, with saddle sleeves, knit flat and sewn together; however, many modern designs are knit in the round with little or no sewing, and are frequently fitted by clever manipulation of the stitch patterns.

Today, the patterns are being used by knitters around the world, and the sweaters have become an Irish export commodity.

Due to the success of cheap imports from the Far East from the 1970s onward, both the Irish woollen industry and the associated cottage knitting industry in Ireland which supplied hand-knit Aran-style items to the market were all but destroyed, and today only a few mills and handknitters continue the tradition. As a result, a hand-knit Aran sweater can be quite expensive, and may well be worked in wool and yarn blends imported from overseas.
