= Selvage (knitting) =

The selvage of a knitted fabric consists of the stitch(es) that end each row ("course") of knitting. Also called selvedge, the term derives from "self-edge". The selvage may be considered finished; it may also be used in seaming garments, or finished and reinforced using crochet or other techniques. There are many methods for producing selvages.

A selvage may be single (consists of one stitch) and double (consists of two stitches). Wider side edgings are generally classified as borders.

== See also ==
- Selvage
