= Right-angle weave =

Bead weaving technique

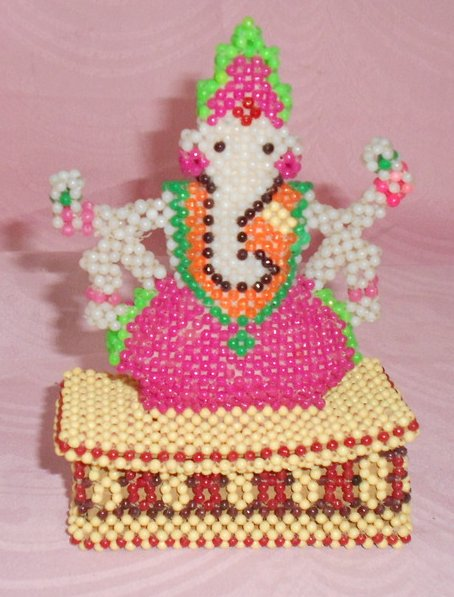
A three-dimensional Ganesha figure from beads made using right-angle weave stitch.

Right-angle weave stitch, also known as RAW, is an off-loom bead weaving technique. Beads are stitched together with thread only making right angle turns, hence the name. The result is an almost fabric like piece of beadwork. Right-angle weave can be woven with either one needle or two. With single needle right-angle weave, the thread path moves in a figure-eight pattern. For double needle right-angle weave, the threads cross each other along the center bead of each stitch as they head in opposite directions. RAW can be formed into flat pieces, tubes, or 3 dimensional figures. There are also variations on the basic stitch like cubic right angle weave (CRAW) and prismatic right angle weave (PRAW). Seed beads, fire polished beads and crystal beads are common choices in pieces using right-angle weave.

== History ==
RAW is said to have originated somewhere in Africa, but examples can be found in beadwork from many cultures, including Philippines, New Guinea and England.

== Use ==
Bead artists are known to use right-angle weave stitch to cover three-dimensional forms, such as vases, beads and other objects.

== See also ==
- Brick stitch
- Square stitch
- Peyote stitch
