= Beadwork =

Decoration technique

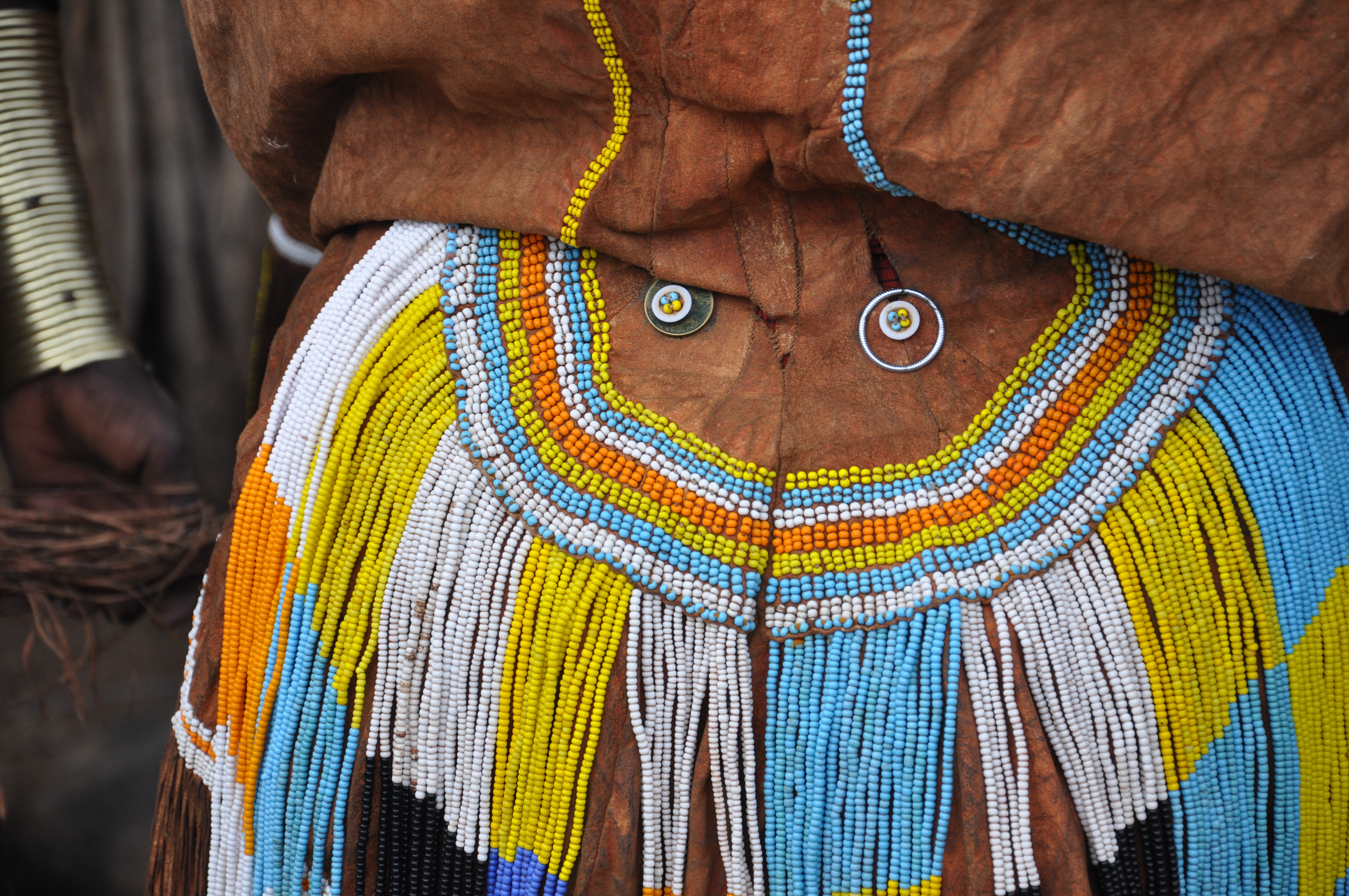
Beadwork on the ceremonial dress of a Datooga woman

Beadwork is the art or craft of attaching beads to one another by stringing them onto a thread or thin wire with a sewing or beading needle or sewing them to cloth. Beads are produced in a diverse range of materials, shapes, and sizes, and vary by the kind of art produced. Most often, beadwork is a form of personal adornment (e.g. jewelry), but it also commonly makes up other artworks.

Beadwork techniques are broadly divided into several categories, including loom and off-loom weaving, stringing, bead embroidery, bead crochet, bead knitting, and bead tatting.

== Ancient beading ==
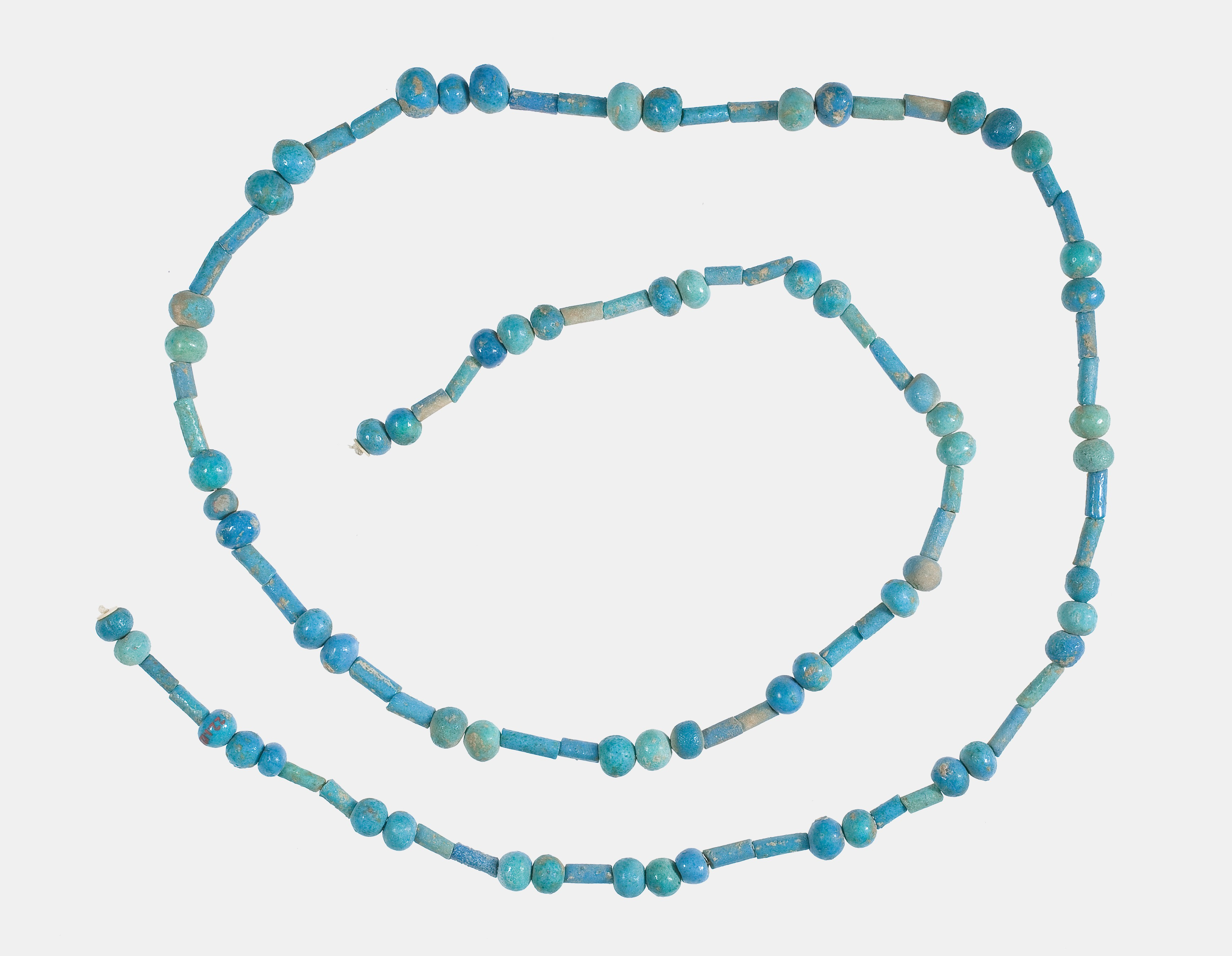
A string of blue faience beads from north Lisht, a village in the Memphite region of Egypt, c. 1802–1450 B.C.

The art of creating and utilizing beads is ancient, and ostrich shell beads discovered in Africa can be carbon-dated to 10,000 BC. Faience beads, a type of ceramic created by mixing powdered clays, lime, soda, and silica sand with water until a paste forms, then molding it around a stick or straw and firing until hard, were notably used in ancient Egyptian jewelry from the First Dynasty (beginning in the early Bronze Age) onward. Faience and other ceramic beads with vitrified quartz coatings predate pure glass beads.

Beads and work created with them were found near-ubiquitously across the ancient world, often made of locally available materials. For example, the Athabaskan peoples of Alaska used tusk shells (scaphopod mollusks), which are naturally hollow, as beads and incorporated them into elaborate jewelry.

Beadwork has historically been used for religious purposes, as good luck talismans, for barter and trade, and for ritual exchange.

== Modern beading ==
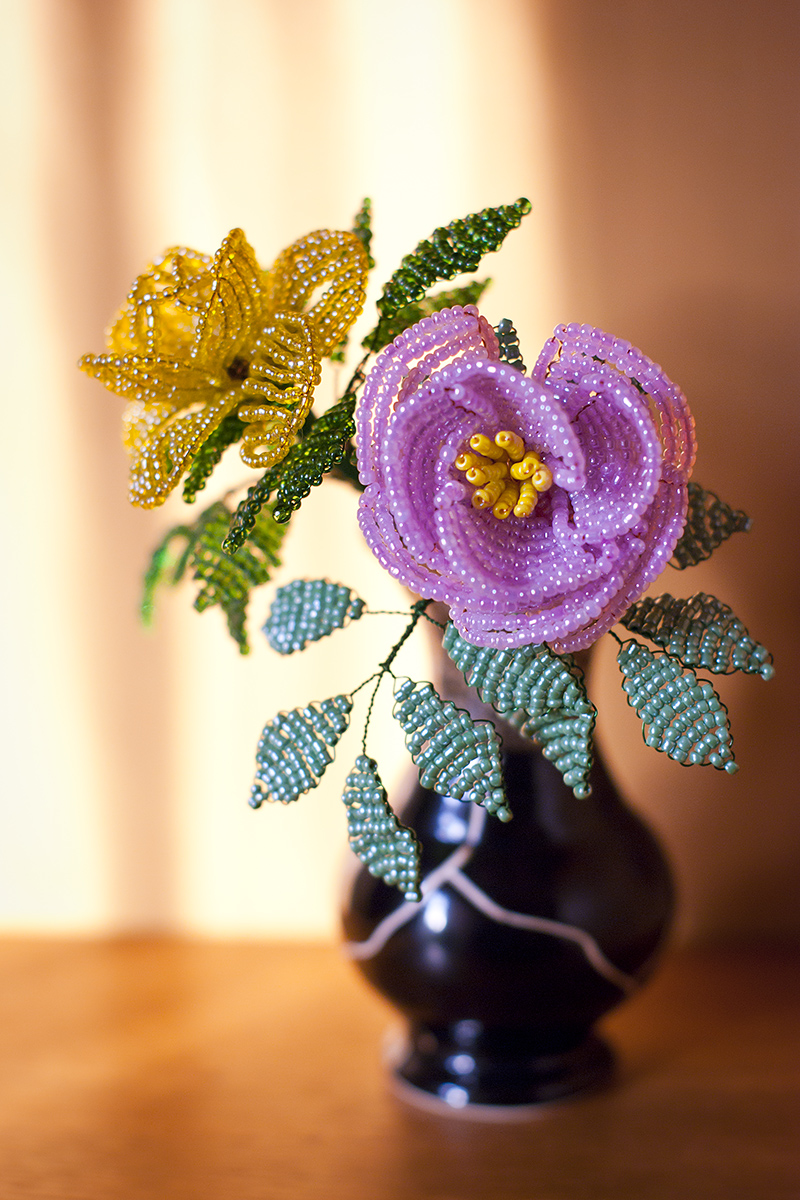
Modern beaded flowers, yellow made in the French beading technique and pink in the Victorian beading technique.

Today, beadwork is commonly practiced by jewelers, hobbyists, and contemporary artists; artists known for using beadwork as a medium include Liza Lou, Ran Hwang, Hew Locke, Jeffery Gibson, and Joyce J. Scott.

Some ancient stitches have become especially popular among contemporary artists. The off-loom peyote stitch, for example, is used in Native American Church members' beadwork.

Jewelry made of beads was widespread and fashionable in Western Ukraine, which was connected with the familiarity of Ukrainian artists with the artistic achievements of the countries of Western Europe, where from the 18th century. There was a fashion for artistic products made of beads. Modern Ukrainian beadwork includes: beaded clothing, collars, bracelets, necklaces, necklaces-gerdanes, clothing accessories, and household items such as pysanka.

== Europe ==
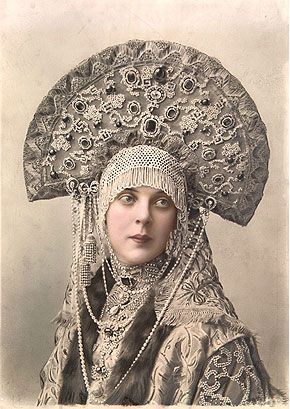
Russian Countess Olga Orlova-Davydova wearing a heavily beaded kokoshnik, 1903

Beadwork in Europe, much like in Egypt and the Americas, can be traced to the use of bone and shell as adornments amongst early modern humans. As glassmaking increased in popularity through the Middle Ages, glass beads began to appear extensively in bead embroidery, beaded necklaces, and similar wares.

In Northern Russia, the kokoshnik headdress typically includes river pearl netting around the forehead in addition to traditional bead embroidery.

By 1291, artists in Murano, Italy had begun production of intricate glass Murano beads inspired by Venetian glassware. With the advent of lampwork glass, Europeans started producing seed beads for embroidery, crochet, and other, mostly off-loom techniques. Czech seed beads are among the most popular contemporary bead styles.

One technique of European beadwork is beaded "immortal" flowers. The technique's origins, though indistinct, are generally agreed to range at least several centuries back, as far back as at least the 16th if not 14th century. Two major styles were developed: French beading, in which the wire only goes through each bead once and the wires are arranged vertically, and Victorian (also called English or Russian) beading, in which the wires go through each bead twice and are arranged horizontally. In the late 19th and early 20th century, the beaded flowers were used to create long lasting funeral wreaths, called immortelles (French for "immortals"). In the mid-20th century, the art was introduced to United States with sales of flower beading kits. In 1960s to 1970s, books by emerging beaded flower designers emerged. In the 1990s and 2000s, there was another revival of interest in the craft, exemplified for example by the funeral wreaths made to commemorate victims of the September 11 attacks.

Ukrainian masters develop exclusively national motifs in their bead collections. Beaded artworks include clothing ensembles, clothing accessories, priestly clothing decorations, and household items. At the beginning of the 20th century embroidery workshops were created on the territory of Galicia and Bukovyna, where, along with weaving and embroidery, jewelry from beads was made. Contemporary beadwork includes: beaded clothing, collars, bracelets, necklaces, clothing accessories like handbags and purses.

== North America ==
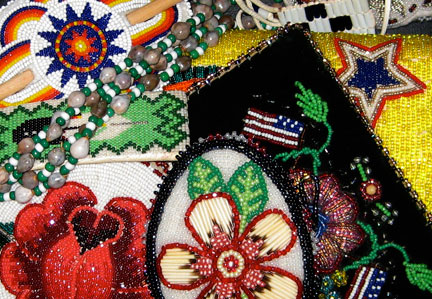
Examples of contemporary Native American beadwork

Native American beadwork, already established via the use of materials like shells, dendrite, claws, and bone, evolved to incorporate glass beads as Europeans brought them to the Americas beginning in the early 17th century.

Native beadwork today heavily utilizes small glass beads, but artists also continue to use traditionally important materials. Wampum shells, for instance, are ceremonially and politically important to a range of Eastern Woodlands tribes, and are used to depict important events.

Several Native American artists from a wide range of nations are considered to be at the forefront of modern American bead working. These artists include Teri Greeves (Kiowa, known for beaded commentaries on Native voting rights), Marcus Amerman (Choctaw, known for realistic beaded portraits of historical figures and celebrities), and Jamie Okuma (Luiseño-Shoshone-Bannock, known for beaded dolls).

=== Great Lakes tribes ===
Ursuline nuns in the Great Lakes introduced floral patterns to young Indigenous women, who quickly applied them to beadwork. Ojibwe women in the area created ornately decorated shoulder bags known as gashkibidaagan (bandolier bags).

The Anishinaabe in the Great Lakes region use beading to share stories about the traditions and culture of the tribe. There are 7 core teachings from the Teachings of the Seven Grandfathers that the Anishinaabe people embody in their culture, storytelling, and beadwork: Wisdom, love, respect, bravery, honesty, humility, and truth.

=== Eastern Woodlands tribes ===
Innu, Mi'kmaq, Penobscot, and Haudenosaunee peoples developed, and are known for, beading symmetrical scroll motifs, most often in white beads. Tribes of the Iroqouis Confederacy practice raised beading, where threads are pulled taut to force beads into a bas-relief, which creates a three-dimensional effect.

=== Southeastern tribes ===
Southeastern tribes pioneered a beadwork style that features images with white outlines, a visual reference to the shells and pearls coastal Southeasterners used pre-contact. This style was nearly lost during the Trail of Tears, as many beadworkers died during their forced removal to Indian Territory west of the Mississippi River. Roger Amerman (Choctaw, brother of Marcus Amerman) and Martha Berry (Cherokee) have effectively revived the style, however.

=== Sierra Madre tribes ===
Huichol communities in the Mexican states of Jalisco and Nayarit uniquely attach their beads to objects and surfaces via the use of a resin-beeswax mixture (in lieu of wire or waxed thread). Huichol beadwork is commonly characterized by bright colors and geometric shapes, and motifs of animals and spirits illustrate their spiritual beliefs.

=== Métis Nation ===
Métis were known as the Flower Beadwork People by the Cree and Dene because of their culture of colourful floral beadwork and embroidery. During the early 19th century, European and Euro-North American observers and travelers frequently noted the intricate beadwork adorning Métis clothing. This beadwork, particularly floral patterns, has evolved into one of the most recognizable symbols of Métis culture. Métis artisans employed First Nations beadwork techniques along with floral designs influenced by French-Canadian nuns in Roman Catholic missions. By the 1830s, vibrant and lifelike floral motifs dominated Métis creations from the Red River region. Beadwork adorned nearly every traditional Métis garment, from moccasins to coats, belts to bags. The practice of beadwork became a vital economic activity for Métis women and families, spanning generations and providing both personal and commercial expression. Métis organizations like the Louis Riel Institute and the Gabriel Dumont Institute actively promote and preserve traditional beading through workshops and resources, ensuring its continuation within the community.

== East Asia ==
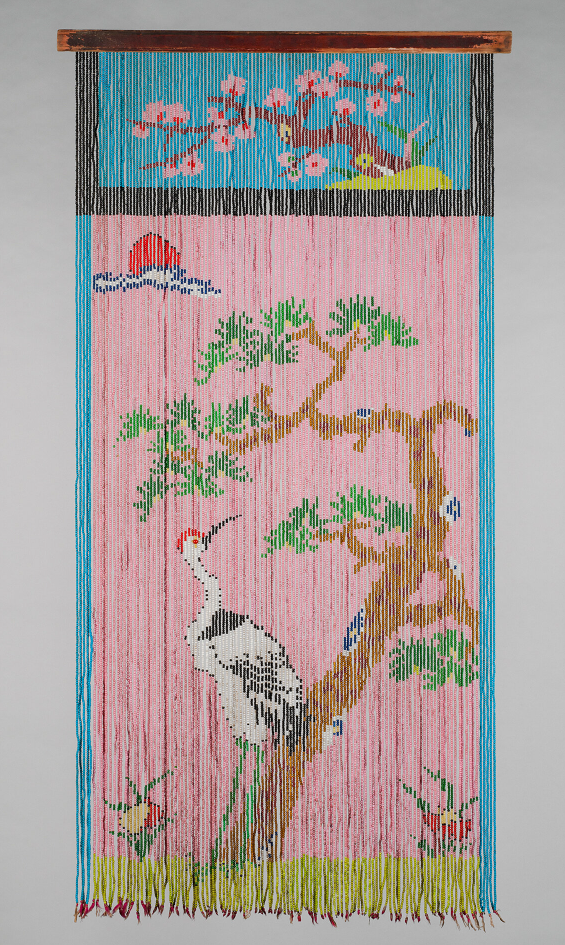
Chinese bead curtain, dating back to the 20th century. Pictures a crane in front of a pine tree, looking at the sun through its branches. Notable that pink was considered a rare color.

Aside from jewelry and apparel bead work, bead curtains made a rise in the 1960-1970's. Bead curtains root back to as early as the 20th century in China, where they were known for the positive energy that they shared. They typically consist of a horizontal pole or piece of wood that has rows of string dangling vertically, each string adorned with beads from top to bottom. These curtains provide a sense of separation between rooms and sometimes to deflect insects along with their decorative qualities. They often fall under the category of 'screen' alongside cloth, stone, or wood, though offer a completely different sensory experience while passing through them.

In both Chinese and Japanese glass bead curtains, they're inscribed with important messages; they often deal with auspicious factors like 'double happiness' and immortality. Common iconography, which was created by hanging the beads in a certain pattern, included suns and cranes, to signify happiness and peace.

While there's no physical evidence of these existing before the 20th century, early bead curtains were found to be made of jade, agate, shell, serpentine, faience, glass, bamboo tubes, wood and seeds. They were originally referred to as knotted bead nets or corpse curtains, as they often served as a rank of wealth when an individual was buried. Although pearl and crystal curtains gained popularity around the same time, they were often mistaken for glass bead curtains due to looks. Historical texts indicate that pearl curtains were made from real pearls, although we lack any substantial evidence.

== Africa ==
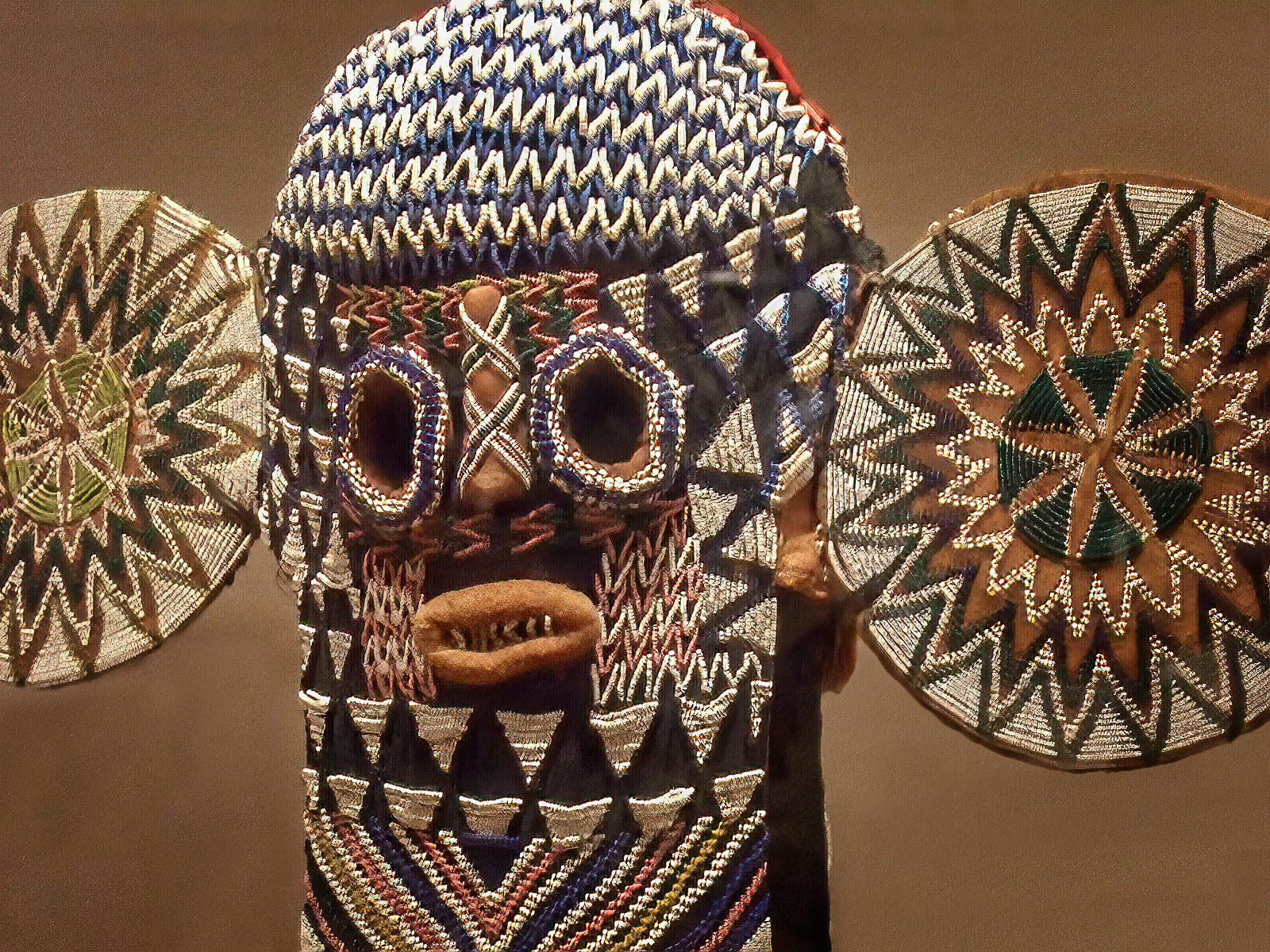
An elephant mask decorated with glass beads by the Bamileke people in Bandjoun, Cameroon c. 1910–1930

Several African nations outside of Egypt have beadwork traditions.

Aggry (also spelled aggri or aggrey) beads, a type of decorated glass bead, are used by Ghanaians and other West Africans to make necklaces and bracelets that may be traded for other goods. These beads are often believed to have spiritual and medicinal qualities impacting fertility and women's power. Ahuhuani and Egyinamoani beads are also glass beads that are used by Ghanaians, specifically the Akan people. They are used to make charms and are worn by pregnant women to protect their pregnancy from malevolent spiritual energies.

In Mauritania, powder-glass Kiffa beads represent a beading tradition that may date as far back as 1200 CE; a group of women have been revitalizing the craft after the last traditional Kiffa artisans died in the 1970s.

Cameroonian women are known for crafting wooden sculptures covered in beadwork.

Stringing is a type of beadwork technique where beads are put on a string and can be done in a step-by-step approach. This type of technique is commonly used by the Yoruba people and is seen as a core foundation of their art compositions. Glass beads were also used by the Yoruba people along with other materials such as cloth, cardboard, thread, and iron. Colors used in Yoruba beadwork are picked from their chromatic scheme that is based on the feelings brought upon certain temperatures. These colors can reveal information about the piece such as the status of the person the beadwork may have been made for, or commentary on concepts and issues that may have been going on during the time.

Northern and Southern Ndebele people use white and colorful glass beads to create pieces of clothing from beadwork such as loincloths, liphotos, and headdresses. Before wearing articles of clothing, Ndebele children wear beads first. Ndebele newborns wear white beads around their waists. This is said to bring good luck.

== See also ==
- Glass beadmaking
- Beadweaving
