= Bead embroidery =

Embroidery using beads as embellishments

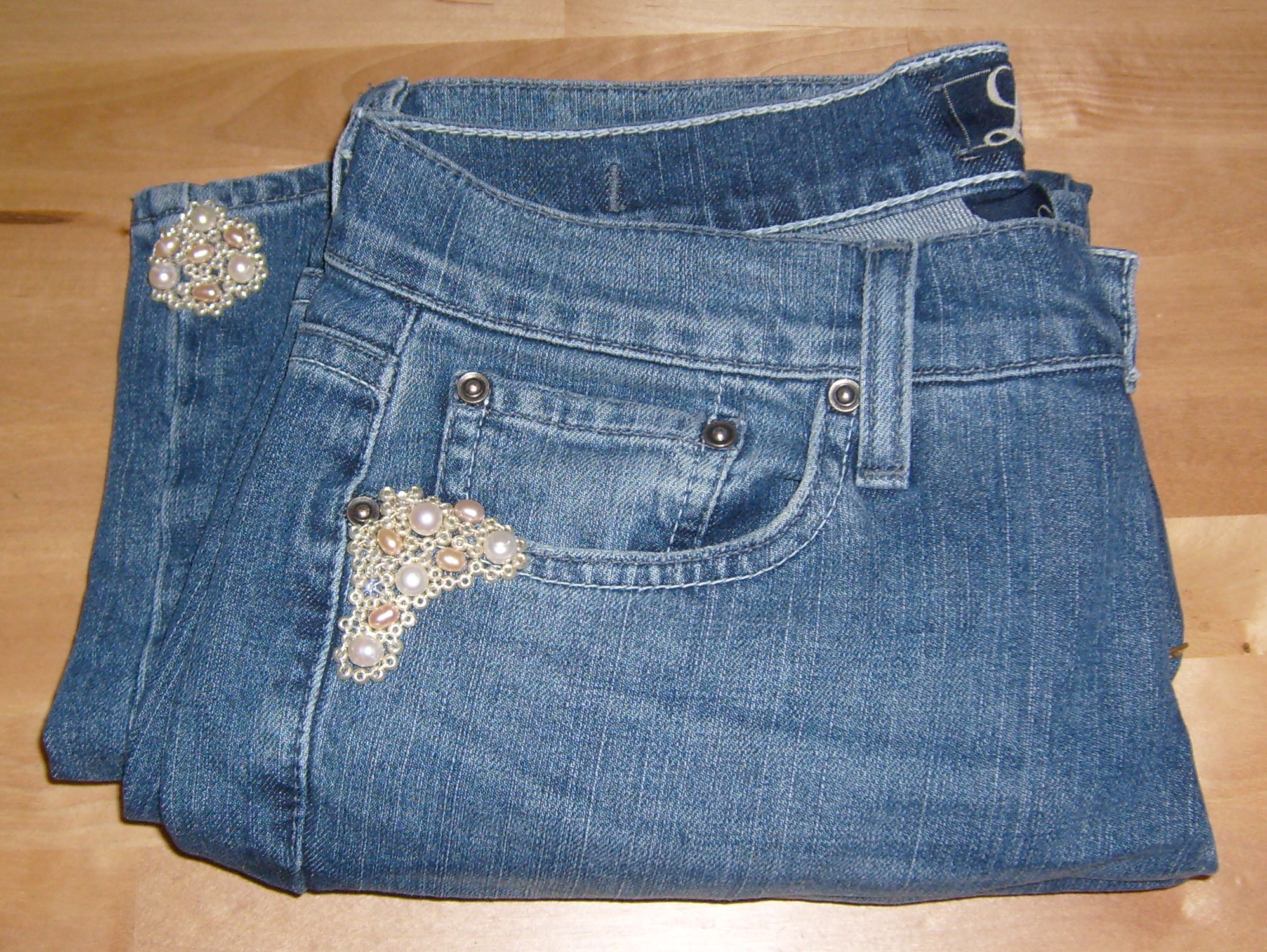
A pair of denim jeans embroidered with freshwater pearls and seed beads

Bead embroidery is a type of beadwork that uses a needle and thread to stitch beads to a surface of fabric, suede, or leather.

Bead embroidery is an embellishment that does not form an essential part of a textile's structure. In this respect, bead embroidery differs from bead weaving, bead crochet, and bead knitting. Woven, knitted, and crocheted beads may be attached during fabric production, whereas embroidered beads are always added upon finished fabric.

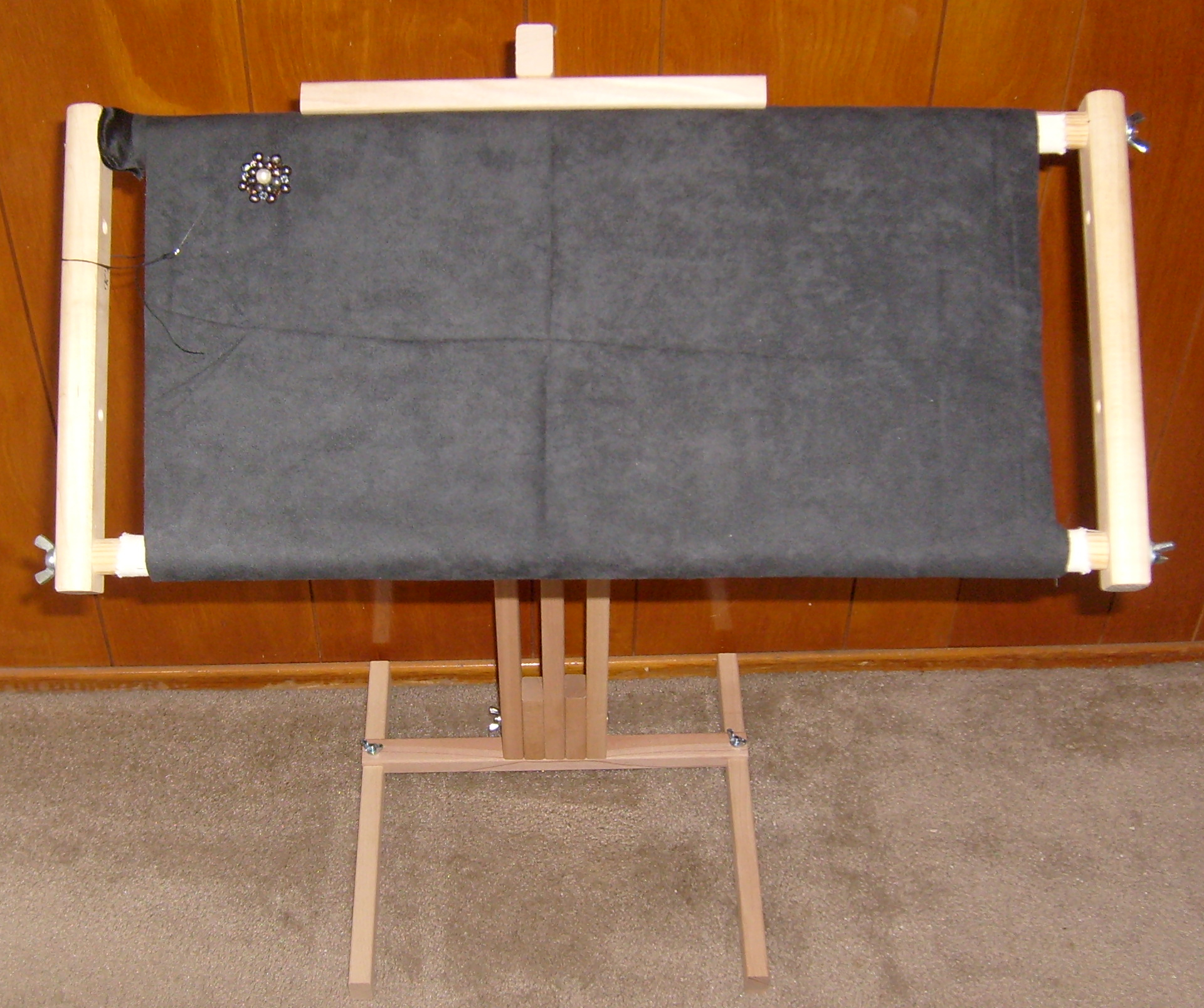
Bead embroidery during construction: a brooch in pearl and lead crystal on ultrasuede, attached to a scroll frame.

Traditionally, bead embroidery has been used on clothing and decorative textiles. It may be used in jewelry with the addition of structural supports such as bracelet bands. Other clothing accessories such as belt buckles and handbags can be embroidered with beads, and household items such as pillows or boxes may be embellished with bead embroidery. When used with hard surfaces, bead patterns are measured and planned with seam allowances and attached after embroidery by means of glue or epoxy.

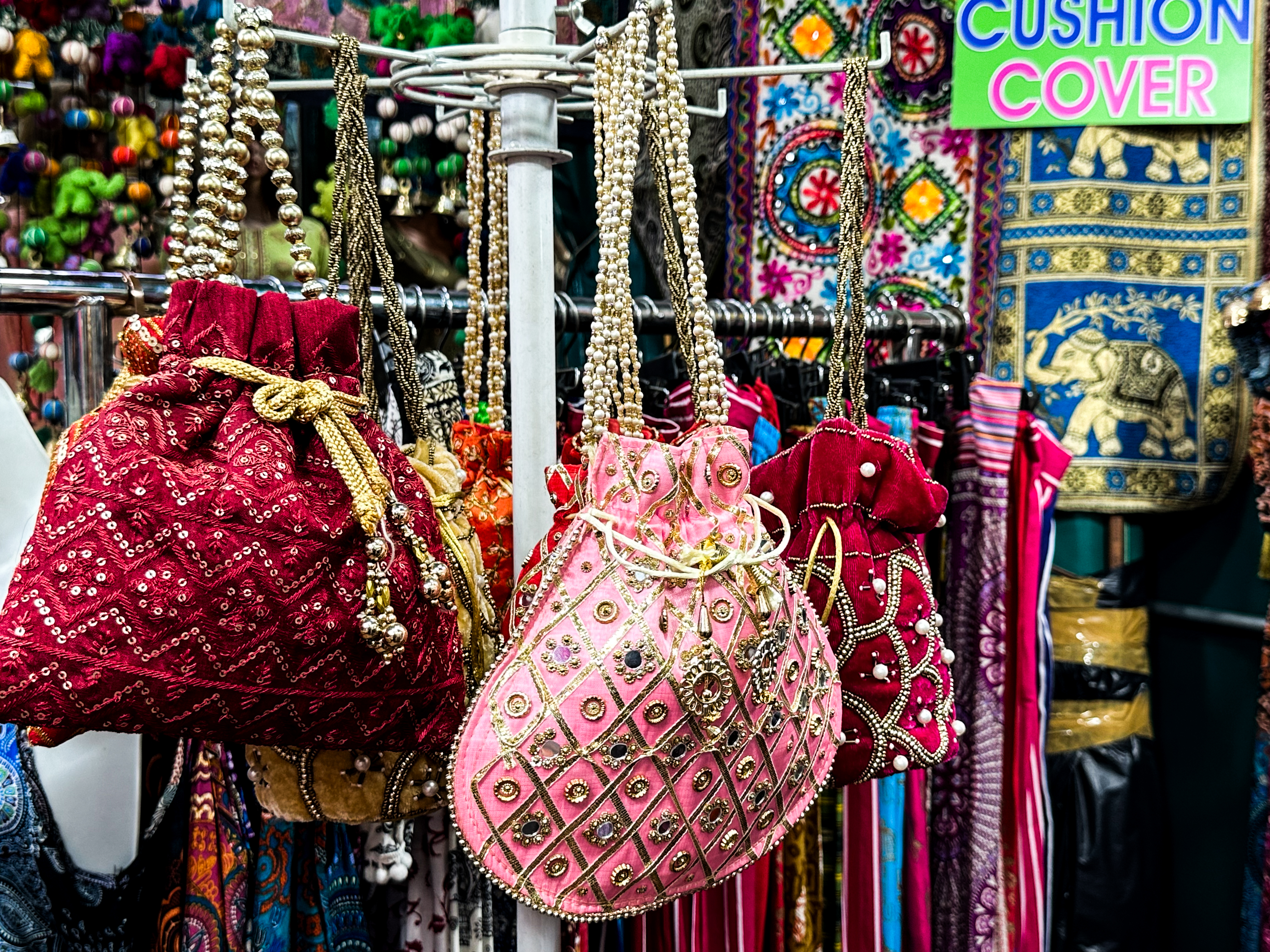
Traditional handcrafted small pouch or drawstring purse often called Batuas or Potli bags.

Bead embroidery has historically been a symbol of pride and status. The craft of bead embroidery was often supported by and more economically available to royal patrons. In India, for example, beadwork was incorporated into their fashion, specifically, decorative objects such as batuas, otherwise known as small purses or potli bags. Over time, bead embroidery evolved from being a symbol of elite status to a more widely practiced craft, especially after 1949 when Bhopal State was merged with India which in turn ended the royal patronage of arts and crafts. After the end of royal patronage of crafts surrounding bead embroidery, artisans began to instead market, design, and sell to the common people. Due to the increase in demand, artisans began to expand the variety of the designs. However, the quality of beadwork in items, such as the batuas, began to decline and became simpler over time. In this modern era, bead embroidery majorly faces the problem of sustainability.

== History ==
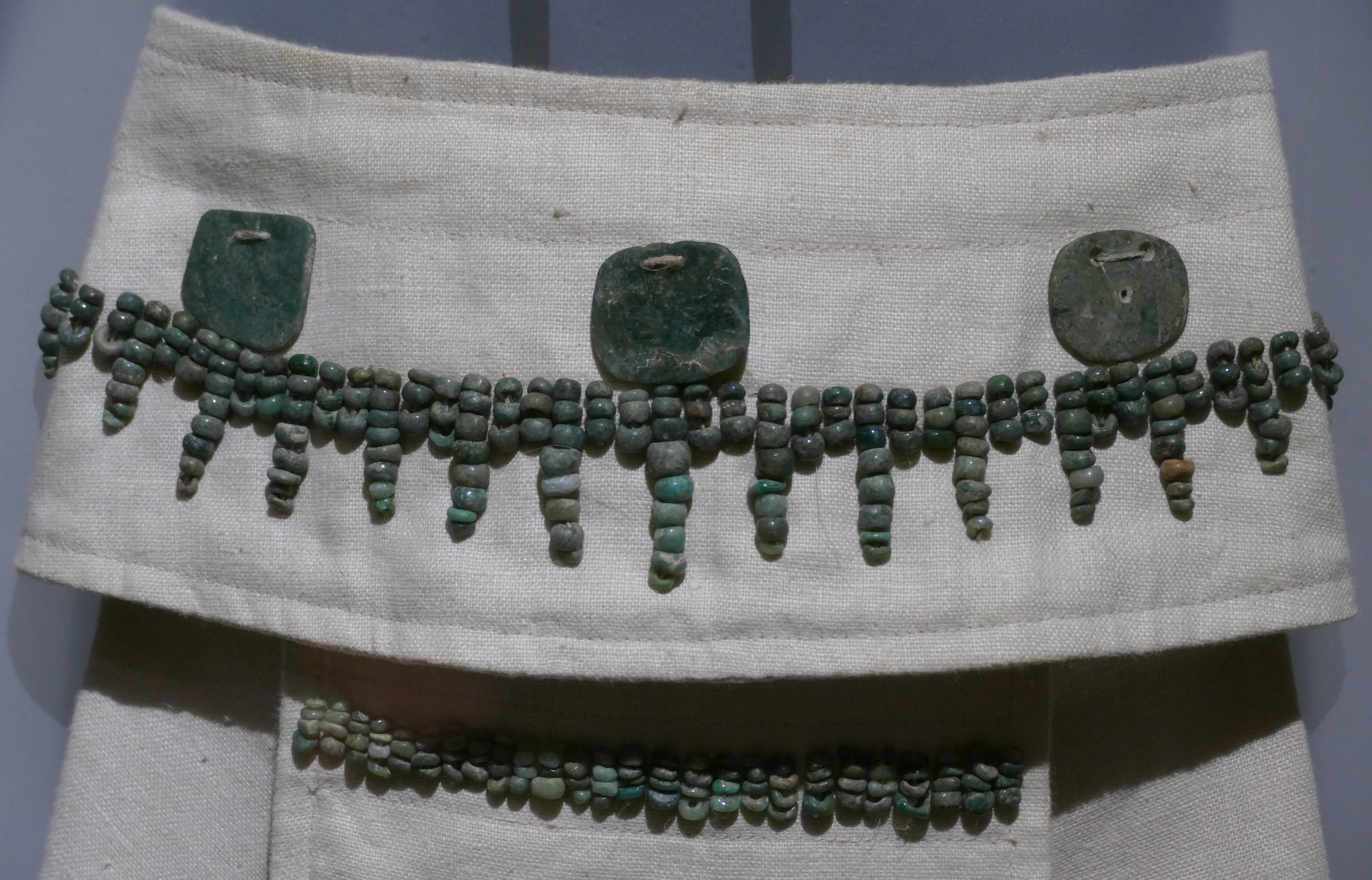
Reconstruction of a Maya belt made from jade beads sewn onto cloth, Calakmul, 660-750 AD

Long before the last major ice age, people were making beads from seashells, seeds, and any other materials they could find. Dating to 2500 BC, the tombs of Ur in Iraq contain beadwork made from Lapis Lazuli beads. The beads were sewn into the base. When archeologists excavated Neolithic burial mounds in Europe they found drawings of crude bone needles. Drawings and paintings from Egypt also show richly embroidered clothes. Bead embroidery is represented in European history dating back to the Middle Ages, with artwork showing bead embroidered hats and clothing.

Indigenous peoples throughout North America have a rich historical relationship with beadwork. With the arrival of Europeans, seed beads began to be used and traded; however, pre-contact traditionally styled beadwork was woven using items which included shells, seeds, and porcupine quills. With the violence of Europeans colonizing America, beading became a way for Native Americans to hold on to their cultural identities. Native Americans used multiple techniques and multiple traditions still continue today. Peyote stitch was taught to Native Americans by Europeans. Loom beading was the last technique to be invented. Within the Americas, bead embroidery was first used by the Native Americans of the Great Lakes region. Native American bead embroidery is also known as applique beadwork.

== Cultural significance ==
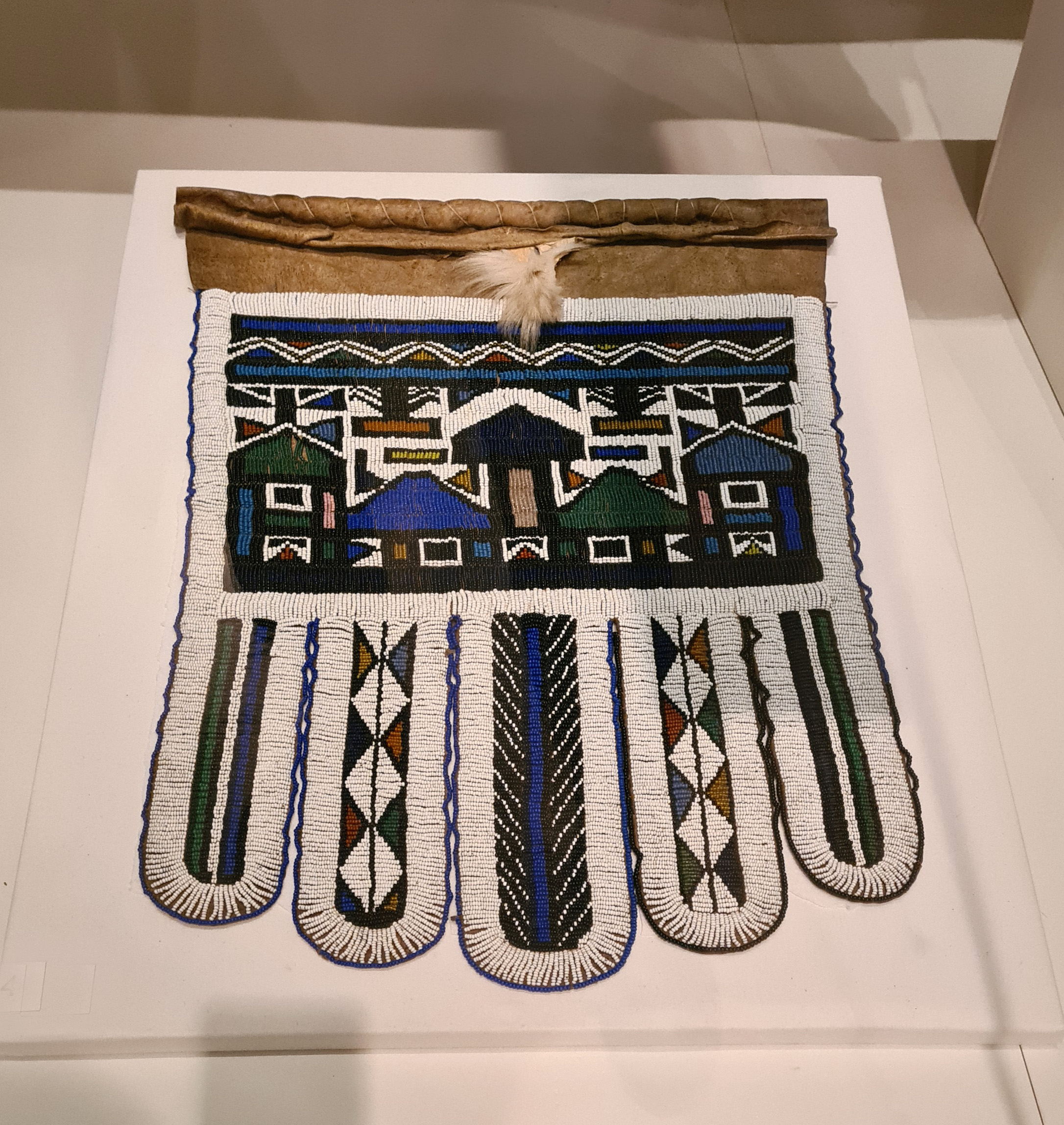
Beaded five panel apron otherwise known as an Itjorholo traditionally worn by married Ndebele woman.

In many different African cultures, beadwork is used as a symbolic language throughout different aspects of their life. Bead embroidery has played a significant role in cultures across the world, serving as more than just an art form or embellishment. Throughout history, beads have been used as a form of communication, identity, and social expression. For example, the Ndebele people of South Africa use different kinds of beadwork to communicate the current life stage of a woman, with articles of clothing like the Isiphephetu, which is an apron traditionally made by a mother or grandmother in an adolescent girl’s family to symbolize her journey into adulthood. Specific colors, patterns, and designs can communicate information such as the age, marital status, and identity of the wearer. For example, Ndebele brides traditionally wear a five-flap apron on ceremonial occasions to represent their marital status. This apron can also be called an Itjorholo, and it is traditionally given to a bride by the groom’s family, with the five flaps representing children and fertility. It is traditionally made of animal skin and decorated by the mother-in-law with tiny white beads and a bold abstract design that reflects the paintings found on the walls of their home. Apart from the different meanings attached to bead embroidery in society, bead-embroidered objects often hold spiritual relevance. Beads have been used as charms, symbols, and ceremonial items, and are often added onto clothing, jewelry, and sacred objects in order to physically represent and symbolize their meaning in their lives. Across different cultures, bead embroidery is not just an artistic practice, but it is also a way of self-expression used to preserve their cultural traditions and values.

== Technique ==
Three basic methods may be used to embroider with beads: individual beads may be sewn directly onto fabric, or several beads may be run through a needle before running through the backing, or else a line of threaded beads may be laid upon a fabric and secured with couching stitches. Many people use a needle and thread to stitch beads to the fabric, usually a fine needle with a small eye to facilitate easier passage through the small holes in many seed beads. A second technique uses a fine hook to chain stitch thread to the fabric; in Europe this technique is known as Tambour or Luneville embroidery, and is commonly used to bead haute couture garments. In India the work is called Zari or Moochi Aari, or just Aari and is used on garments and furnishings. A hallmark of Tambour or Luneville embroidery is that the beads are attached on the underside of the fabric and the chain is formed on the top side of the fabric, whereas in Zari and Aari work, the beads are attached to the top side of the fabric where the chain stitch is formed. In Zari/Aari work the thread is hooked through each bead as the stitches are formed. The Tambour/Aari beading methods appear more difficult to master for those more used to working with a threaded needle but do have an advantage in speed over stitching beads with a needle, increased speed is possible as the thread is used from the spool so is continuous, there is no need to fasten of, cut new thread, thread the needle, and fasten on, secondly With Tambour/Luneville work the beads are strung direct on the thread before stitching begins, so no time is lost placing each bead on the needle. There are multiple YouTube videos examples demonstrating Arri/Zari stitching, and numerous books which instruct on Tambour or Luneville work. Most beading onto fabric is worked with the fabric stretched tightly over a frame, which holds the fabric tight and provides a flat surface to work the embroidery on; beads can add significant weight so some support is important. Using a frame means the embroiderer has both hands free for working. In Tambour or Luneville work the frame is often supported between two tables, above a table or on trestle supports and .used when seated on a chair. In Aari or Zari work the frame is often closer to the ground, and used while seated on the ground. Lesage is acclaimed in the fashion world for the beaded embroideries worked for many well known fashion designers.
