= Joyce J. Scott =

African-American artist (born 1948)

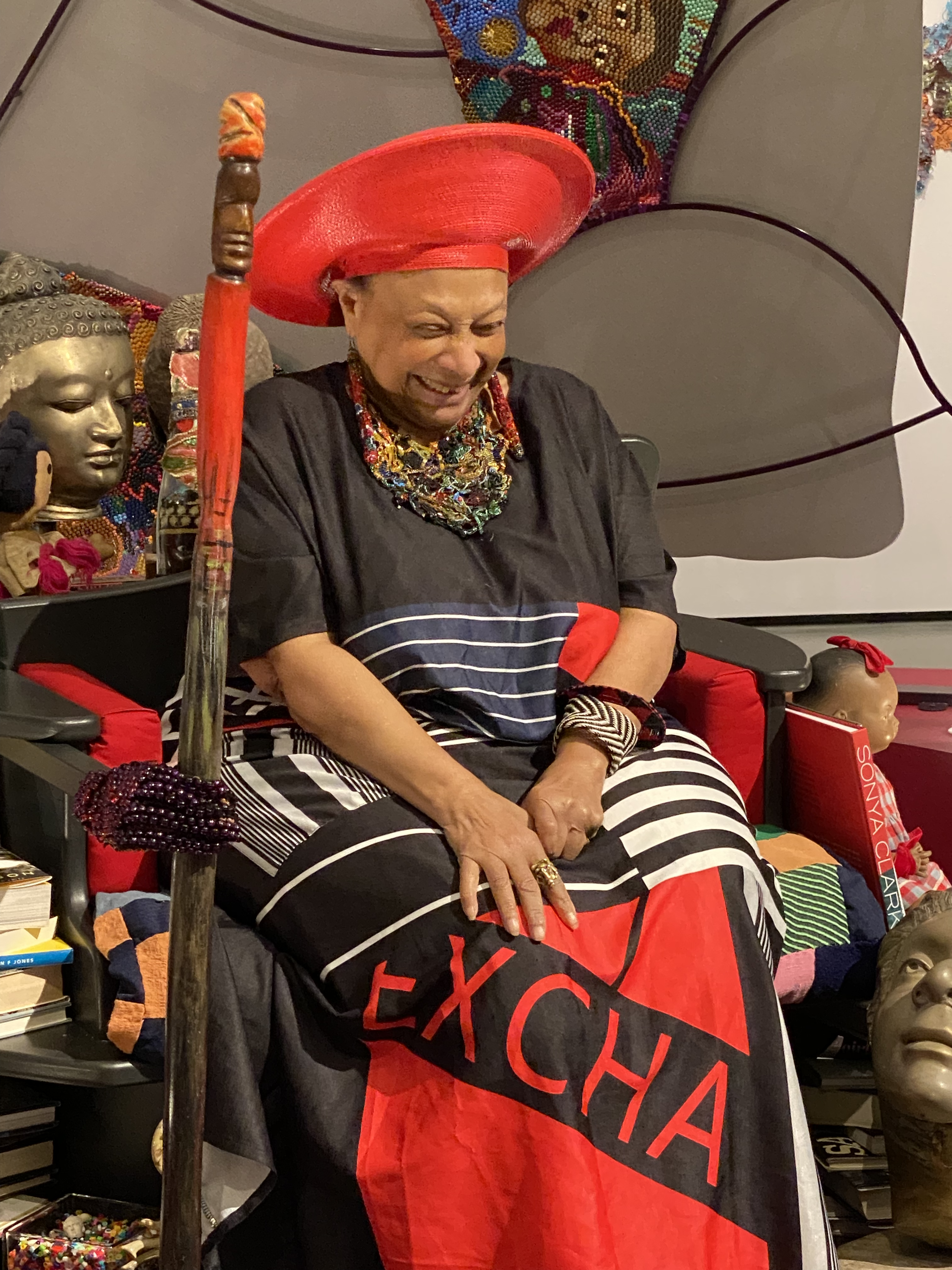
- Scott in March 2024
- Born: Joyce Jane Scott; 1948 (age 77–78); Baltimore, Maryland, US
- Education: Maryland Institute College of Art (BFA); Instituto Allende (MFA)
- Occupations: Artist, sculptor, educcator
- Known for: Contemporary craft, quilting, beadweaving
- Mother: Elizabeth Talford Scott

Joyce J. Scott (born 1948) is an African-American artist, sculptor, quilter, performance artist, installation artist, print-maker, lecturer and educator. Named a MacArthur Fellow in 2016, and a Smithsonian Visionary Artist in 2019, Scott is best known for her figurative sculptures and jewelry using free form, off-loom beadweaving techniques, similar to a peyote stitch. Each piece is often constructed using thousands of glass seed beads or pony beads, and sometimes other found objects or materials such as glass, quilting and leather. In 2018, she was hailed for working in new medium — a mixture of soil, clay, straw, and cement — for a sculpture meant to disintegrate and return to the earth. Scott is influenced by a variety of diverse cultures, including Native American and African traditions, Mexican, Czech, and Russian beadwork, illustration and comic books, and pop culture.

Scott is renowned for her social commentary on issues such as racism, classism, sexism, violence, and cultural stereotypes, as well as themes of spiritual healing. Her work is about how Scott sees herself in a rapidly changing world: "These works are about personal growth, personal epiphanies and how not to get stuck in the easy ways of life- about art I am fairly fearless but in everyday life I am not."

== Biography ==
Joyce Jane Scott was born in Baltimore in 1948, the daughter of noted quilt maker Elizabeth Talford Scott and Charlie Scott Jr. She has described herself as "a true Baltimore babe and Sandtown girl" and has lived in a row house in the Sandtown neighborhood for more than four decades. Her mother encouraged her creativity and Scott began drawing at the Coppin Demonstration School, a public education institution, and later attended Lemmel Middle School and Eastern High School in Baltimore. She graduated with Bachelor of Fine Arts from the Maryland Institute College of Art in 1970, and then earned a Masters of Fine Arts from the Instituto Allende in Mexico. Later, Scott pursued further education at Rochester Institute of Technology in New York and Haystack Mountain School of Crafts in Maine.

Scott's own mother was an artist who taught Scott appliqué quilting techniques and encouraged her to pursue her career as an artist. One of her earliest artistic endeavors was sewing doll clothes. Scott is also influenced by craft traditions in her extended family of "quilters, woodworkers, basketweavers, chair caners, planters and blacksmiths," where people developed skills in more than one craft so that they could survive. Her love of music and deep sense of spirituality solidified in her upbringing in the Pentecostal faith with its rich tradition in gospel music.

Scott's African influences are manifested in her use of intricate and elaborate decoration. By using techniques similar to West African Yoruba beadwork crowns and regalia, she reconfigures beads into a sculptural format. According to scholar Leslie King-Hammond, African arts and tradition functioned to transform every day objects into beautiful decorations.

Scott's practice includes performance in addition to sculpture. Her unapologetically critical and humorous personality is often employed in her performances to critique issues such as feminism, sexism, and racism. Like her jewelry and quilt works, her performance also often addresses storytelling and memory.

Her work was included in the 2024 exhibition Making Their Mark: Works from the Shah Garg Collection at the Berkeley Art Museum and Pacific Film Archive (BAMPFA). The same year the Baltimore Museum of Art held a retrospective of Scott's work entitled Joyce J. Scott: Walk a Mile in My Dreams.

== Featured exhibitions ==
=== I-con-nobody/I-con-o-graphy ===
Held at the Corcoran Gallery of Art in 1991, this was Scott's first major solo exhibition. "The title implied the telling of truths, both the straightforward and symbolic kinds. Iconography, the symbols that explain images, and, concomitantly, society, were used by Scott to reveal the hidden motivations behind human interactions." On exhibition were 29 beaded sculptural works and several large fiber-and-fabric wall collages. Included were selections (partly inspired by her mother's stories and work as a nanny) from Scott's Mammy/Nanny series (1986-1991) in which she used glass beads and leather to create racial and value distinctions.

=== Believe I've Been Sanctified ===
This was Scott's first work of public art. In 1991, she was chosen along with nineteen other artists to participate in a new citywide project organized by the Spoleto Festival USA in Charleston. The exhibition was called "Places with a Past: New Site-Specific Art in Charleston" and each artist was invited to select an outdoor site and create a piece that conveyed their sense of the city's community history. Scott chose four Corinthian columns that were the last remaining remnants of the old Charleston Museum. She was told by the people at the African American historical society that "they never wanted us in there anyway" and was inspired. Using found objects and beading, Scott turned the columns into weeping willows to represent tears. Beneath them she constructed a funeral pyre from 500 logs and a figure dying, or a Phoenix, to represent "the end of slavery or the beginning of a new era, Reconstruction."

=== Images Concealed ===
In 1995, Scott responded to the Yale University for the Museum of African Art exhibition Face of the Gods: Art and Altar of Africa and African Americans with an installation titled Images Concealed at the San Francisco Art Institute. Curator Jean-Edith Weiffenbach noted that Scott, "challenged by that exhibition's revelations of the impact of African traditions on Western art, belief systems, and social customs [...] fashioned a reply that uses a contemporary hybrid of craft vocabularies from several cultures in an allegorical language that confronts stereotypes as well as issues of representation and perception."

=== Kickin' it With the Old Masters ===
Kickin' It with the Old Masters was an art exhibition held at the Baltimore Museum of Art (BMA) in January–May 2000 in collaboration with Maryland Institute College of Art (MICA). "At the entrance to the exhibition space sat Rodin's Thinker, an icon of Western art; above the statue's head Scott suspended a beaded figure hung by the neck by chains and covered with racial epithets." The juxtaposition was not to incite racial accusations but to establish an interaction with aesthetics and social constructs.

=== Harriet Tubman and Other Truths ===
Her largest exhibition to date opened October 20, 2017, and was on view through April 1, 2018 at Grounds for Sculpture. The exhibit, an homage to Harriet Tubman, the abolitionist who led many enslaved people to freedom, was ere organized with guest curator Lowery Stokes Sims for the exhibit, which was seen as a catalyst for transforming the public space created by J. Seward Johnson, the sculptor and philanthropist. This exhibition was guest curated by both Lowery Stokes Sims and Patterson Sims.

=== Walk a Mile in My Dreams ===
Opening on March 24, 2024, a retrospective of her 50-year career will feature nearly 140 pieces including a new large-scale commission by the Baltimore Museum of Art and the Seattle Art Museum. The exhibition includes sculpture, jewelry, textiles, artwear garments, performance compilations, prints, and mixed-media installations. The exhibition will be at the Baltimore Museum of Art March 24 through July 14, 2024, then at the Seattle Art Museum from October 17, 2024, through January 20, 2025.

== Public art installations ==
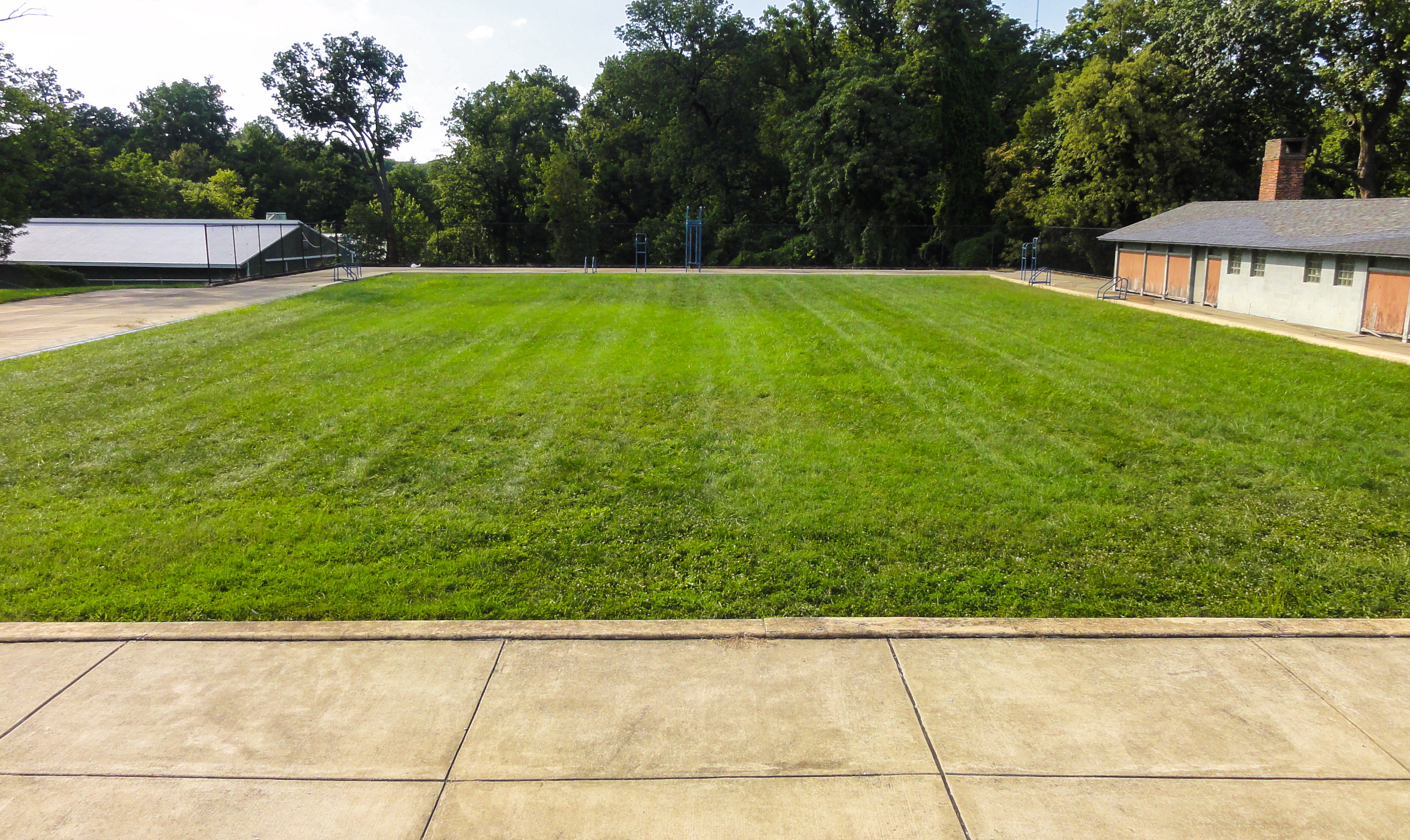
The Memorial Pool in Druid Hill Park

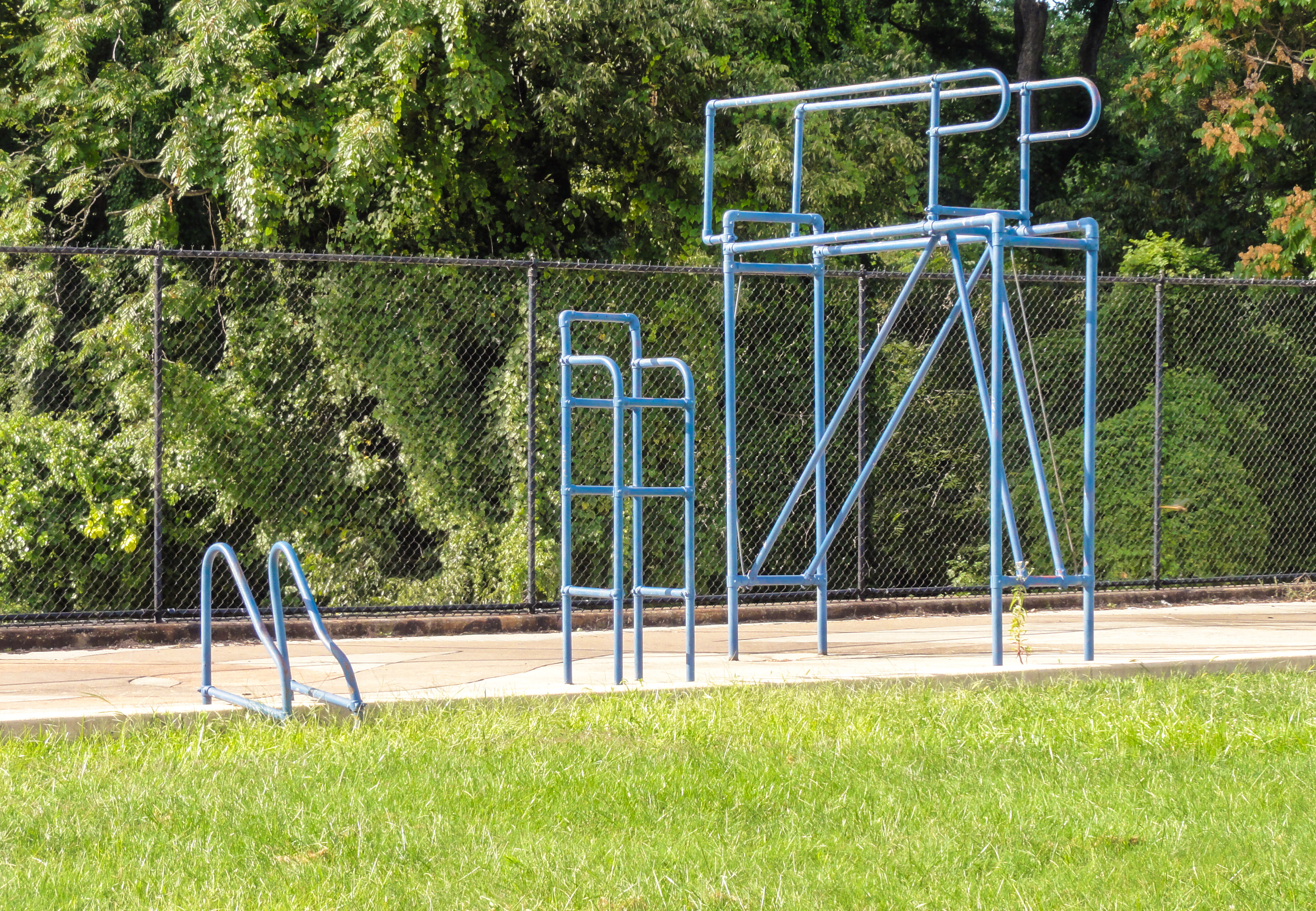
Druid Hill Park Memorial Pool diving board stand

Scott received a commission in 1996 to create a public art project commemorating Pool No. 2 in Baltimore's Druid Hill Park. Built in 1921, it served the recreational and competitive swimming needs of more than 100,000 African Americans in Baltimore. When the Baltimore City Parks Board refused to desegregate its pools despite a highly publicized drowning in a nearby river in 1953, the NAACP filed a lawsuit and eventually won on appeal. In June 1956 Baltimore pools opened as desegregated facilities for the first time. Pool No. 2 closed the next year, remaining largely abandoned until 1999 when Scott's installation transformed it.

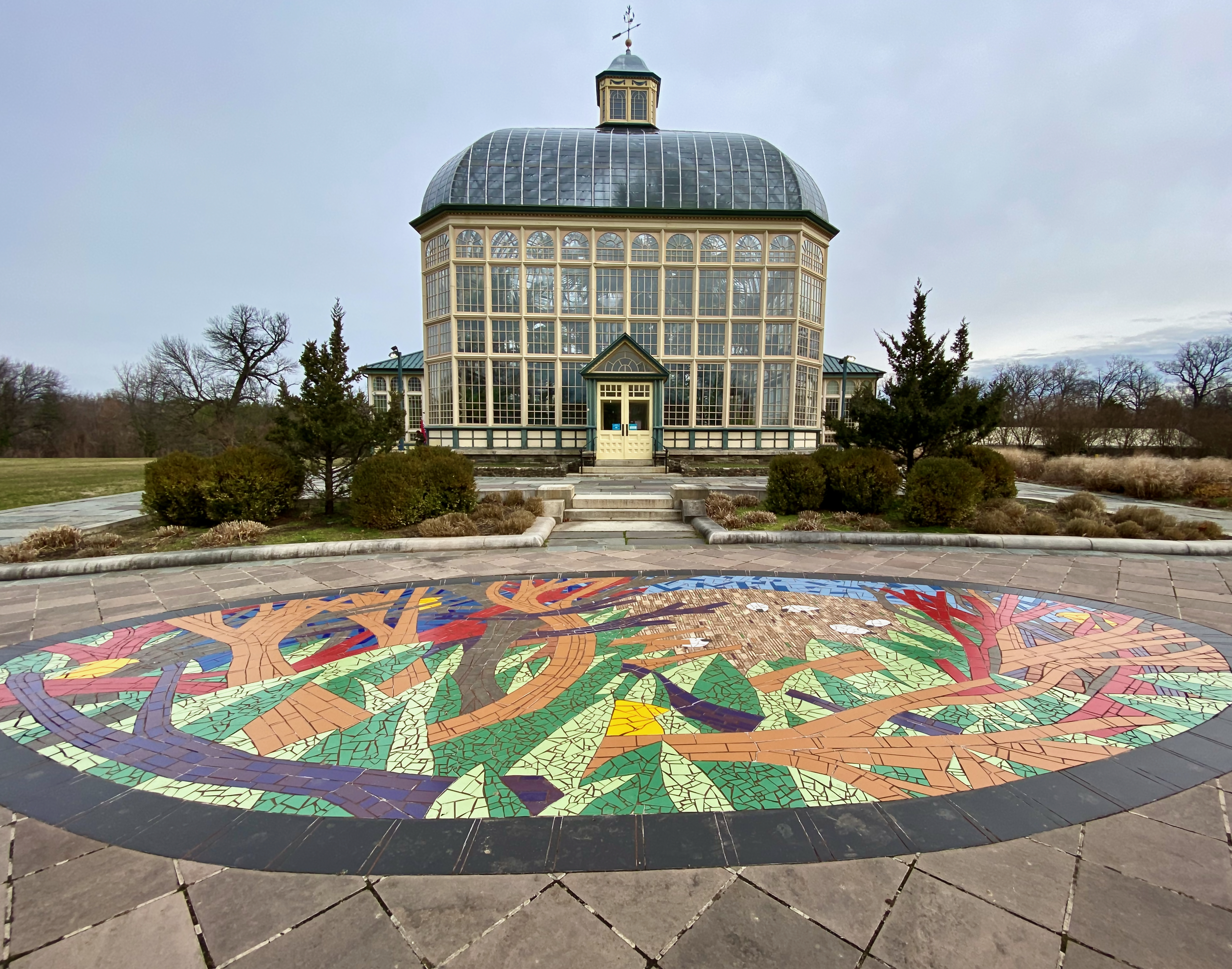
Photo of Bright Palms mosaic by Joyce J. Scott in front of the Rawlings Conservatory in Baltimore, MD

== Select honors and awards ==
Below are a few selected awards, honors and fellowships Scott has received so far in her career:

- Lifetime Achievement Award, Baltimore Museum of Art (2026)
- Gold Medalist, American Craft Council (2020)
- Smithsonian Visionary Artist (2019)
- MacArthur Fellow, John D. and Catherine T. MacArthur Foundation, Chicago, IL (2016)
- Masters of the Medium, James Renwick Alliance, Smithsonian American Art Museum, Smithsonian Institution, Washington, DC (2006)
- Governor's Arts Award at Artsalute: Maryland Citizens for the Arts Foundation, Walters Art Museum, Baltimore, MD (2002)
- Fellow, American Craft Council, New York, NY (2001)
- Anonymous Was a Woman (1997)
- National Living Treasure Award, Maryland Nominee (1996)
- Mid Atlantic Arts Foundation Award (1994)
- Pace Roberts Fellowship (1994)
- National Printing Fellowship (1992)
- Mid Atlantic Consortium Award (1990)
- Maryland State Arts Council Fellowship (1987, 1981)
- Fellowship, National Endowment of the Arts (1980)

== Museum collections ==
Scott's works are held by the Baltimore Museum of Art, the Corning Museum of Glass, the Detroit Institute of Arts, Johns Hopkins University Permanent Collection, Mildred Lane Kemper Art Museum in St. Louis, Missouri, the Mint Museum of Art in Charlotte, North Carolina, the Museum of Fine Arts, Houston, Texas, the Philadelphia Museum of Art, Philadelphia, Pennsylvania Philbrook Museum of Art, Tulsa, OK Rhode Island School of Design Museum, Providence, RI, the Spencer Museum of Art at the University of Kansas, the Smithsonian American Art Museum, the Weatherspoon Art Museum, Greensboro, NC, and Yale University, New Haven, CT.

Her works Yellow #4 and Birth of Mammy #4 were acquired by the Smithsonian American Art Museum as part of the Renwick Gallery's 50th Anniversary Campaign.
