= Bead weaving =

Beadwork technique

Bead weaving (or beadweaving) is a set of techniques for weaving sheets and objects of seed beads. Threads are strung through and/or around the beads to hold them together. It can be done either on a loom or using one of a number of off-loom stitches.

== On-loom beadweaving ==
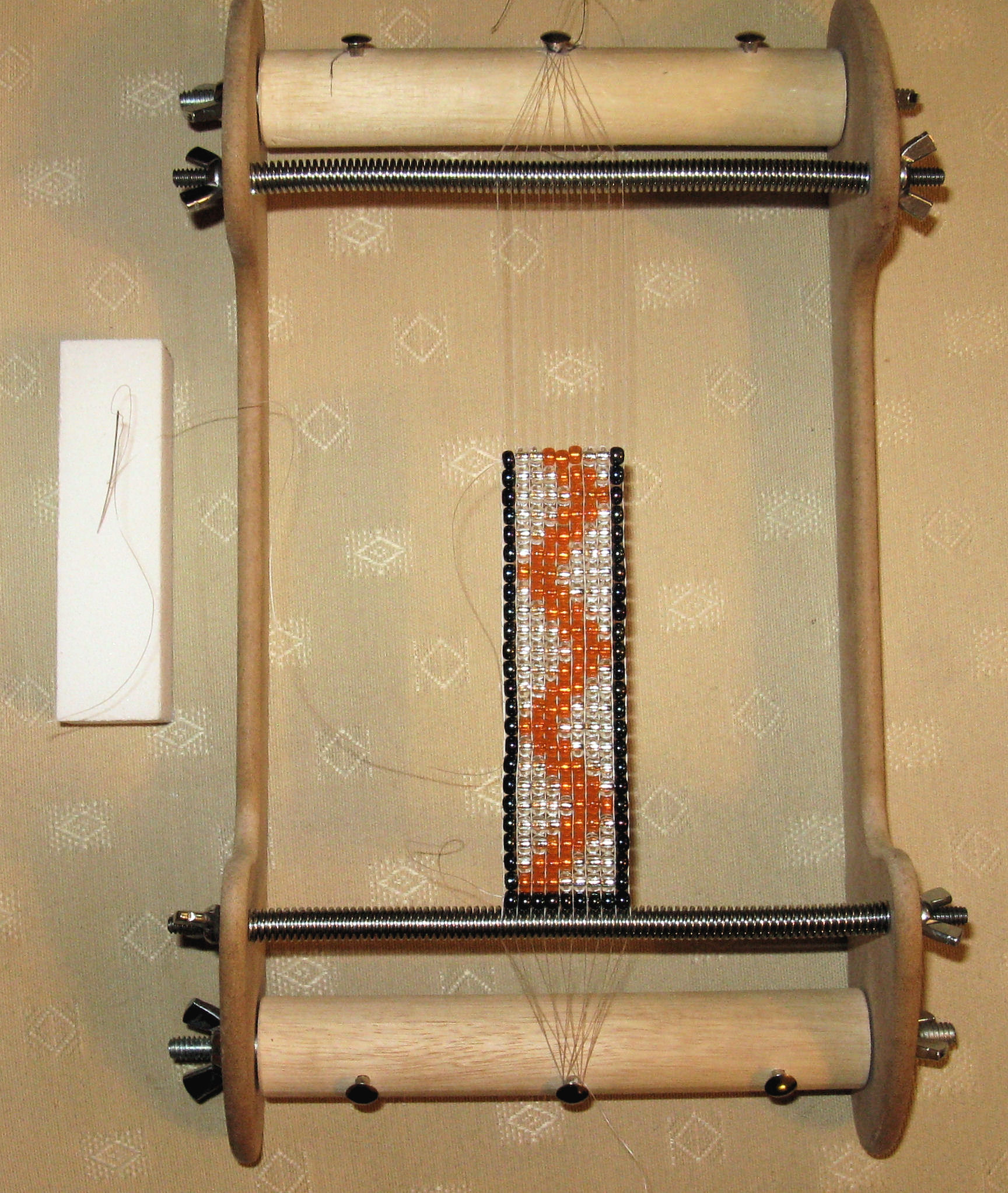
A bracelet in progress on a bead-weaving loom

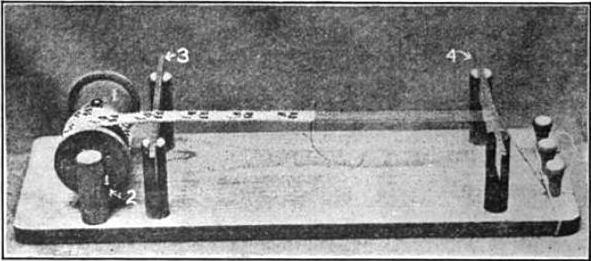
A 1903 Apache bead loom. 1. Roller. 2. Roller end. 3. Spacers. 4. Spacers.

When weaving on a loom, the beads are strung on the weft threads and locked in between the warp threads. Although loomed pieces are typically rectangular, it is possible to increase and decrease to produce angular or curvy shapes. Fringe can also be added during weaving or before the piece is removed from the loom.

=== Frame looms ===
The most common modern loom bead weaving technique requires two passes of the weft thread per row of beads. First, an entire row of beads is strung on the weft thread. Then the beads are pressed in between the warp threads from below. Then the needle is passed back through the beads, but above the warp threads, to lock the beads into place.

Bead looms vary in size and are typically made of wood or metal. Usually, a comb or spring is used to hold the warp threads a bead-width apart (the lede image shows a threaded rod). Some looms have roller bars; these allow the weaver to produce pieces that are longer than the loom. Most looms are meant to sit on a table, but some have floor stands or are meant to sit in the lap. Cheap bead looms are sometimes made from styrofoam trays, wrapping the warp through evenly-spaced small slits notched into opposite edges.

=== Heddle looms ===
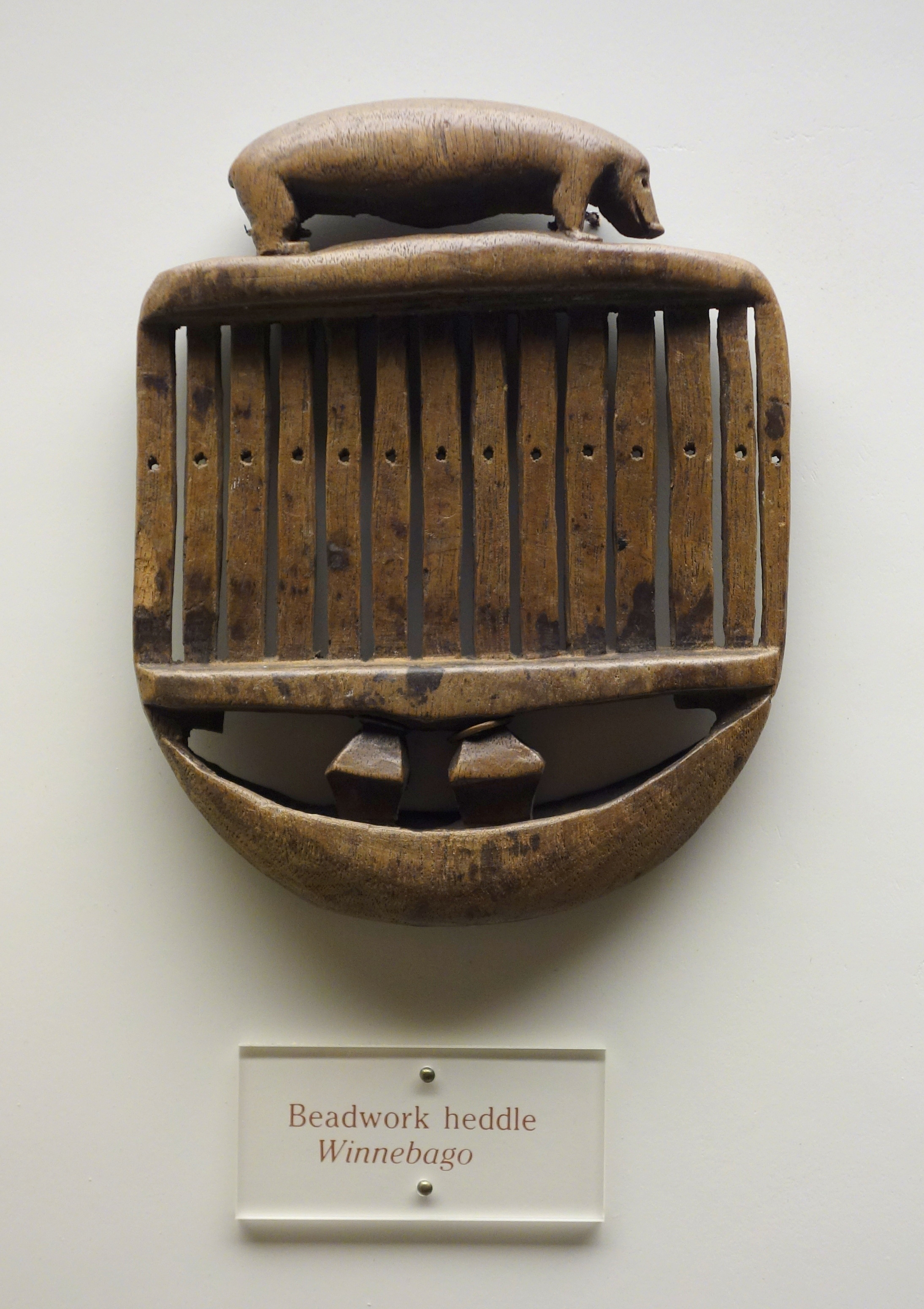
Undated rigid heddle for beadwork, Ho-chunk, Wisconsin.

Heddle bead looms were popular in the United States near the beginning of the 20th century. They allow weaving of beads by raising every other thread and inserting strung beads in the shed, the space between the lowered and raised threads. There are still a few heddle bead looms being manufactured today. The most difficult part of loomwork is finishing off the warp threads.

== Off-loom beadweaving ==
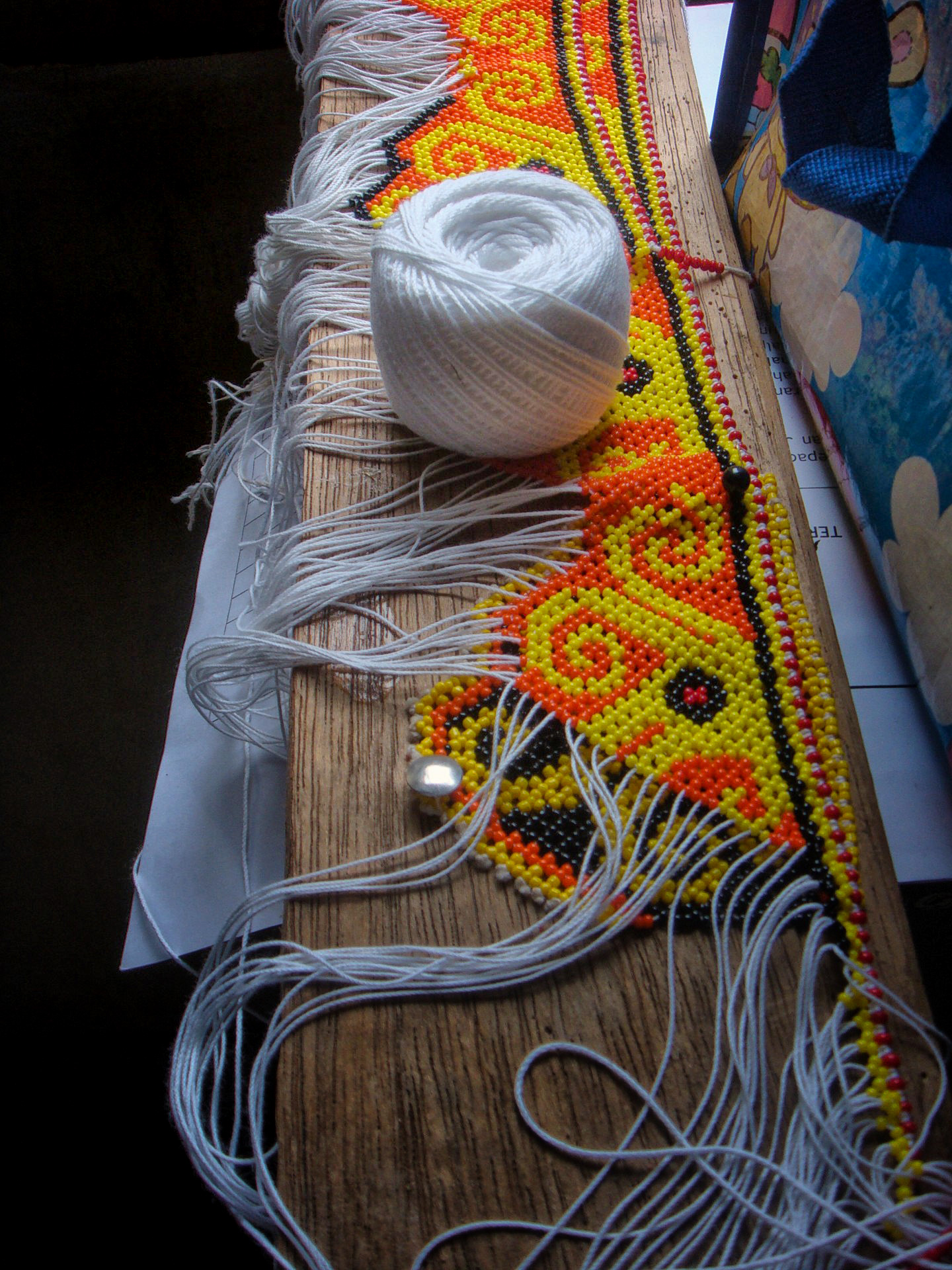
An example of off-loom beadweaving, specifically plaiting, from Sarawak, Malaysia.

Off-loom beadweaving is a family of beadwork techniques in which seed beads are woven together into a flat fabric, a tubular rope, or a three-dimensional object such as a ball, clasp, box, or a piece of jewelry. Most off-loom techniques can be accomplished using a single needle and thread (no warp threads), and some have two-needle variations. Different stitches produce pieces with distinct textures, shapes, and patterns. There are many different off-loom bead stitches, including new stitches (distinct thread paths) published as recently as 2015:

- albion stitch, developed by Heather Kingsley-Heath, published May 2009
- brick stitch, also known as Comanche or Cheyenne stitch
- chevron stitch, a triangular form of bead netting
- diamond weave, developed over a number of years by Gerlinde Lenz, published August 2015
- herringbone stitch, also known as Ndebele stitch
- hubble stitch and wave hubble stitch, created and developed by Melanie de Miguel, published 2015
- netting, to avoid confusion specifically bead netting
- peyote stitch, also known as gourd stitch
- plaiting, crossing multiple threads as in a plait or braid, using beads to connect the crossings
- pondo stitch, also known as African circle stitch
- right-angle weave
- Saint Petersburg chain
- square stitch, an off loom stitch that mimics the look of loomed bead projects.
- ladder stitch, a foundation stitch that is used to build a base for brick stitch or herringbone stitch.
- triangle weave

Spiral Bead Weaving Stitches

- Cellini spiral, a tubular peyote stitch
- Dutch spiral
- African helix
- Russian spiral
- Chenille

== See also ==
- Glass beadmaking
- Beadwork
- Bead embroidery
- Bead knitting
- Bead crochet
- Quillwork
