= Elizabeth Talford Scott =

American artist (1916–2011)

- Born: February 8, 1916 near Chester, South Carolina, U.S.
- Died: April 25, 2011 (aged 95); Baltimore, Maryland, U.S.
- Style: Quilting
- Children: Joyce J. Scott
- Awards: Women's Caucus for Art Lifetime Achievement Award (1987)
- Website: elizabethtalfordscott.com

Elizabeth Talford Scott (February 8, 1916 – April 25, 2011) was an American artist, known for her quilts.

== Early life ==
Elizabeth Caldwell was born near Chester, South Carolina, where her family lived as sharecroppers on the Blackstock Plantation, on the land where her grandparents had been enslaved. She was the sixth of fourteen children (seven brothers and seven sisters) born to Mary Jane and Samuel Caldwell and the third female. Talford Scott grew up in a family of craftspeople who practiced pottery, metalwork, basketry, quilting and knitting. They were also storytellers. Both her parents made quilts, and Talford Scott learned to quilt by the age of 9. Her father was a railroad worker who collected fabric scraps in his travels, and he colored the scraps using natural dyes that he made from berries and clay. In 1940, during the Great Migration, Talford Scott moved north to Baltimore, Maryland, to seek greater economic opportunities.

== Career ==
In Baltimore, Elizabeth Talford Scott toiled long hours as a domestic worker, a hired caregiver for other people's children, and a cook, and stopped quilting from around 1940-1970. Upon her retirement, Talford Scott took up quilting again and soon developed her unique style that expanded upon the traditional strip piecing she had learned from her family. In addition to piecework, these new quilts often incorporated embroidery, appliqué, beadwork, sequins, plastic netting, and found objects such as stones, buttons, and shells. Her quilts evolved into dense compositions, often abstract and asymmetrical, with references to family rituals, personal stories, and the rural environment of her childhood. Talford Scott regularly presented workshops and demonstrations and frequently collaborated with her daughter, the artist Dr. Joyce J. Scott, to educate students about her craft. The quilts of Elizabeth Talford Scott were exhibited at the Pennsylvania Academy of Fine Arts, the Walters Art Museum, the Baltimore Museum of Art, and in New York at the Museum of Biblical Art, the Studio Museum of Harlem, the Museum of American Folk Art, and the Metropolitan Museum of Art.

In 1987, Talford Scott received the Women's Caucus for Art Lifetime Achievement Award. In 1990, Talford Scott and her daughter were featured in the film The Silver Needle: The Legacy of Elizabeth and Joyce Scott. In 1998, the Maryland Institute College of Art held a retrospective of Talford Scott's work, Eyewinkers, Tumbleturds and Candlebugs: The Art of Elizabeth Talford Scott, which was curated by George Ciscle. That exhibition traveled to the Smithsonian's Anacostia Community Museum, the Southeastern Center for Contemporary Art, and the New England Quilt Museum.

The work of Elizabeth Talford Scott can be found in several private and museum collections including the Baltimore Museum of Art, the Delaware Art Museum, the Philbrook Museum of Art, and the Museum of Fine Arts, Boston. Since 2019, the Estate of Elizabeth Talford Scott has been managed by Goya Contemporary in Baltimore, MD, under the direction of Amy Eva Raehse. Goya Contemporary has since mounted numerous shows of Talford Scott's works including "Both Sides Now: The Spirituality, Resilience, and Innovation of Elizabeth Talford Scott" (2023), and The Armory Show in 2021, noted as one of the top-ten booths by The New York Times.

In 2023, the curator of the Eyewinkers, Tumbleturds, and Candlebugs: The Art of Elizabeth Talford Scott (1998), George Ciscle, curated a retrospective exhibition by the same name at the Baltimore Museum of Art to mark the twenty-five-year anniversary of the exhibition. This exhibition is one of nine within No Stone Left Unturned: The Elizabeth Talford Scott Initiative across Baltimore City. No Stone Left Unturned; The Elizabeth Talford Scott Initiative is a collaboration between the Baltimore Museum of Art, Coppin State University, the James E. Lewis Museum for Art at Morgan State University, Johns Hopkins University, Maryland Center for History and Culture, Maryland Institute College of Art, The Peale, Reginald F. Lewis Museum, the Walters Art Museum, and the Estate of Elizabeth Talford Scott at Goya Contemporary Gallery Under the guidance of 2023-24 Exhibition Development Seminar instructor, Deyane Moses, students from the four participating universities have developed curatorial directions for their respective exhibitions to be opened in February 2024.

== Personal life and legacy ==
In 1940 upon moving to Baltimore, Elizabeth Caldwell met Charlie Scott, Jr., from Durham, NC. They had one daughter, artist Joyce J. Scott (b. 1948). When Joyce was twelve, Elizabeth and Charlie separated. Charlie Scott, Jr., died in 2005. Talford Scott and her daughter continued to live together in Baltimore until Talford Scott's death in 2011 at age 95.
