= Ran Hwang =

Ran Hwang is a sculptural artist primarily known for her mixed-media work with buttons, beads, pins, and thread. Born in Pusan, South Korea, in 1960 Hwang works and resides in New York and Seoul. She has exhibited internationally in Switzerland, France, Korea, Dubai, Singapore, and numerous other cities. Her work resides in the collections of museums such as the Brooklyn Museum, the Des Moines Art Center, The National Museum of Contemporary Art in Seoul, and the King County Library. Her work will also be featured in the Brooklyn Museum show, "Diverse Works: Director's Choice 1997-2015".

== Education and awards ==
Born in Pusan, she received her MFA from the School of Arts in Chung-Ang University in 1997. She received her BFA from the School of Visual Arts in 2000. Shortly after graduation, she worked in an embroidery design studio. In 2014, she was selected for a residency at the Massachusetts Museum of Contemporary Art. Hwang has received a Gold Prize from the AHL Foundation, a Gold Prize from the Korean Watercolor Subscription Exhibition, as well as being the recipient of several fellowships, including the PS122 Studio Residency Program, the AAI-Artist Alliance, and the Vermont Studio Center Residency Program.

=== Work ===
Hwang was originally trained as a realist painter, but began using her signature buttons in the aftermath of the events of 9 / 11. As Barbara Pollack writes, Hwang's technique elevates the mundane object, both in recycling and in reference to the 'labor force of the international garment industry...performed by millions of women, many in Asian countries.' Her initial use of buttons, pins and thread came from an early job at a NYC embroidery firm. The construction of her sculptures is laborious, as the artist hammers thousands of nails into the wall in order to create a complex work. Her motifs often explore classical Asian subjects, such as trees, temples, birds, flowers, and Buddhas. She describes her process as meditative, through which the repetition of the hammering evokes a Zen-like discipline.

Although her work often references classical Asian motifs, Ran Hwang reinterprets these images through her medium, redefining her cultural heritage. While the array of pins and buttons appear cohesive from a distance, the impermanence of their construction and fragile structure contradict that illusion. As an immigrant artist, Ran Hwang's work appears as a transformation of her cultural background, while also featuring American icons, such as Marilyn Monroe. Her assemblage technique retains a performative element, as the act of disassembling the work also reminds the viewer of the cyclical nature of growth and beauty. Her video work echoes the same themes. In Garden of Water (2010), a tableau of spiders and chandeliers is projected onto plexiglass. They assemble rapidly, only to be washed away and return again, echoing themes of excess and futility within her work.
