= Square stitch =

Square stitch is an off-loom bead weaving stitch that mimics the appearance of beadwork created on a loom. Loom patterns and even cross stitch embroidery patterns may be used for square stitch pieces. Because each bead in a square stitch piece is connected by thread to each of the four beads surrounding it, this stitch is very strong.

== How to ==
1. Cut thread about arms length and thread the needle
2. Thread one bead and hold it on the thread about 6 inches from the end
3. Thread your needle the same direction the thread is currently going through the bead. this creates a stop bead; the rest of the work will not fall off. The bead should be stuck on the thread 6 inches from the end.
4. String a number of beads; can be an odd or even number
5. To start the next row, string one more bead. thread your needle back through the last bead of the first row, the thread is now coming out the end of the first row. thread your needle through the bead just added for the next row. The bead should be stacked right above the first row.
6. String one more bead and thread the needle through the bead on the previous row that the new bead should sit on top of.
7. Thread the needle back through the bead that is being added.
8. Continue this to the end of the row
9. Once the final bead is added to the second row, thread the needle through all of the first row beads and then the second row beads
10. Turn your work and repeat steps 5–8.
11. Everytime the end of the row is reached, repeat step 9.
12. Once the final row is reached, thread the rest of the string throughout the piece and cut off the extra, if any.

== See also ==
- Peyote stitch
- Brick stitch
