= Brick stitch =

Off-loom bead weaving technique

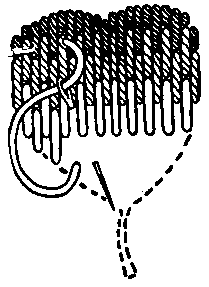
- Type: Bead weaving stitch
- Place of origin: American, Africa, the Middle East, and South America.

Brick stitch, also known as the Cheyenne stitch or Comanche stitch, is a bead weaving stitch in which individual beads are stacked horizontally in the same pattern as bricks are stacked in a wall.

== Description and usage ==
The technique has been used by Native Americans and in Africa, the Middle East and South America. Guatemalan examples use beads of size 22/0 and smaller.

This is an off-loom technique perfected by Native Americans. It is a relative of another off-loom technique called peyote stitch or gourd stitch. A brick stitch pattern can be worked as a peyote stitch pattern if turned through 90 degrees.

Brick stitch is different from other stitches in bead weaving as the beads are attached to the thread in between the beads, not to the last bead added, as in other stitches, or to beads in the previous rows.

== Variations ==
There are many variations of brick stitch in bead weaving. These include flat brick stitch, circular brick stitch or tubular brick stitch. A popular use of brick stitch is to bead around a component, be it a closed jump ring or another larger bead.

It is easy to increase and decrease in brick stitch by skipping a thread bridge or forcing two beads into one thread bridge, making it a versatile stitch to shape bead work with.

== See also ==
- Quillwork
- Peyote stitch
- Square stitch
