= Herringbone stitch =

Stitch used in garment construction and embroidery

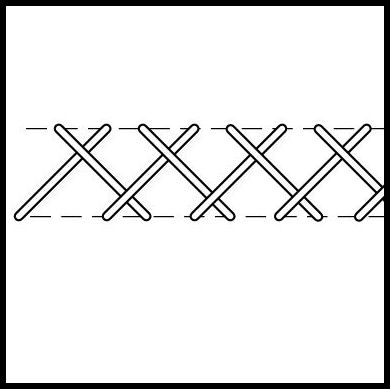
Embroidered herringbone stitch.

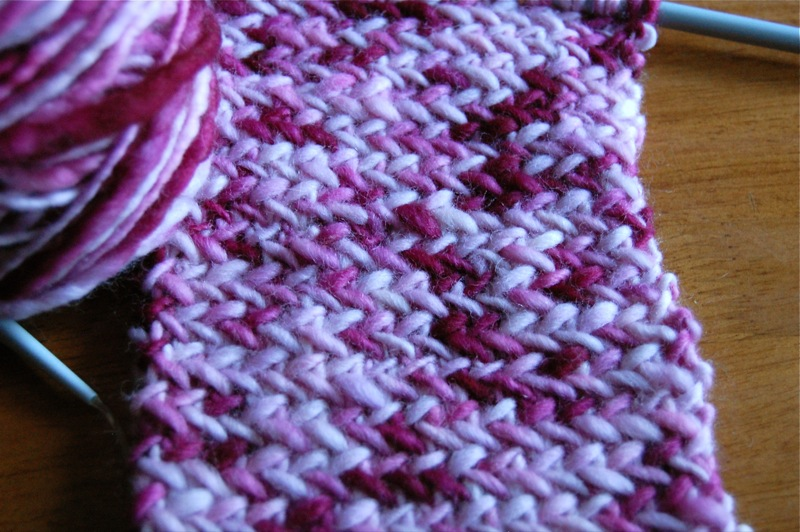
A knitted herringbone stitch.

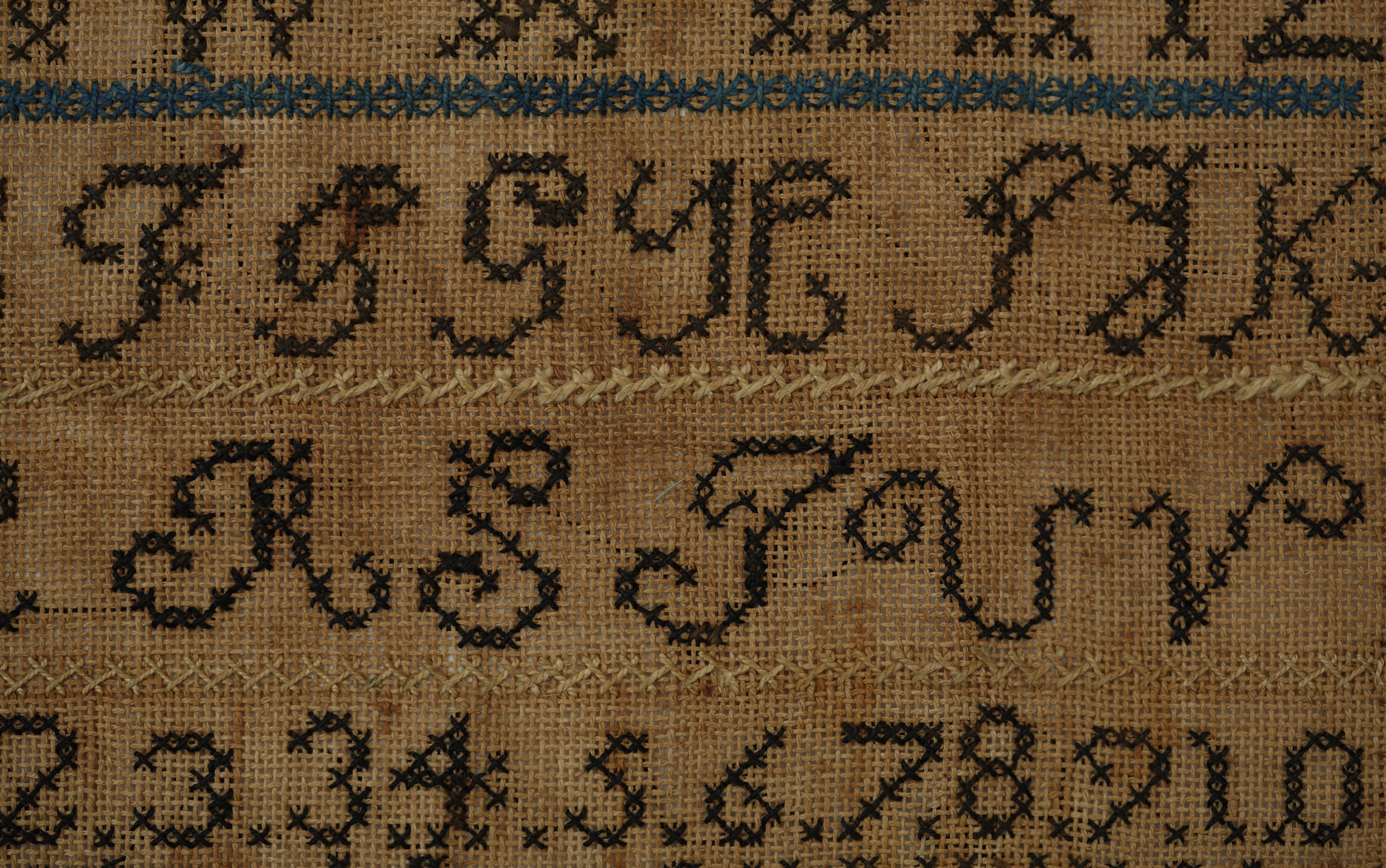
Embroidery sampler featuring herringbone stitch

A herringbone stitch is a needlework stitch used in embroidery, knitting and crochet. It is so named as it resembles the bones extending from the spine of a herring fish. In knitting, it is a stitch that creates a fabric pattern closely resembling a herringbone pattern, or herringbone cloth.

A knitted herringbone stitch creates a firm fabric "similar to a woven in appearance and elasticity". A heavyweight fabric can be made with variations of the herringbone stitch, such as the herringbone twist stitch, which can be worked in either one or two colours; both versions are suitable for experienced knitters.

== Cultural symbolism ==
The herringbone stitch is used as one of the symbolic motifs in the traditional knitted Aran jumper, or "fisherman's sweater"; specifically, the tradition as it exists in the Channel Islands of Guernsey, Jersey and Filey. The herringbone pattern represents the "fisherman's catch and thus for success in one's career".

== See also ==
- Basic knitted fabrics
- List of knitting stitches
