= Bead crochet =

Crochet technique

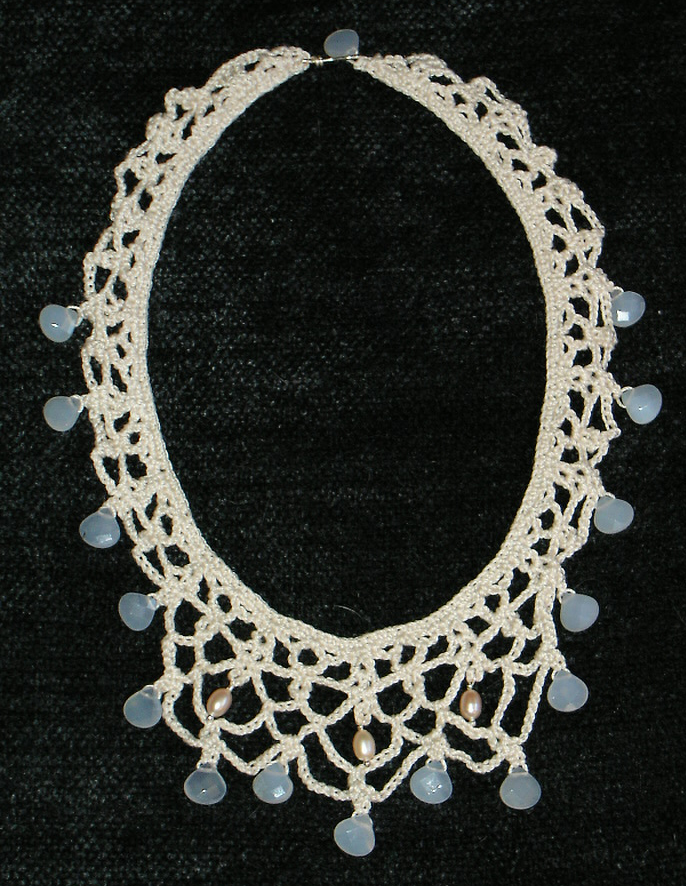
A bead crochet necklace made from mercerized cotton, faceted chalcedony, and freshwater pearls. Two different attachment methods were used: the chalcedony beads were strung before construction and moved into position during crocheting; the pearls were attached by means of silver pins afterward. A chalcedony bead forms part of the clasp.

Bead crochet is a crochet technique that incorporates beads into a crochet fabric. The technique is used to produce decorative effects in women's fashion accessories. The word "crochet" is derived from the French croche or croc meaning "to hook". Published descriptions of bead crochet date from around 1824, although it was probably common before then. At one time, bead crochet was thought by some people to be appropriate only for rich people.

Early examples of bead crochet include nineteenth century miser's purses. By the 1920s bead crochet technique also made necklace ropes, bracelets, and beaded bags. Bead crochet waned during the 1930s when the Great Depression reduced free time for decorative needlework and as inexpensive manufactured goods became more readily available. Interest in bead crochet has revived somewhat in recent years as a hobbyist pastime.

== Construction ==
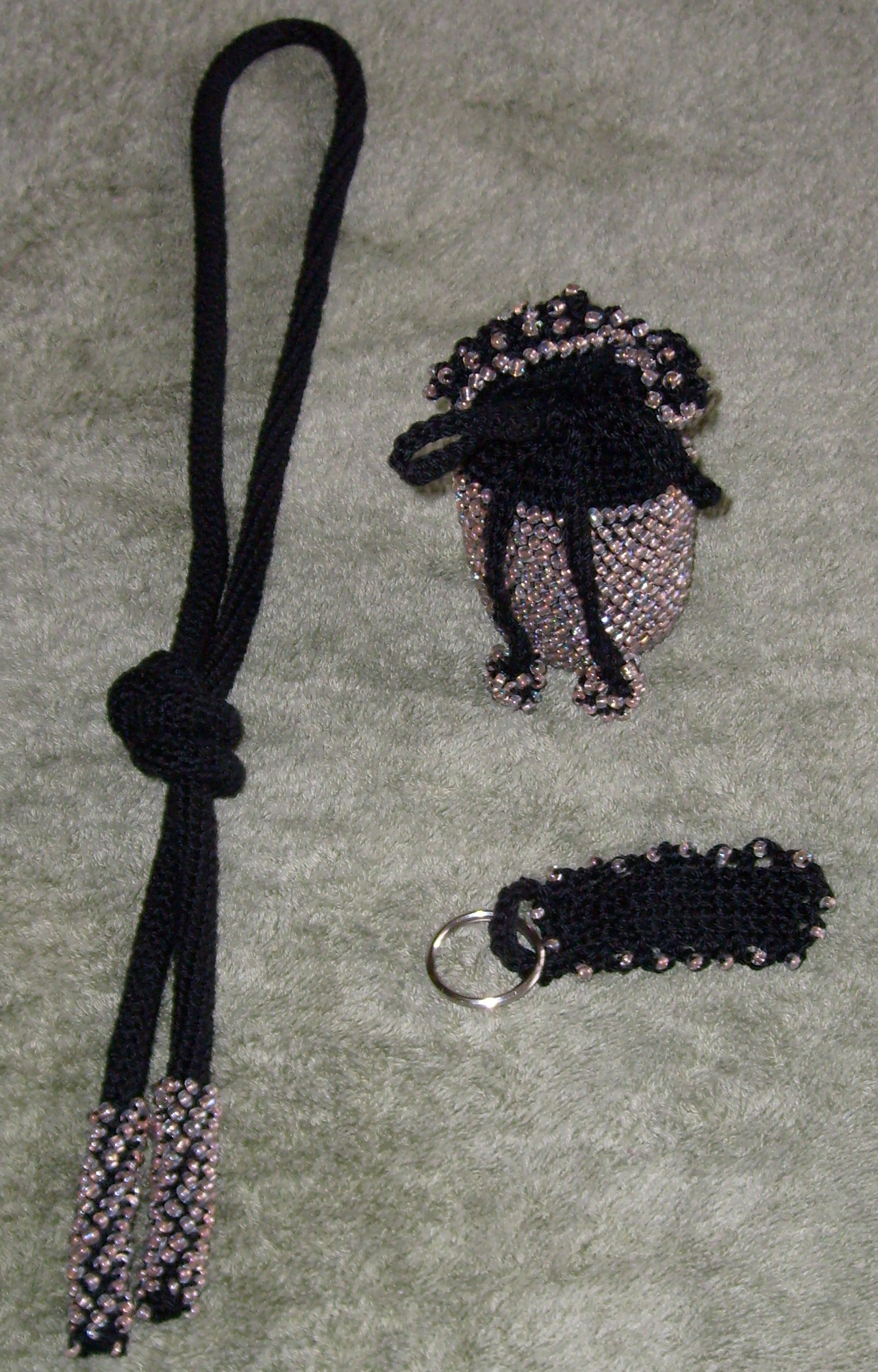
Convertible necklace/belt, drawstring change purse, and keychain

Most bead crochet is created by stringing beads onto uncut crochet thread prior to crocheting. Most artists either use a beading needle or apply clear nail polish to the end of the thread to create an anchor point for beading. At predetermined stitches, the crocheter slides one bead down and incorporates it into the fabric. Pre-stringing requires both the bead sequence and the crochet pattern to be fully planned in advance of manufacture. This technique aligns beads on one side of the stitch. So crocheting in rounds naturally yields a bead side and a crochet side. Projects that are worked in rows would either have beads on both sides of the fabric or have alternating bead and non-bead rows.

Off-loom stitches and fringing may also be used to add beads onto finished crochet work. Design considerations in bead crochet include the size of the yarn or weight to be used, the diameter of the beads, and the weight of the bead material.
