= Seed bead =

Small bead used for weaving and embellishments

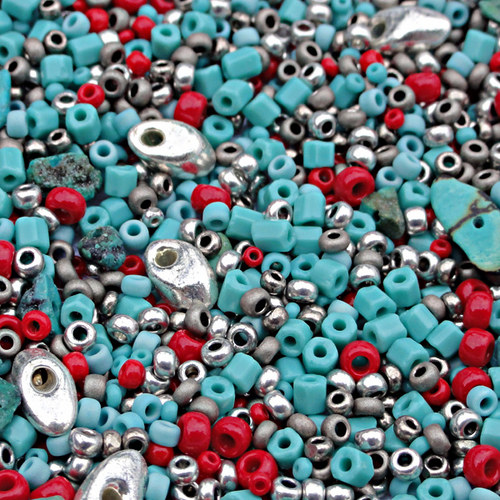
A collection of small beads

Seed beads or rocailles are uniformly shaped, spheroidal beads ranging in size from under a millimeter to several millimeters. Seed bead is also a generic term for any small bead. Usually rounded in shape, seed beads are most commonly used for loom and off-loom bead weaving. They may be used for simple stringing, or as spacers between other beads in jewelry.

Larger seed beads are used in various fiber crafts for embellishment, or crochet with fiber or soft, flexible wire. The largest size of a seed bead is 1/0 ("one-aught", sometimes written 1/°) and the smallest is 24/0, about the size of a grain of sand. Seed beads are categorized by size, with larger beads (e.g., 1/0 to 4/0) used in fiber arts, and smaller beads (e.g., 11/0 to 15/0) common in intricate weaving. Industry standards vary by manufacturer. Modern seed bead sizes commonly used in beadwork range from 6/0 to 15/0, with 6/0, 8/0 and 11/0 being particularly prevalent in beaded knitting techniques. The extremely small class of seed beads smaller than 15/0 have not been in production since the 1890s and any in existence are usually considered antiques.

The narrow diameter of seed bead holes necessitates the use of specially designed beading needles, which are longer and thinner than standard sewing needles and is called a beading needle.

== Construction techniques ==
Two principal techniques are used to produce seed beads: the wound method and the drawn method. The wound method is the more-traditional technique, is more time-consuming, and is no longer used in modern bead production: in this technique, a chunk of glass known in glassmaking as a gather and composed mainly of silica is heated on an iron bar until molten. A second bar of iron is then inserted into the gather and the two bars quickly drawn apart creating a long glass rod (the final width of which would depend on how quickly and how far the bars are separated before the glass solidifies). This rod is then cut into shorter rods for handling. Next, one of these is re-heated and wound around a hot metal wire creating a ring of glass which is then worked and shaped until smooth and round. This is done several times on the same wire creating a series of glass rings. Once the wire cools, the rings are slipped off and then used as beads. For the drawn method, an air bubble is created within the gather and as the iron bars are drawn apart they produce a long tube rather than a rod. This tube is then cooled, cut into rings, and the rings are tumbled to remove sharp edges before being used as beads.

== Varieties ==
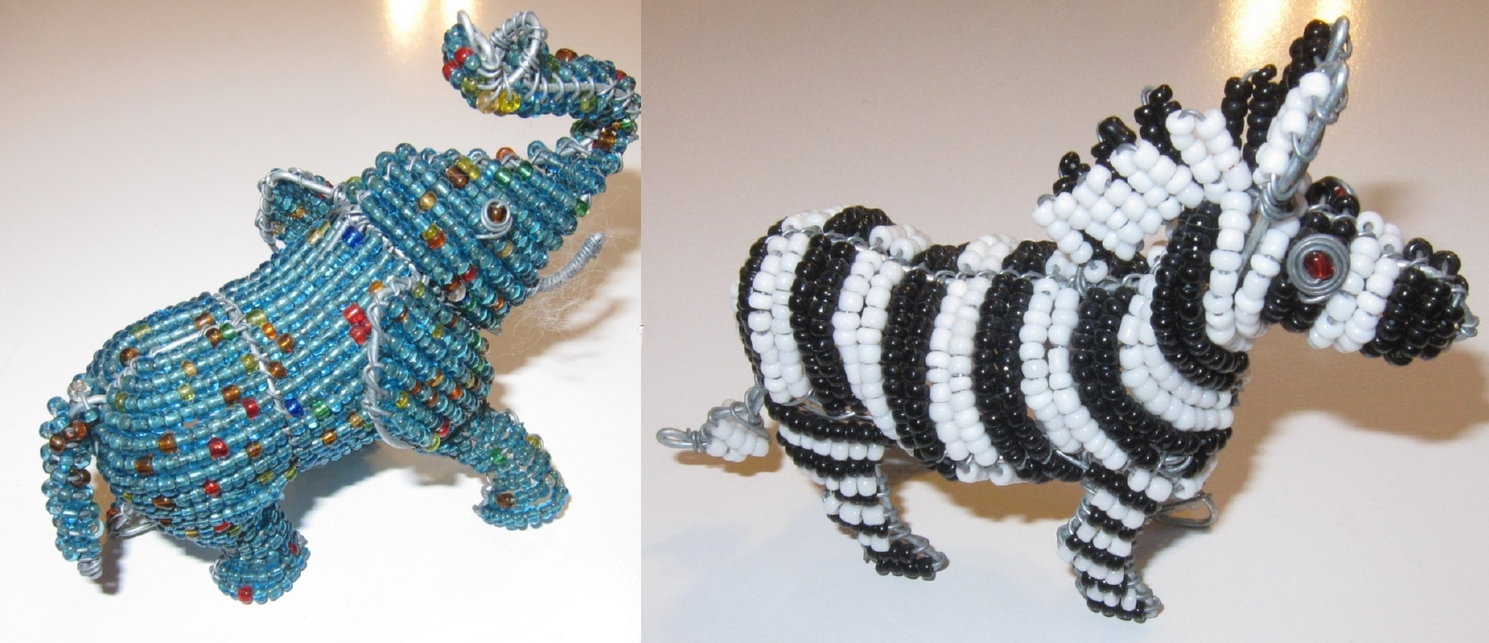
Elephant and zebra in seed beads

=== National origin ===
Before World War II, there was a thriving bead industry centered in eastern Europe, especially in Bohemia, before 1918 a part of the Austro-Hungarian empire and a part of the Republic of Czechoslovakia after, although Germany, Italy and France were also noted producers of glass beads. Most of these beads were made of glass, but some were made of metal, usually aluminum or steel, and often cut in what is known as "three-cut" faceting; these are popularly known as steel cuts. Many of the old factories were converted or destroyed during World War II. After the fall of the Iron Curtain, treasure troves of old beads made their way to Western markets. These "vintage" beads are highly prized, and are now harder to find.

Most contemporary high-quality seed beads are made in Japan, India, or the Czech Republic. Japanese seed beads are generally more uniform in size, shape, and finish as well as having larger holes than Czech seed beads of the same size, but the Japanese make fewer styles.

Some seed beads produced in France are available in historic "old-time" colors and are popular for use in repairing or replicating antiquities.

Lesser quality seed beads are produced in India, in People's Republic of China (PRC) and in Taiwan. Beads from these countries are less uniform in shape, hole size and finish. Dyed seed beads may transfer the dye to clothing or skin. Other seed beads have an external coating that will rub away to reveal a completely different color underneath.

Generally, less expensive beads are more susceptible to the ravages of time no matter their country of origin.

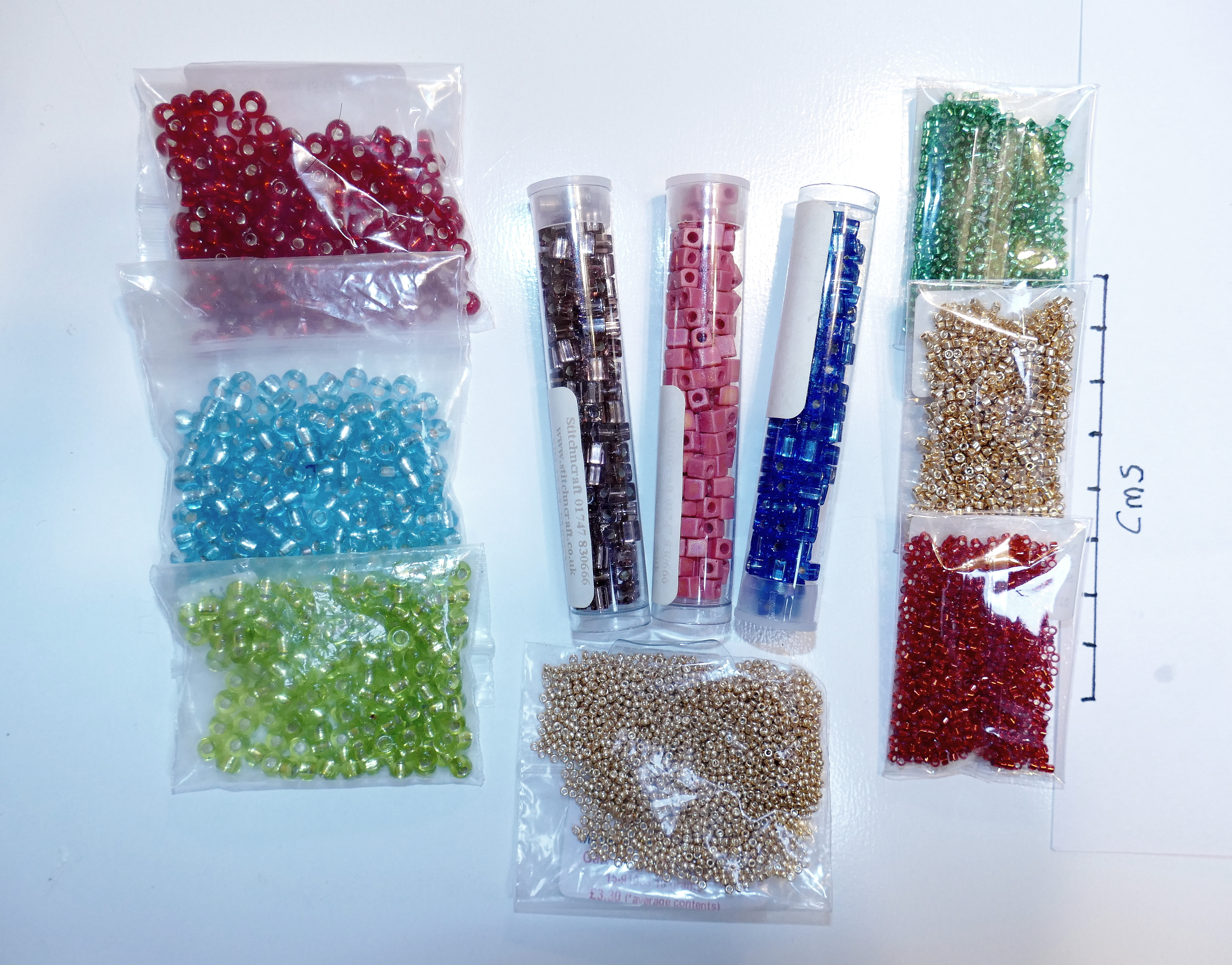
A selection of glass seed beads. The tiny beads in the packet at bottom centre are size 15. On the right are three packets of Delica beads size 11.

=== Colors and finishes ===
- Color lined - a color coating is applied inside the beads; sometimes this is not very durable and the color of finished work may appear very different in a short time
- Transparent - the glass is see-through
- Translucent - one can see light through the bead, although the light is diffused
- Opaque - the solid color prevents light from passing through the bead
- Matte - the bead is textured on a microscopic level to result in a matte finish
- Silver-lined - a silvery coating which reflects light is applied to the inside of the seed bead
- Copper-lined - a coppery coating which reflects a reddish light is applied to the inside of the seed bead
- Bronze-lined - a bronzy coating which reflects a brown light is applied to the inside of the seed bead
- Luster or lustre - a transparent "pearl" effect applied to the surface of the seed bead
- AB or aurora borealis - a rainbow effect applied to the surface of a seed bead

Formulas for different colors of glass are closely guarded. The recipe for a true black glass was lost during World War I, and modern black glass held to sunlight is a deep purple. Examples of true black glass are circulating in jewelry pieces made to commemorate the funeral of Queen Victoria.

Glass rods made with concentric layers of color or stripes of color can be used to make patterns of color in seed beads.

Seed bead machinery uses glass rods softened to a red heat, fed into a steel die stamp that forms the shape of the bead with a reciprocating needle that forms the hole. Manual and automatic machinery is in use in the Czech Republic. As the steel dies wear eventually, they are replaced.

=== Cylinder beads ===
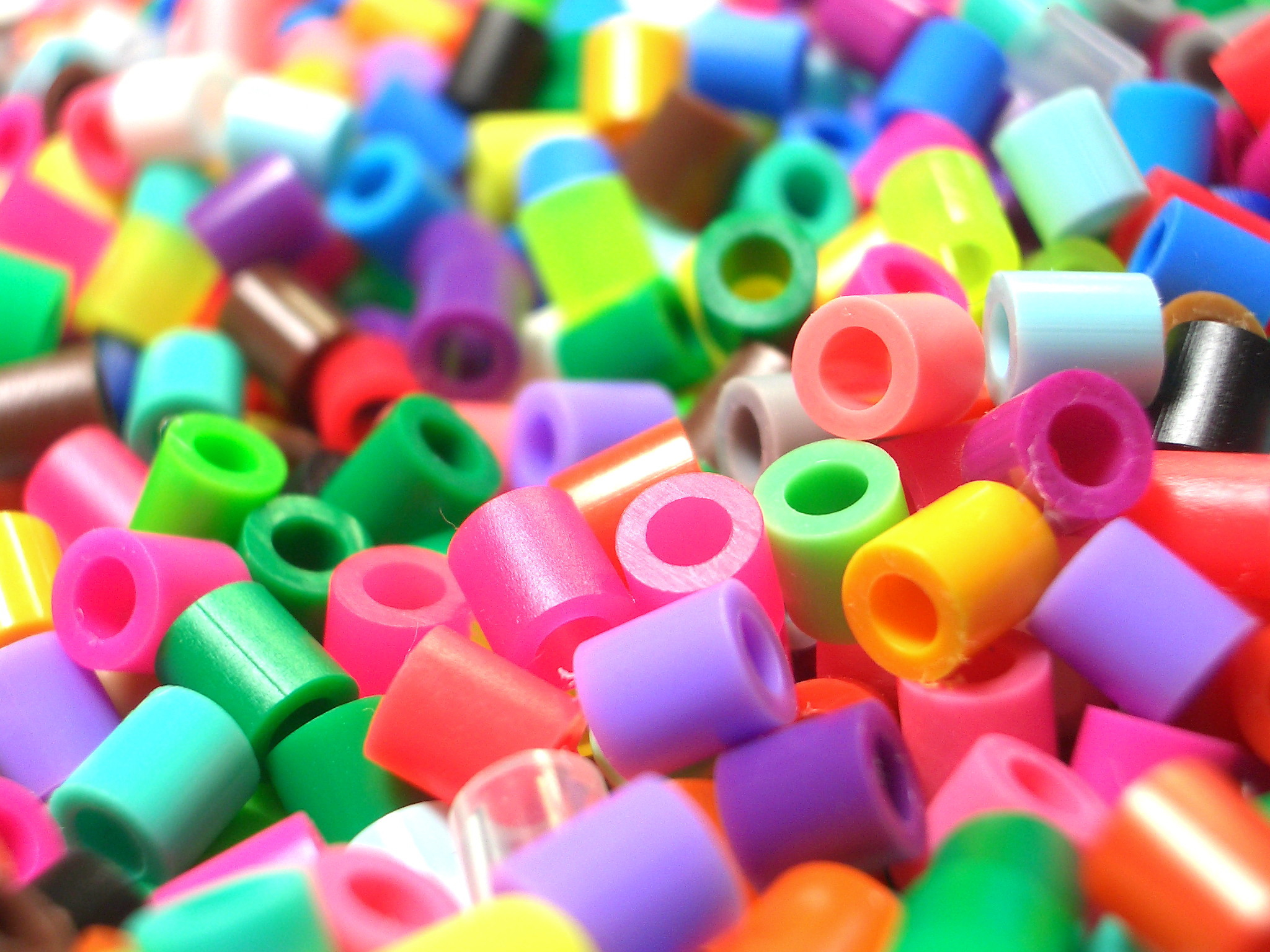
Plastic cylinder beads

During the last few decades, a new shape of Japanese seed bead, the cylinder bead, has become increasingly popular. They were invented by Masayoshi Katsuoka of the Miyuki Shoji Company in the 1980s. Unlike the more rounded donut-shaped rocaille seed beads, cylinder beads have large holes for their size, and their diameters, inside and out, have little variation. Their flattened ends mean that bead work created with cylinder beads has a flat, smooth texture. Rows and columns in weaving line up more uniformly, so detailed pattern work comes out more accurate and even. These beads are more expensive than round seed beads, although the reduced weight of the thin walled cylinder beads results in more beads per gram.

There are three versions of cylinder beads:

- Delica by Miyuki. Delicas are currently (2018) made in four sizes: 15/0 (the smallest), 11/0, 10/0, and 8/0. Delica varieties include a "cut" Delica that reflects light from flat facets.
- Treasures (formerly Antiques) by Toho available in size 11/0
- Aiko by Toho, introduced in 2005, available in size 11/0

=== Cut beads ===
One cut or true cut beads have a flat surface cut into the bead that produces a shine or sparkle when reflecting light. Cut beads that are size 13/0 are referred to as "Charlottes." However, many people refer to all single cut beads as Charlotte cut.

There are three-cut beads which are "barrel faceted", meaning they start with a round bead and make more random machine cuts, creating a nugget like bead. Then in a class of their own is the two-cut seed bead. These never started out as a round bead, but rather the raw cane has been shaved and cut.

=== Bugle beads ===
Bugle beads are longer than they are thick, creating a tubular shape. They have different lengths ranging from 2mm, 3mm to 35mm in length, and may be plain, twisted or faceted (cut). The smallest, #0 at 2mm, is produced by the Toho company.

Bugle beads are sold by size (length) commonly designated as #1 - 3mm, #2 - 4mm, #3 - 6mm, #4 -12mm, and larger (longer) without a number designation, i.e. 30mm, 35mm. The Miyuki bead company designates their bugle beads as #1 - 3mm, #2 - 6mm, #3 - 9mm, #4 - 12mm.

Bugle beads may have round or square holes, which are from .6mm to 1.2mm, getting larger as the length increases.

The style and or finish of bugle beads correspond to the range of styles produced by each company. Many companies provide sample cards which can be viewed digitally on their websites.

== Units of measure ==
The aught system of classifying seed beads is widely used but is imprecise and variable between manufacturers. The measurements given below for bead diameter are meant to suggest the industry standard but are not absolute—in fact, variation from one manufacturer to the next may be greater than the variation within a single aught-size of bead.

The aught size of a bead is usually given either as a number followed by a superscripted zero, e.g., 8°, or most often as a number followed by a slash and a zero, e.g., 8/0. Regardless, this is spoken as, "Eight aught", though the "aught" portion is regularly ignored and an 8/0 size seed bead would usually be described as simply as "Size eight" or "an 8 bead."

Aught size	Diameter (mm)
1/0	6.5
2/0	6.0
3/0	5.5
4/0	5.0
5/0	4.5
6/0	4.0–4.3
7/0	3.4–4.0
8/0	2.5–3.1
9/0	2.2–2.7
10/0	2.0–2.3
11/0	1.8–2.1
12/0	1.7–1.9
13/0	1.5–1.7
14/0	1.4–1.6
15/0	1.30–1.40
16/0	1.25–1.35
17/0	1.2
18/0	1.15–1.20
20/0	1.0–1.17
22/0	1.02
24/0	0.91

== Methods of packaging ==
Seed beads are sold either by hank, gram weight or tube. Style of glass (opaque, transparent, matte) and finish, color, and name may (or may not) be listed along with the companies product number. Names (colors) are often created by the retailer to entice purchases, and vary by retailer. A few carry over from the manufacturers and are used by most retailers: African Sunset Gold #329 by Toho is one example.

=== Hanks ===
A hank is unit bundle of strands of seed beads or bugle beads. A typical hank has twelve 20" (51 cm) strands of beads. Different sizes and types of beads may be sold in hanks which have different numbers and lengths of strands. Different hanks (age, type, size) have from 8 to 14 strands, and lengths vary from 8 to 20 inches per strand. For example, Charlotte size 13/0 cut beads are generally on short hanks, containing 12 twelve-inch strands. Some vintage 18/0 hanks have 10 strands of 8–10 inches (200 to 250 mm) each. 1 hank = 3.333 fathoms = 6.667 yards = 20 feet = 6096mm = 609.6 cm = 6.096 meters = x grams.

Czech seed beads are sold from the factories by boxes, bags or strands. They are often repackaged into hanks, tubes, or other containers for retail sale, in quantities varying from 5 grams to 40 or more grams. When Czech beads are repackaged, they are usually sold by the gram, which creates some confusion on how many beads come on a hank. Not every 20 inch strand of size 11/0 beads weighs the same. However, there are some online calculators, which can be used for conversion from hanks to grams and from grams to hanks.

A hank of size 2/0 bugles or size 11/0 seed beads generally weighs between 30 and 40 grams, depending on manufacturing variations, coatings or linings. Purchasing Czech beads by the hank is usually a better value than repackaged beads.

A production run of a custom made seed bead is eight kilograms. The beads are produced in the Czech Republic using a ten kilogram rod of color glass. The excess glass is recycled to form new rods. The color glass rods are produced from a larger mass melt of some ten metric tons.

=== Weight ===
Japanese beads are sold by gram weight, seldom by the hank. Buying Japanese beads by the hank usually costs about twice as much, therefore, they are not usually sold or purchased from Japan in this manner.

Most Japanese seed beads are repackaged for retail sale in manageable quantities based on price codes. More expensive beads (precious metals) may be sold in 2.5 or 5 gram units. Standard Japanese seed beads are usually sold in approximately 5 or 10 gram packages.

One major supplier, Miyuki, sells factory packages which contain up to 1 kg of beads, and are almost always repackaged into tubes or other containers for retail sale. To accommodate the average "wholesale" customer, whether it be a bead shop or designer, some larger distributors have made deals to receive their wholesale packages of beads in smaller (50 to 250 gram) pre-packaged sizes.

Toho, a major Japanese supplier, seems to have a more flexible packaging policy. Many of the tubed seed beads that can be found in craft stores are stamped with their name on the bottoms, indicating both a wholesale and retail packaging setup.
