= Bead knitting =

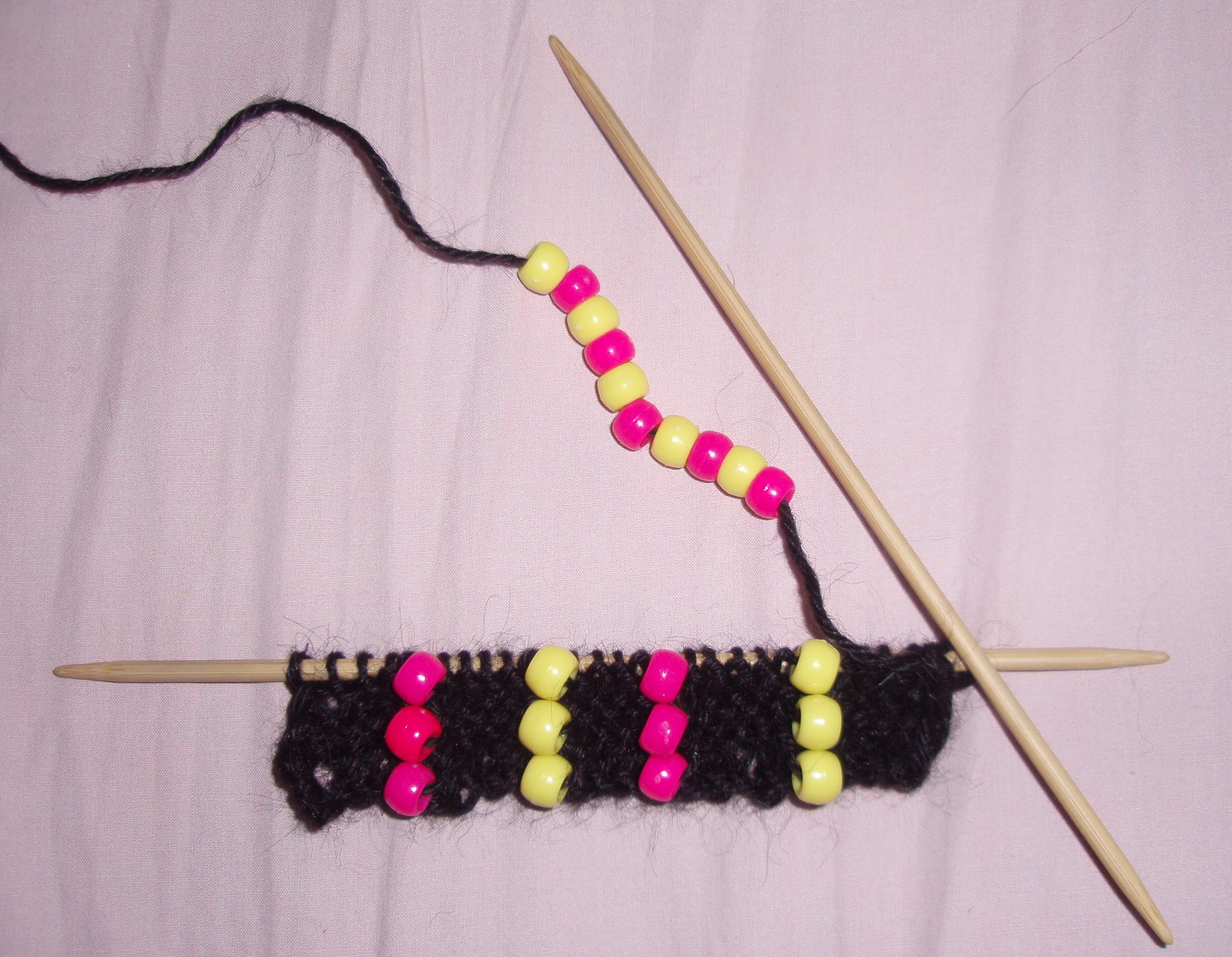
beaded knitting on double points, with the beads threaded on in advance

Beaded knitting is a type of knitting in which the stitches are decorated with ceramic or glass beads.

== History of bead knitting ==
In the Victorian era, it was popular to knit densely beaded purses using tiny knitting needles made of stiff wire, much smaller (less than 1 mm) than the smallest knitting needle easily available commercially today. Such tiny stitches allow for very intricate patterns. Very small lace needles, as small as 0.5 mm diameter, are available from specialty retailers.

== Techniques ==
There are two main approaches: threading the beads on in advance, and threading the beads on individually as the object is knitted.

The techniques are described here for beads, but knitting sequins (and other perforated objects) can be done analogously.

=== Thread in advance ===
The classic approach is to thread beads on the yarn in advance. There are several ways to go about knitting the beads in though: slipping the stitch, putting the bead between stitches, and putting the bead on the stitch.

The slip stitch method is to slip the stitch with the yarn (and bead) in front at the position where a bead is desired. The bead will be visible only on the right side of the work. The disadvantage of this method is that beads cannot be arranged on top of each other, since the same stitch would have to be slipped multiple times. The axis of the bead is horizontal to the work.

Putting the bead between the two stitches is done by positioning the bead on the yarn connecting two stitches, i.e., between two bights. This results in the bead being visible from both sides of the work when beads are slipped on both sides. The bead has a tendency to not lie straight when placed with this method. The axis of the bead is horizontal with respect to the work. This is the method shown in the picture.

The third method is to knit the stitch with the bead on the bight itself. Technically, this is considered "bead knitting" rather than "beaded knitting." For consistency, the bead should be positioned on the same leg of the bight. Using this third method, one can make a densely beaded knitted fabric, i.e., one that appears to be all beads, with no knitted yarns visible. It is sometimes difficult, however, to keep the bead on the right side of the fabric; for this reason, the stitches are often twisted, to tighten up the fabric.

=== Thread during knitting ===
A second approach that offers more flexibility is to thread the bead onto the bight, i.e., onto the loop before it is knitted. (The rotational axis of the bead is aligned vertically.) In this case, the beads appears on both sides of the fabric. The chief drawback of this method is that the beads must be larger, since two strands of the yarn pass through the bead. In this approach, it is helpful to make an elongated stitch to fit both the bead and the next stitch.

A third approach is to sew on the beads after knitting. This approach is the least desirable, since it does not protect the yarn as well and since the sewing thread is usually weaker than the yarn.
