= Peyote stitch =

Off-loom bead weaving technique

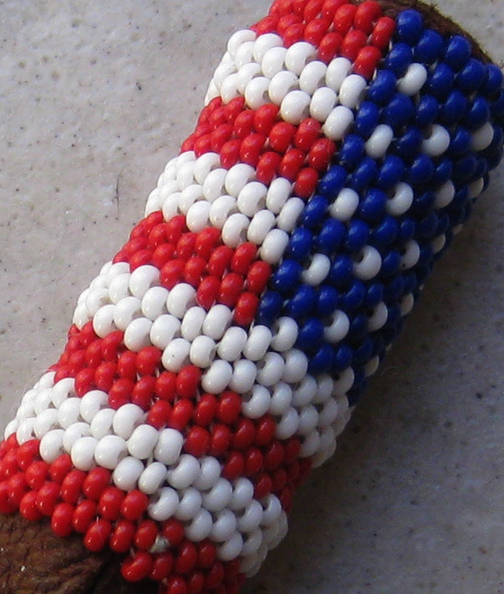
Example of Native American peyote stitch from Oklahoma

The peyote stitch, also known as the gourd stitch, is an off-loom bead weaving technique. Peyote stitch may be worked with either an even or an odd number of beads per row. Both even and odd count peyote pieces can be woven as flat strips, in a flat round shape, or as a tube. Tubular peyote is used to make pouches or to decorate objects such as bottles or fan handles.

Many cultures around the world have used peyote stitch in their beadwork. Examples of peyote stitch have been found in artifacts from Ancient Egypt, and the stitch has also been used in historic and contemporary Native American beadwork. The name "peyote stitch" derives from the use of this stitch to decorate objects used in peyote ceremonies by members of the Native American Church. The name "gourd stitch" similarly derives from the use of the stitch in decorating gourd containers.

== Variations on Peyote stitch ==
A variation of the peyote stitch is often referred to as the fast peyote stitch as its use resembles peyote, but it can be done in less time.

Much like the first two rows of a peyote stitch project, the speed stitch requires two rows be strung then worked in. It can only be done with an even number of beads but is easily done in either flat or tubular peyote. Peyote Stitch can be done in the round, on the diagonal, flat or tubular.

A new form of peyote stitch has been created by Gerlinde Linz. This is called “Peyote With A Twist”, not “bead crochet”. Often abbreviated to PWAT, although Linz prefers to refer to it as “Peytwist”. This form of diagonal peyote, when worked up into a chain can form the look of a crochet rope.

The Cellini spiral is a variation on the Peyote stitch that uses beads of increasing size to create a textured surface. It was originated by seed bead masters Virginia Blakelock and Carol Perenoud who developed the tubular variation and named it after Benvenuto Cellini, a 16th-century Italian sculptor known for his Rococo architectural columns.

Outside of Oklahoma, the Sioux of South Carolina also make these styles of beadwork, where the beadwork is limited to men rather than women.

== History ==
Beading samples of the peyote stitch can be found in the Middle East dating back to 2,000 years ago. Most notably, the tomb of King Tutankhamun contains many artifacts utilizing the stitch. The Egyptians created broad collars with the stitch with molded tubular beads. These collars are depicted on gods, kings, and others.

Not only has the stitch been found in the Middle East, but Native Americans have also been using it for centuries. Native American beadwork began using glass beads when the Europeans brought over glass beads. The peyote stitch got its modern name from the Kiowa and Comanche Tribes in the 1800s. Modern Native American beadwork uses the peyote stitch in jewelry, objects, and traditional objects.

== See also ==
- Brick stitch – Off-loom bead weaving technique
- Square stitch
