= Pomegranates in culture =

Pomegranates have been significant in culture and religious rituals since ancient times, holding symbolic value in the civilisations of Ancient Assyria, Iran, Egypt, Greece, and Israel, as well as in Christianity and Islam.

== Ancient civilisations ==
=== Ancient Assyria ===
The pomegranate was an important fruit in the culture and rituals of ancient Assyria. The Mesopotamian goddess of healing, Gula, was commonly depicted with a pomegranate in her hand, symbolising it as a means of protection and healing from sickness. Pomegranates were commonly used in ceremonies to promote agriculture and human reproduction, especially the seeds. It was believed that eating pomegranates would grant a long and prosperous life, as well as nourishment in the afterlife, due to the belief of the seeds representing eternal life.

Pomegranates were commonly depicted in Assyrian art pieces to depict abundance and fruitfulness with the agricultural cycle, and in the Metropolitan Museum of Art is an ivory bead object titled Pomegranate carved in the round. Today, the pomegranate remains an important symbol in modern Assyrian culture.

=== Ancient Iran ===
Pomegranate, known as anār in Persian, is a symbol of fertility, blessing, and favour in Iranian belief. Pomegranates are sacred in the Zoroastrian religion and Zoroastrians used it in their religious rituals. The yellow colour of the pomegranate stamens symbolises the sun and light.

The pomegranate tree has been one of the most sacred and holy plants in Iran and is believed to be grown from places where the blood of Siyâvash, a legendary Iranian hero character who is known for his innocence, was spilled. It has been mentioned in Iranian Pahlavi scripts as a fruit of heaven. It is also believed that the invulnerability of Esfandiyār, another Iranian legend, was related to pomegranate. The Zoroastrians of Iran believe that pomegranate is a blessed fruit; it is served in their festivals like Mehregan and Nowruz, and in their wedding ceremonies to wish for the newly married couple to have healthy children in the future. They also used to plant a pomegranate tree in each of their fire temples to use its leaves in their ceremonies.

During the Iranian tradition of Yalda Night, people come together on the winter solstice and eat pomegranate seeds to celebrate the victory of light over darkness.

In a relief from Persepolis, Darius the Great is holding a pomegranate flower with two buds. This Achaemenid king is accepting the representatives of all the subordinate lands of Greater Iran to his presence, while holding a large flower in his hand as a sign of peace and friendship.

=== Ancient Egypt ===
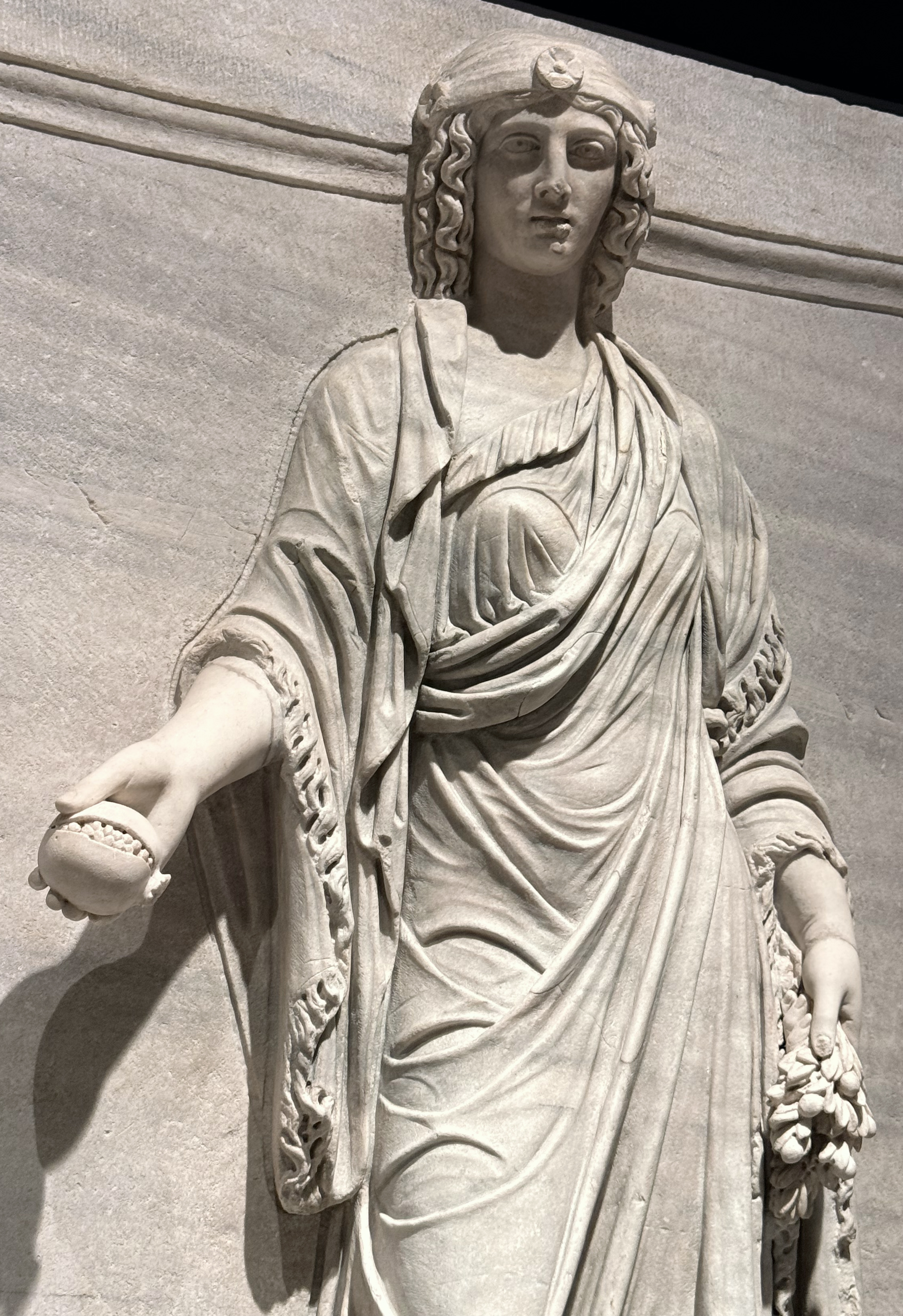
Ancient Roman statue of Aegyptus, personification of the province of Egypt holding a pomegranate

Ancient Egyptians regarded the pomegranate as a symbol of prosperity and ambition. It was referred to by the Semitic names of jnhm or nhm. According to the Ebers Papyrus, one of the oldest medical writings from around 1500 BC, Egyptians used the pomegranate for treatment of tapeworm and other infections.

=== Ancient and modern Greece ===
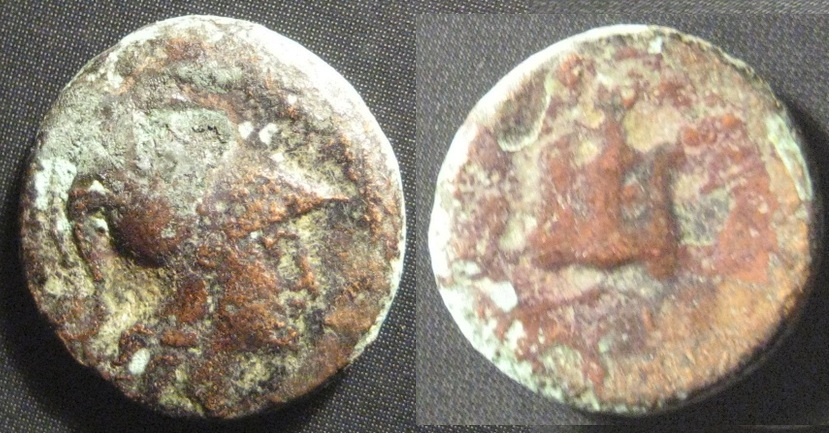
Bronze coin of Side from Pamphylia, Turkey, 350–300 BC: *obverse: a Crested Corinthian-helmeted bust of Athena right; *reverse: a pomegranate fruit

A pomegranate is displayed on coins from Side, as Side was the name for pomegranate in the local language, which is the city's name. The ancient Greek city of Side was in Pamphylia, a former region on the southern Mediterranean coast of Asia Minor (modern-day Antalya province, Turkey).

The Greeks were familiar with the fruit far before it was introduced to Rome via Carthage, and it figures in multiple myths and artworks. In Ancient Greek mythology, the pomegranate was known as the "fruit of the dead", and believed to have sprung from the blood of Adonis.

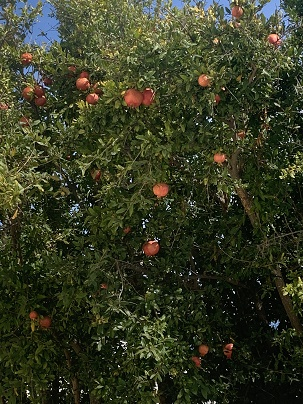
A pomegranate tree at Fira, Santorini (Thera), Greece

The myth of Persephone, the goddess of the underworld, prominently features her consumption of pomegranate seeds, requiring her to spend a certain number of months in the underworld every year. The number of seeds and therefore months vary. During the months that Persephone sits on the throne of the underworld beside her husband Hades, her mother Demeter mourns and no longer gives fertility to the earth. This was an ancient Greek explanation for the seasons.

According to Carl A. P. Ruck and Danny Staples, the chambered pomegranate is also a surrogate for the poppy's narcotic capsule, with its comparable shape and chambered interior.

In another Greek myth, a girl named Side ("pomegranate") killed herself on her mother's grave to avoid suffering rape at the hands of her own father Ictinus. Her blood transformed into a pomegranate tree. In a different myth, a Boeotian woman named Side was cast into the Underworld by Hera, with the pomegranate symbolising her descent.

In the fifth century BC, Polycleitus took ivory and gold to sculpt the seated Argive Hera in her temple. She held a scepter in one hand and offered a pomegranate, like a "royal orb", in the other. "About the pomegranate I must say nothing", whispered the traveller Pausanias in the second century, "for its story is somewhat of a holy mystery". The pomegranate has a calyx shaped like a crown. In Jewish tradition, it has been seen as the original "design" for the proper crown.

Within the Heraion at the mouth of the Sele, near Paestum, Magna Graecia, is a chapel devoted to the Madonna del Granato, "Our Lady of the Pomegranate", "who by virtue of her epithet and the attribute of a pomegranate must be the Christian successor of the ancient Greek goddess Hera", observes the excavator of the Heraion of Samos, Helmut Kyrieleis.

In modern times, the pomegranate still holds strong symbolic meanings for the Greeks. When one buys a new home, it is conventional for a house guest to bring as a first gift a pomegranate, which is placed under/near the ikonostasi (home altar) of the house, as a symbol of abundance, fertility, and good luck. When Greeks commemorate their dead, they make kollyva as offerings, which consist of boiled wheat, mixed with sugar and decorated with pomegranate. Pomegranate decorations for the home are very common in Greece and sold in most home goods stores.

=== Ancient Israel and Judaism ===
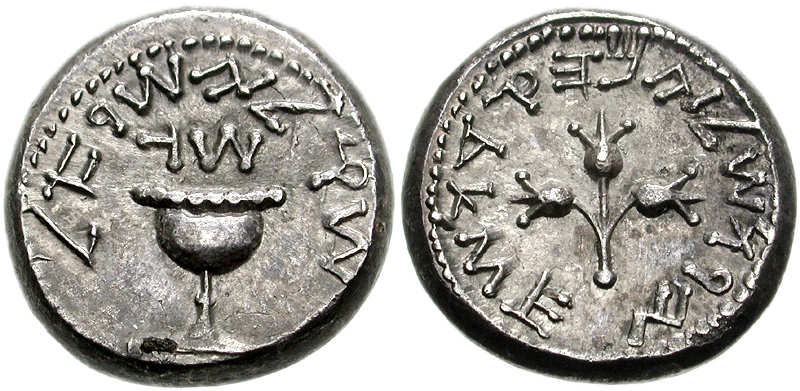
A sprig of pomegranates (right) depicted on a silver shekel of the Great Jewish Revolt (66–73 AD), featuring the inscription 'Jerusalem the Holy' in Paleo-Hebrew script

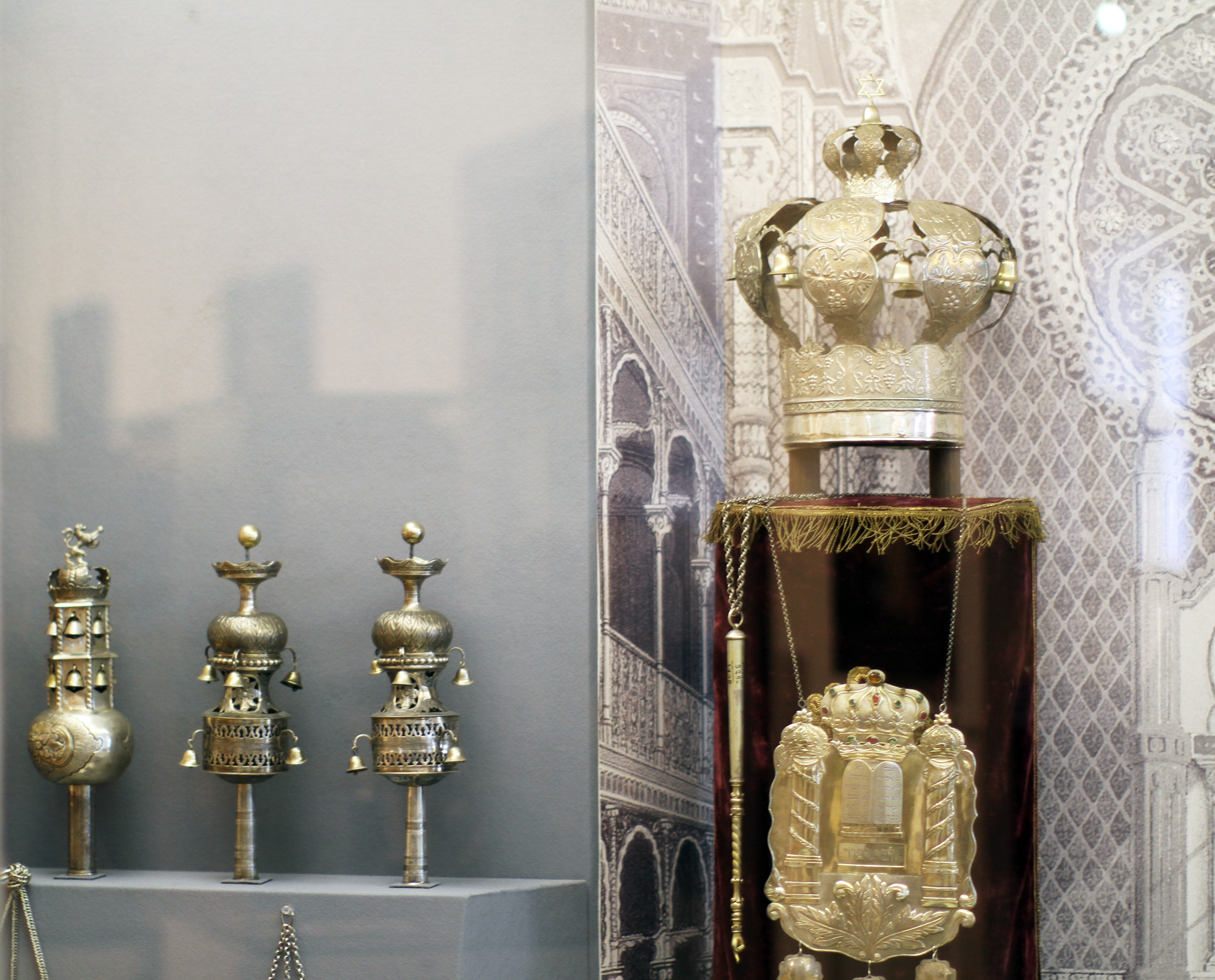
Jewish Torah ornaments in the shape of pomegranates

Pomegranate is one of the Seven Species of fruit and grains enumerated in the Hebrew Bible as special products of the Land of Israel. The Song of Songs mentions the pomegranate six times, often as a symbol of beauty and fertility. Some Jewish scholars believe the pomegranate was the forbidden fruit in the Garden of Eden, as described in the Book of Genesis. The pomegranate appeared on the ancient coins of Judaea, see Hasmonean, Herodian and First Jewish Revolt coinage. The handles of Torah scrolls, when not in use, are sometimes covered with decorative silver globes similar in shape to pomegranates (Torah rimmonim).

Consuming pomegranates on Rosh Hashana, the Jewish New Year, is traditional because, with its numerous seeds, it is a symbol of fruitfulness. The pomegranate is said to have 613 seeds representing the 613 commandments of the Torah, but it is a misconception. There is no clear source for this claim, although it is used as a metaphor in the Talmud for numerous good deeds.

== Religions ==
=== In European Christian motifs ===
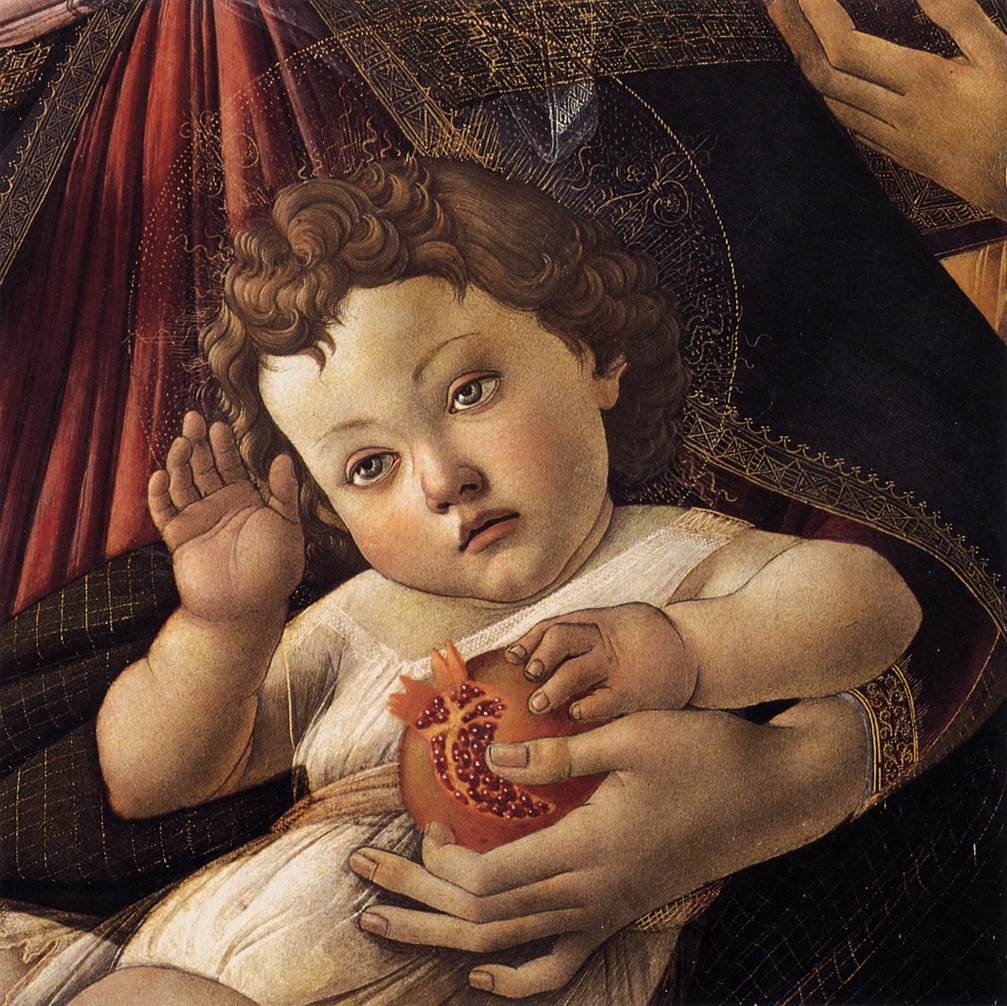
Detail from Botticelli's Madonna of the Pomegranate c. 1487

In the earliest incontrovertible appearance of Christ in a mosaic, a fourth-century floor mosaic from Hinton St Mary, Dorset, now in the British Museum, the bust of Christ and the chi rho are flanked by pomegranates. Pomegranates continue to be a motif often found in Christian religious decoration. They are often woven into the fabric of vestments and liturgical hangings or wrought in metalwork. Pomegranates figure in many religious paintings by the likes of Sandro Botticelli and Leonardo da Vinci, often in the hands of the Virgin Mary or the infant Jesus. The fruit, broken or bursting open, is a symbol of the fullness of Jesus' suffering and resurrection.

=== In Islam ===
Chapter 55 of the Quran mentions the pomegranate as a "favour" among many to be offered to those fearful to the "Lord" in "two Gardens".

== Modern ==
=== Armenia ===
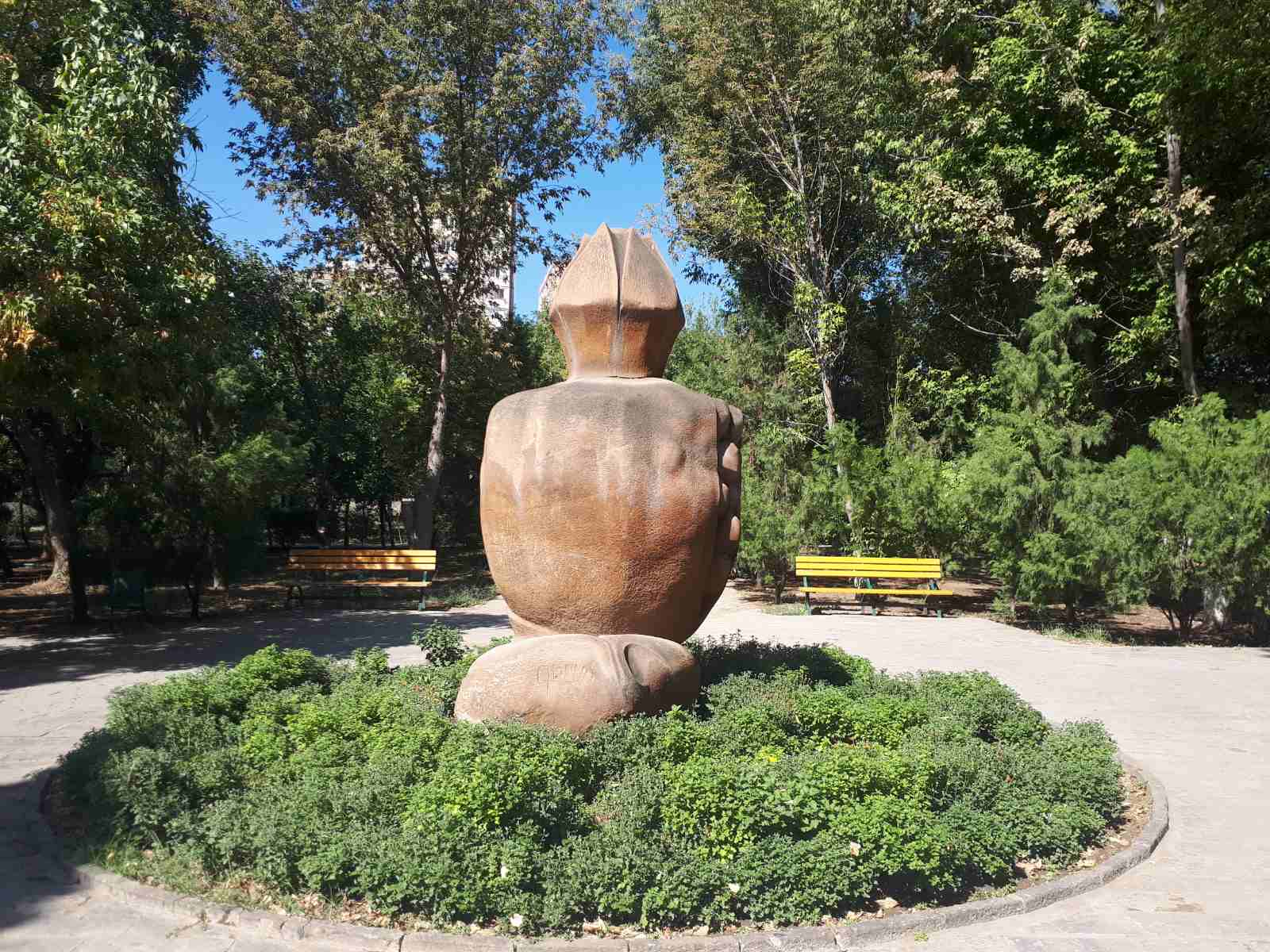
A pomegranate statue in Yerevan, Armenia

The pomegranate is one of the main fruit in Armenian culture (alongside apricots and grapes). Its juice is used with Armenian food and wine. The pomegranate is a symbol in Armenia, representing fertility, abundance, and marriage. It is also a semireligious icon. For example, the fruit played an integral role in a wedding custom widely practiced in ancient Armenia; a bride was given a pomegranate fruit, which she threw against a wall, breaking it into pieces. Scattered pomegranate seeds ensured the bride's future children.

The Color of Pomegranates, a movie directed by Sergei Parajanov, is a biography of the Armenian ashug Sayat-Nova (King of Song) which attempts to reveal the poet's life visually and poetically rather than literally.

=== Azerbaijan ===
Every fall the Goychay Pomegranate Festival is held in the city of Goychay.

=== China ===
Introduced to China during the Han dynasty (206 BC – 220 AD), the pomegranate (Chinese: 石榴; pinyin: shíliu), in older times, was considered an emblem of fertility and numerous progeny. Pictures of the ripe fruit with the seeds bursting forth were often hung in homes to bestow fertility and bless the dwelling with numerous offspring, an important facet of traditional Chinese culture.

In modern times, the pomegranate has been used to symbolise national cohesion and ethnic unity by General Secretary of the Chinese Communist Party Xi Jinping, advocating for the Chinese population to "stick together like pomegranate seeds".

=== India ===
In some Hindu traditions, the pomegranate (Sanskrit: dāḍima) symbolises prosperity and fertility, and is associated with both Bhumi (the earth goddess) and Ganesha (the one fond of the many-seeded fruit).

=== Kurdish ===
The pomegranate is an important fruit and symbol in Kurdish culture. It is accepted as a symbol of abundance and a sacred fruit of ancient Kurdish religions. Pomegranate is used as a symbol of abundance in Kurdish carpets.

=== Palestinian ===
In Palestinian culture, the pomegranate symbolises fertility and is deeply embedded in folklore and traditions. A popular saying states, "The pomegranate fills the heart with faith", and it is believed that every seed should be eaten, as one [pomegranate seed] may have come from paradise.
