= Bead =

Small decorative object with central hole

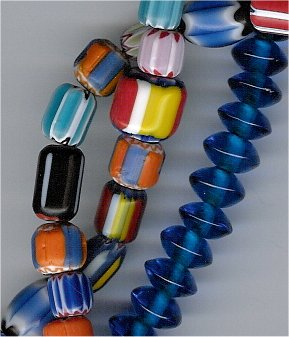
A selection of glass beads

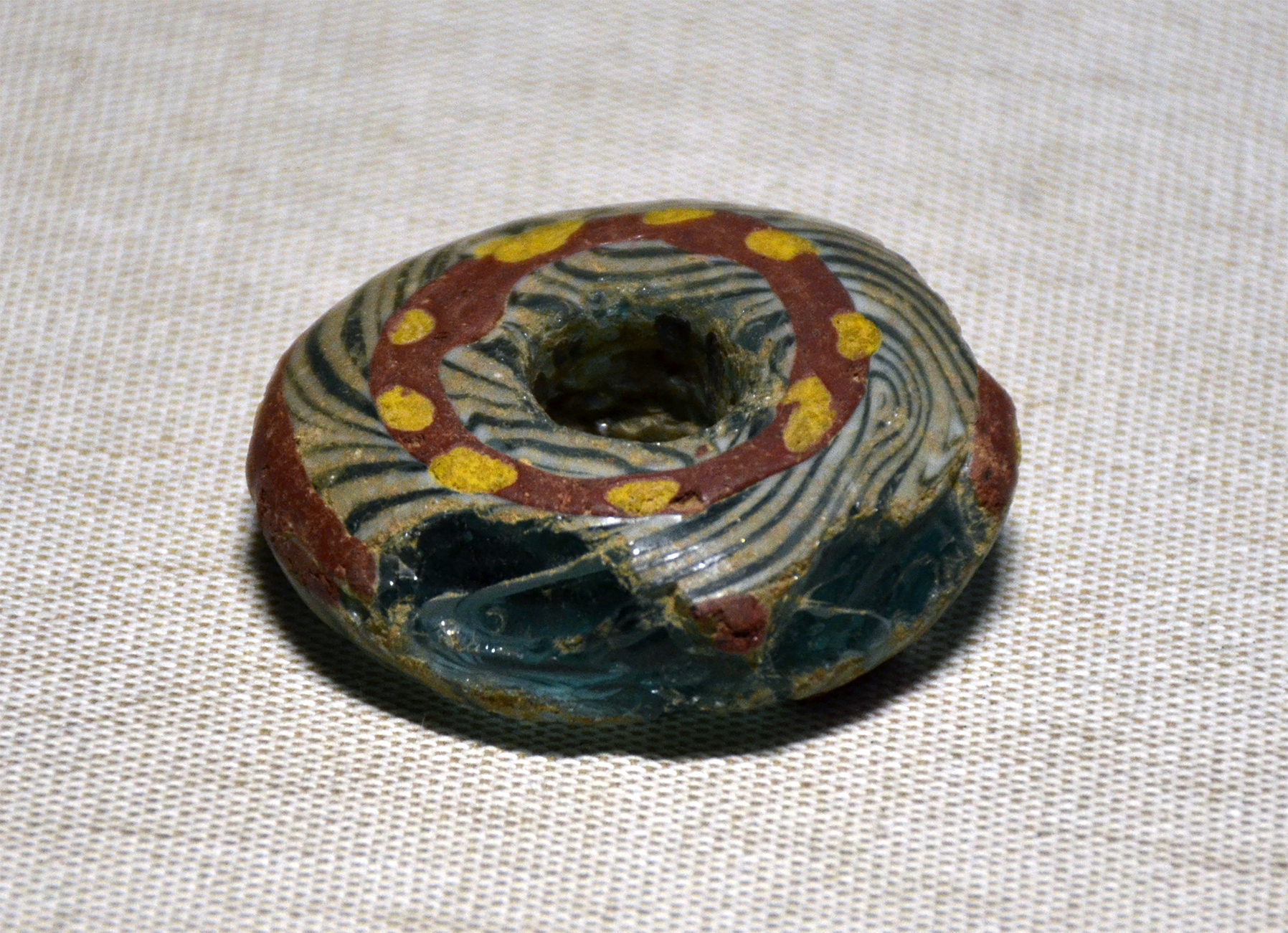
Merovingian bead

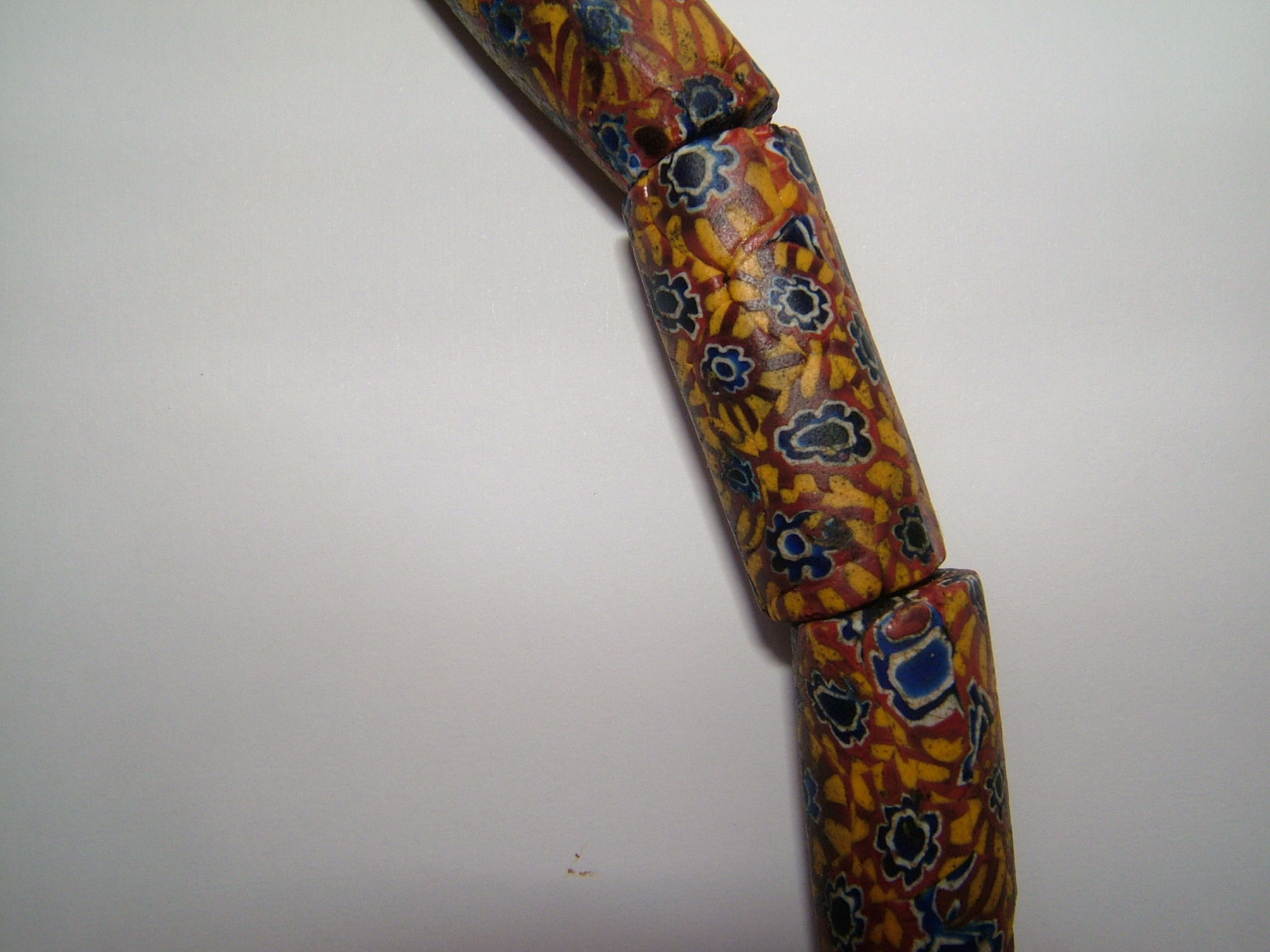
Trade beads, 18th century

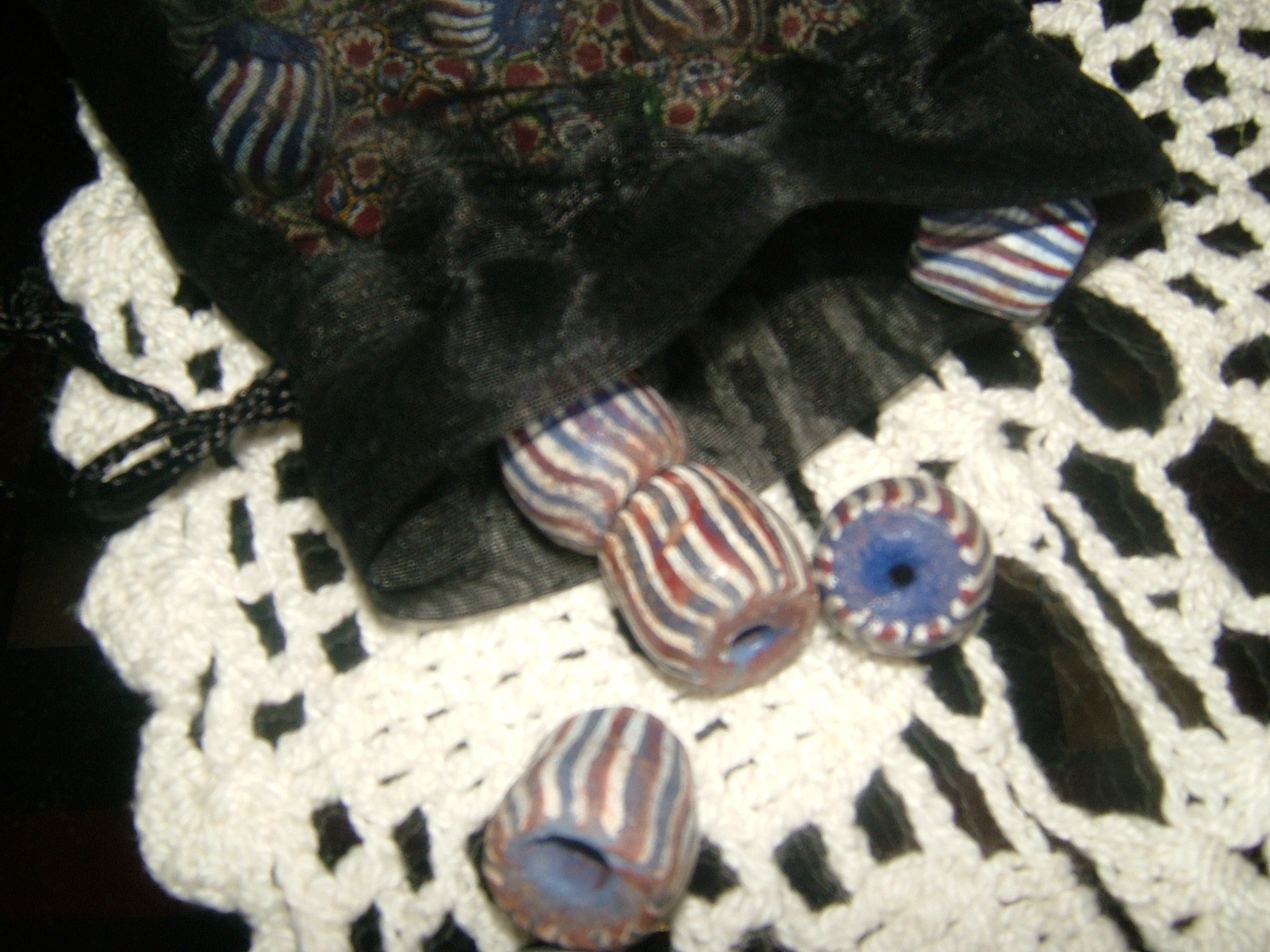
Trade beads, 18th century

A bead is a small, decorative object that is formed in a variety of shapes and sizes of a material such as stone, bone, shell, glass, plastic, wood, or pearl and with a small hole for threading or stringing. Beads range in size from under 1 mm to over 1 cm in diameter.

Beads represent some of the earliest forms of jewellery, with a pair of beads made from Nassarius sea snail shells dating to approximately 100000 years ago thought to be the earliest known example. Beadwork is the art or craft of making things with beads. Beads can be woven together with specialized thread, strung onto thread or soft, flexible wire, or adhered to a surface (e.g. fabric, clay).

== Etymology ==
The word bead derives from Old English gebed, originally meaning "prayer", until transferred to small globular objects. This refers to the use of beads for counting repetitions of prayers, as in Christian Pater Noster cords and rosaries.

== Types ==
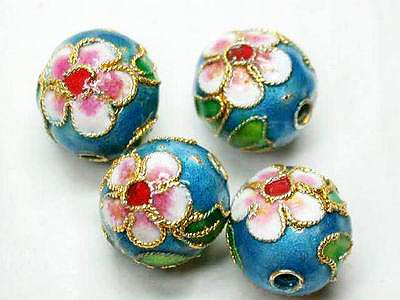
Cloisonné beads

Beads can be divided into several types of overlapping categories based on different criteria such as the materials from which they are made, the process used in their manufacturing, the place or period of origin, the patterns on their surface, or their general shape. In some cases, such as millefiori and cloisonné beads, multiple categories may overlap in an interdependent fashion.

== Components ==
Beads can be made of many different materials. The earliest beads were made of a variety of natural materials which could be readily drilled and shaped. As humans became capable of obtaining and working with more difficult materials, those materials were added to the range of available substances.

In modern manufacturing, the most common bead materials are wood, plastic, glass, metal, and stone.

=== Natural materials ===
Beads are still made from many naturally occurring materials, both organic (i.e., of animal- or plant-based origin) and inorganic (purely mineral origin). Some of these materials now routinely undergo extra processing beyond mere shaping and drilling, such as color enhancement via dyes or irradiation.

The natural organics include bone, coral, horn, ivory, seeds (such as tagua nuts), animal shells, and wood. For most of human history, pearls were the ultimate precious beads of natural origin because of their rarity. The modern pearl-culturing process has made them far more common. Amber and jet are also of natural organic origin, although both are the result of partial fossilization.

The natural inorganics include various types of stones, ranging from gemstones to common minerals, and metals. Of the latter, only a few precious metals occur in pure forms, but other purified base metals may as well be placed in this category along with certain naturally occurring alloys such as electrum.

=== Synthetic materials ===
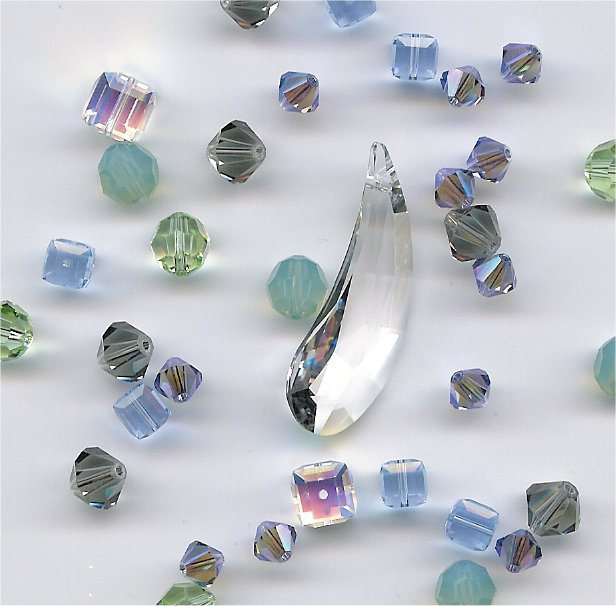
Swarovski crystal beads (6–8 mm (0.24–0.31 in)), pendant 3 cm (1.2 in)

Swedish patent 217875: The plastic bead pegboard (1962)

The oldest-surviving synthetic materials used for bead making have generally been ceramics: pottery and glass. Beads were also made from ancient alloys such as bronze and brass, but as those were more vulnerable to oxidation they have generally been less well-preserved at archaeological sites.

Many different subtypes of glass are now used for beadmaking, some of which have their component-specific names. Lead crystal beads have a high percentage of lead oxide in the glass formula, increasing the refractive index. Most of the other named glass types have their formulations and patterns inseparable from the manufacturing process.

Small, colorful, fusible plastic beads can be placed on a solid plastic-backed peg array to form designs and then melted together with a clothes iron; alternatively, they can be strung into necklaces and bracelets or woven into keychains. Fusible beads come in many colors and degrees of transparency/opacity, including varieties that glow in the dark or have internal glitter; peg boards come in various shapes and several geometric patterns. Plastic toy beads, made by chopping plastic tubes into short pieces, were introduced in 1958 by Munkplast AB in Munka-Ljungby, Sweden. Known as Indian beads, they were originally sewn together to form ribbons. The pegboard for bead designs was invented in the early 1960s (patented 1962, patent granted 1967) by Gunnar Knutsson in Vällingby, Sweden, as a therapy for elderly homes; the pegboard later gained popularity as a toy for children.^{[1]} The bead designs were glued to cardboard or Masonite boards and used as trivets. Later, when the beads were made of polyethylene, it became possible to fuse them with a flat iron. Hama come in three sizes: mini (diameter 2 mm (0.079 in)), midi (5 mm (0.20 in)) and maxi (10 mm (0.39 in)).^{[2]} Perler beads come in two sizes called classic (5 mm) and biggie (10 mm). Pyssla beads (by IKEA) only come in one size (5 mm).

== Manufacturing ==
Modern mass-produced beads are generally shaped by carving or casting, depending on the material and desired effect. In some cases, more specialized metalworking or glassworking techniques may be employed, or a combination of multiple techniques and materials may be used such as in cloisonné.

Beads are small circular shapes that come in different shapes and sizes. The materials are made from different qualities such as color, shape, shine, pattern, or even exotic materials used, etc. In making beads, they have to have holes in the center in putting through a string to hold the beads together using different techniques that can help. Some archaeologists had been working at Blombos cave located in South Africa, there was a recent discovery showing forty-one marine shell (Nassarius kraussianus) beads. It was estimated that it was made about seventy-five thousand years ago.

=== Glassworking ===
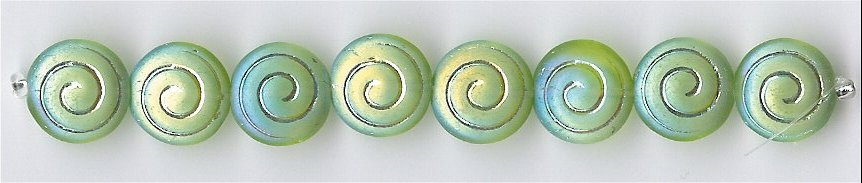
Pressed glass beads (matte finish with an AB coating)

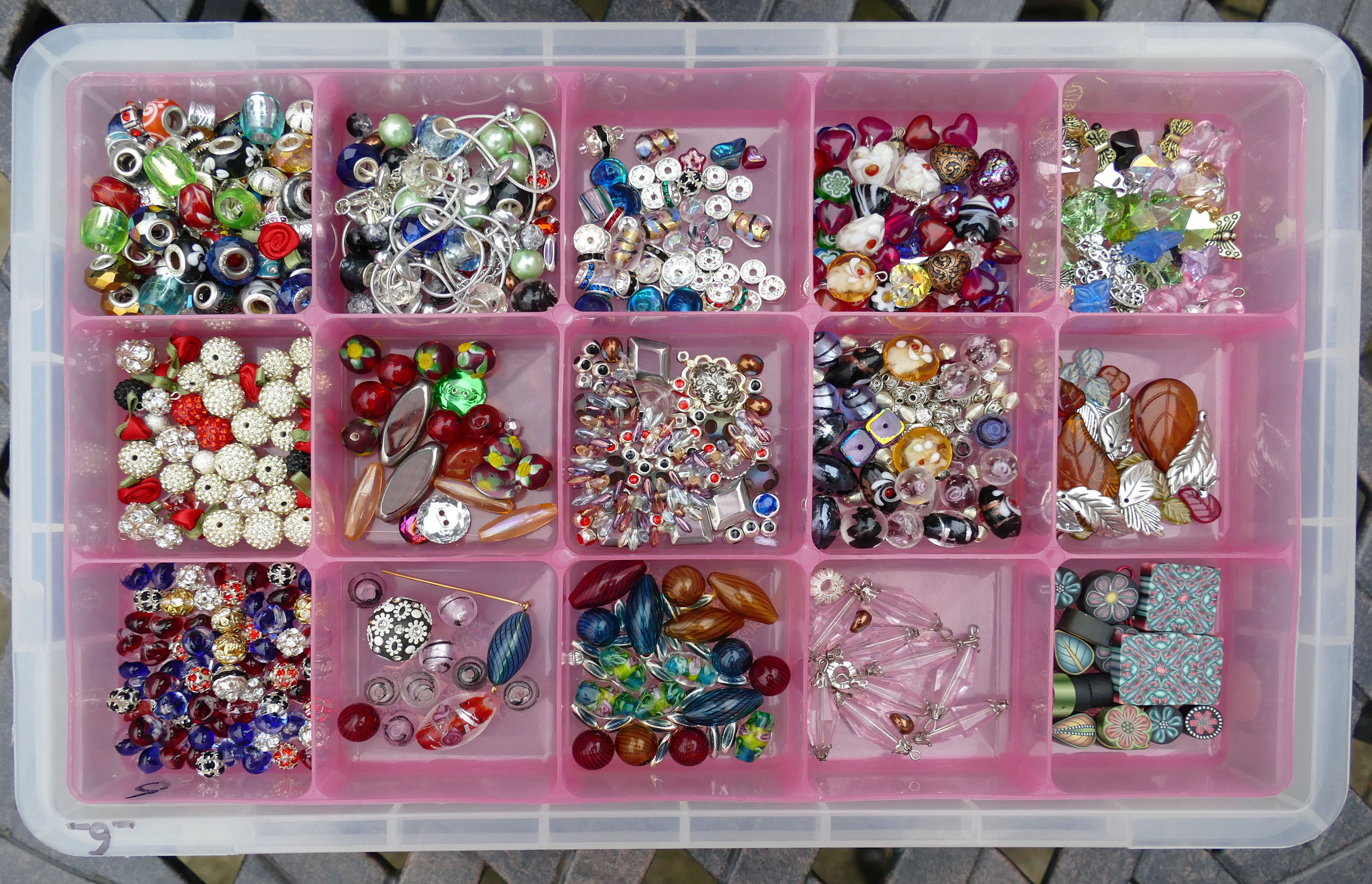
A box of assorted beads

Most glass beads are pressed glass, mass-produced by preparing a molten batch of glass of the desired color and pouring it into molds to form the desired shape. This is also true of most plastic beads.

A smaller and more expensive subset of glass and lead crystal beads are cut into precise faceted shapes on an individual basis. This was once done by hand but has largely been taken over by precision machinery.

"Fire-polished" faceted beads are a less expensive alternative to hand-cut faceted glass or crystal. They derive their name from the second half of a two-part process: first, the glass batch is poured into round bead molds, then they are faceted with a grinding wheel. The faceted beads are then poured onto a tray and briefly reheated just long enough to melt the surface, "polishing" out any minor surface irregularities from the grinding wheel.

==== Specialized glass techniques and types ====
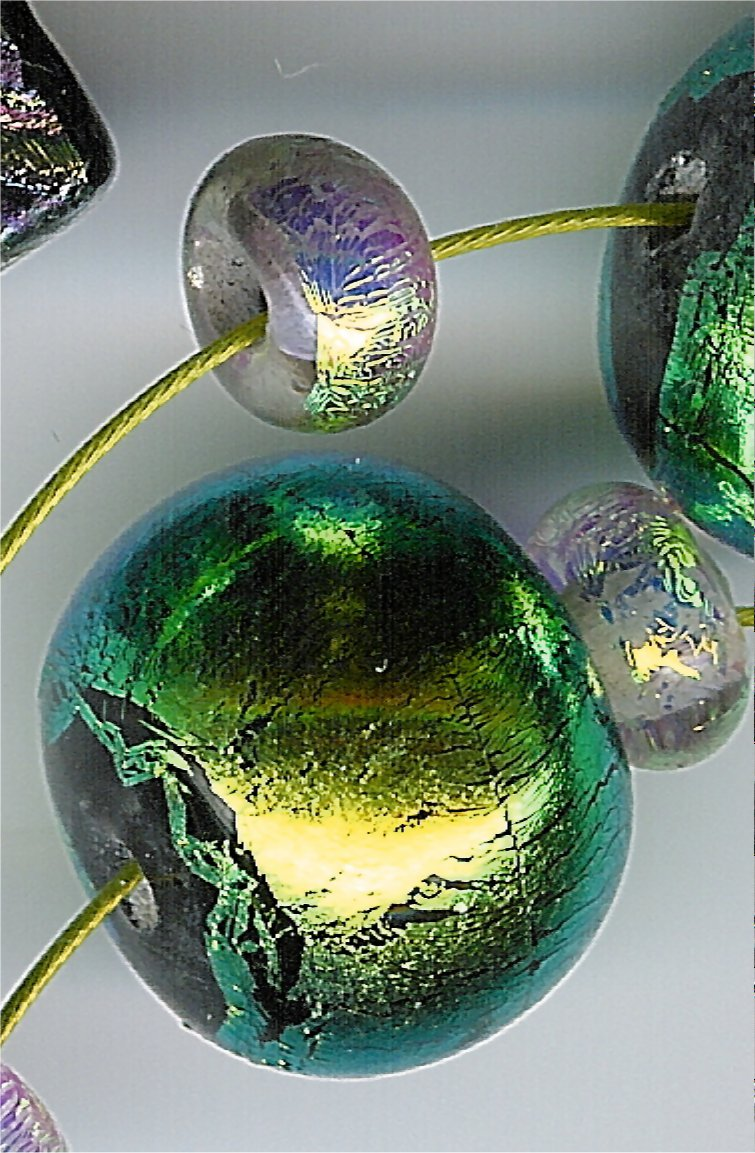
Dichroic beads (10 millimetres (0.39 in))

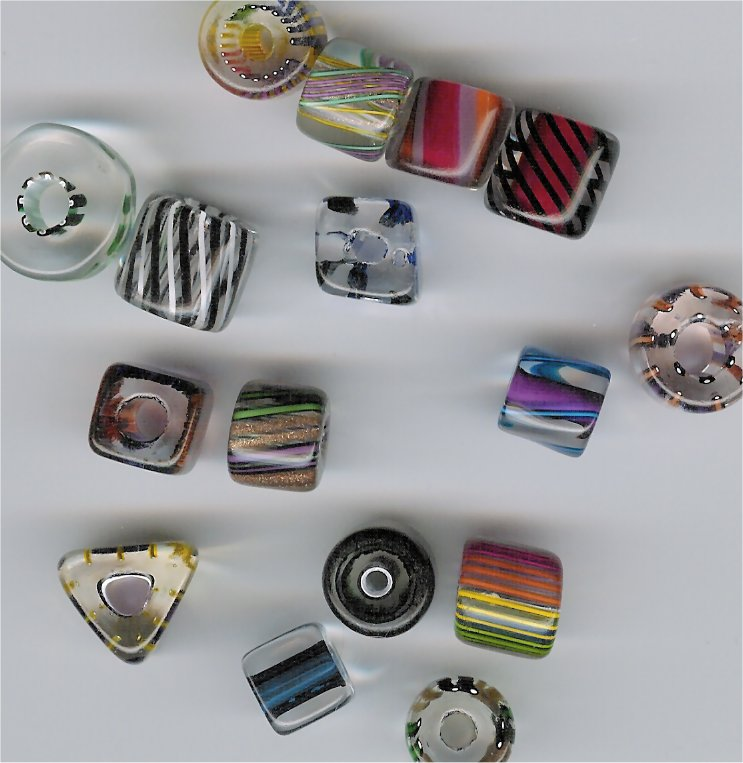
Furnace glass beads

There are several specialized glassworking techniques that create a distinctive appearance throughout the body of the resulting beads, which are then primarily referred to by the glass type.

If the glass batch is used to create a large massive block instead of pre-shaping it as it cools, the result may then be carved into smaller items in the same manner as stone. Conversely, glass artisans may make beads by lampworking the glass on an individual basis; once formed, the beads undergo little or no further shaping after the layers have been properly annealed.

Most of these glass subtypes are some form of fused glass, although goldstone is created by controlling the reductive atmosphere and cooling conditions of the glass batch rather than by fusing separate components together.

Dichroic glass beads incorporate a semitransparent microlayer of metal between two or more layers. Fibre optic glass beads have an eyecatching chatoyant effect across the grain.

There are also several ways to fuse many small glass canes together into a multicolored pattern, resulting in millefiori beads or chevron beads (sometimes called "trade beads"). "Furnace glass" beads encase a multicolored core in a transparent exterior layer which is then annealed in a furnace.

More economically, millefiori beads can also be made by limiting the patterning process to long, narrow canes or rods known as murrine. Thin cross-sections, or "decals", can then be cut from the murrine and fused into the surface of a plain glass bead.

== Place or period of origin ==
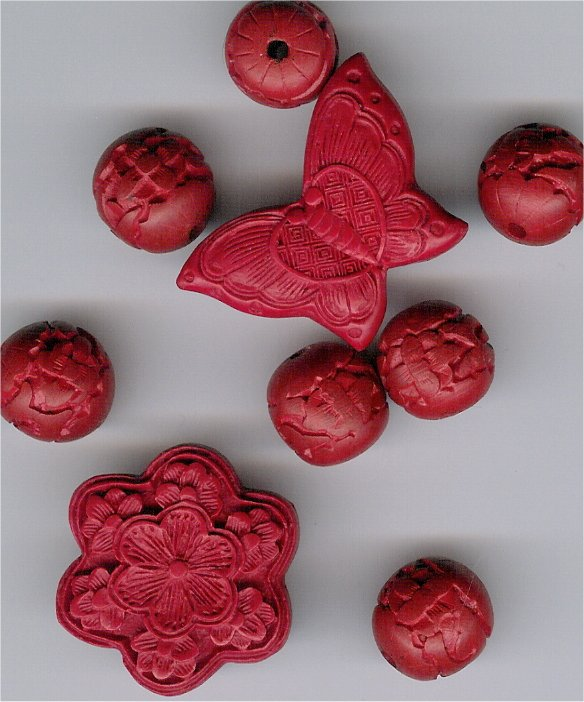
Carved Cinnabar lacquer beads

- African trade beads or slave beads may be antique beads that were manufactured in Europe and used for trade during the colonial period, such as chevron beads; or they may have been made in West Africa by and for Africans, such as Mauritanian Kiffa beads, Ghanaian and Nigerian powder glass beads, or African-made brass beads. Archaeologists have documented that as recently as the late-nineteenth century beads manufactured in Europe continued to accompany exploration of Africa using Indigenous routes into the interior.
- Austrian crystal is a generic term for cut lead-crystal beads, based on the location and prestige of the Swarovski firm.
- Czech glass beads are made in the Czech Republic, in particular an area called Jablonec nad Nisou. Production of glass beads in the area dates back to the 14th century, though production was depressed under communist rule. Because of this long tradition, their workmanship and quality has an excellent reputation.
- Islamic glass beads have been made in a wide geographical and historical range of Islamic cultures. Used and manufactured from medieval Spain and North Africa in the West and to China in the East, they can be identified by recognizable features, including styles and techniques.
- Vintage beads, in the collectibles and antique market, refers to items that are at least 25 or more years old. Vintage beads are available in materials that include lucite, plastic, crystal, metal and glass.

=== Miscellaneous ethnic beads ===
Tibetan Dzi beads and Rudraksha beads are used to make Buddhist and Hindu rosaries (malas). Magatama are traditional Japanese beads, and cinnabar was often used for making beads in China. Wampum are cylindrical white or purple beads made from quahog or North Atlantic channeled whelk shells by northeastern Native American tribes, such as the Wampanoag and Shinnecock. Job's tears are seed beads popular among southeastern Native American tribes. Heishe are beads made of shells or stones by the Kewa Pueblo people of New Mexico.

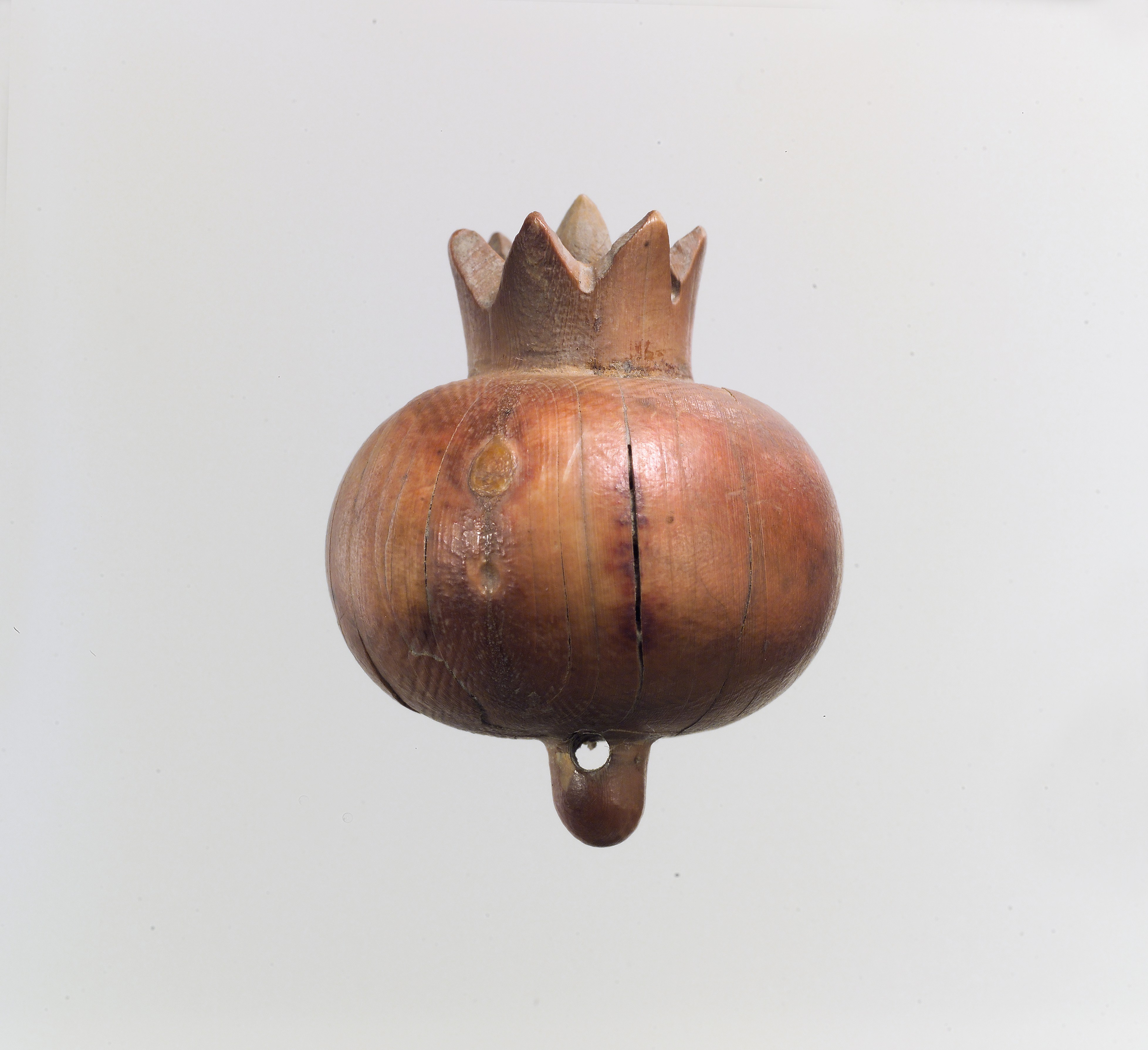
Bead, depicting a pomegranate, dated to the Assyrian Empire of the 8th century BCE.

== Uses ==
- For prayer or devotion - e.g. rosaries and Pater Noster cords for Christians, misbaha for Muslims, japamala/nenju, Rudraksha for Hindus, Buddhists, Jains, some Sikhs, Confucianism, Taoists/Daoists, Shinto, etc. The English word bead derives from Old English gebed, meaning "prayer", reflecting this use of beads.
- For anti-tension devices, e.g. Greek komboloi ("worry beads").
- As currency, e.g. Aggrey beads from Ghana.
- For gaming, e.g. oware beads for mancala.
- As a calculation aid, threaded on an abacus.

== History ==
Beads are thought to be one of the earliest forms of trade between members of the human race. It is believed that bead trading was one of the reasons why humans developed language. Beads are said to have been used and traded for most of human history. The oldest beads were found in Blombos Cave, South Africa (about 75000 years old), and Ksar Akil, Lebanon (about 45000 years old).

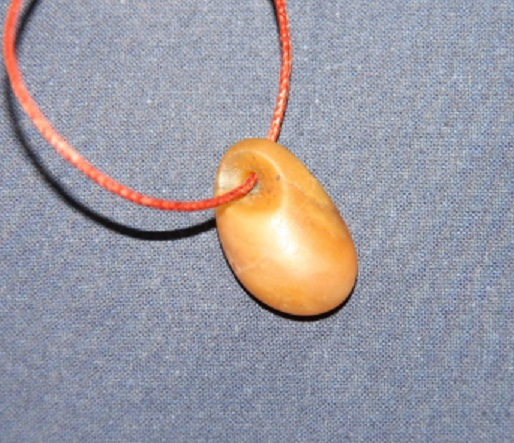
Antique Celtic pearl, Gallic, stone

== Surface patterns ==
After shaping, glass and crystal beads can have their surface appearance enhanced by etching a translucent frosted layer, applying an additional color layer, or both. Aurora Borealis, or AB, is a surface coating that diffuses light into a rainbow. Other surface coatings are vitrail, moonlight, dorado, satin, star shine, and heliotrope.

- Faux beads are beads that are made to look like a more expensive original material, especially in the case of fake pearls and simulated rocks, minerals and gemstones. Precious metals and ivory are also imitated.

Tagua nuts from South America are used as an ivory substitute since the natural ivory trade has been restricted worldwide.

== Magnetic beads ==
Selecting magnetic materials are considered useful for medical care and medical research. By linking monoclonal antibodies or DNA to magnetic beads, or by using magnetic beads coated with streptavidin, a specific interaction with the corresponding target is ensured. By means of an external magnet, the recovery of material for further studies is greatly simplified.

== See also ==
- Fly tying#Bead (Spherical brass, tungsten, and glass beads are often used in Fly tying)
- Glass beadmaking
- Jewelry design
- Mardi Gras beads
- Murano beads
- Pearl
- Ultraviolet-sensitive bead
