= Ultraviolet-sensitive bead =

Beads that change color in UV rays

Ultraviolet-sensitive beads (UV beads) are beads that change color in the presence of ultraviolet radiation. Ultraviolet rays are present in sunlight and light from various artificial sources and can cause sunburn or skin cancer. The beads act as a cheap, wearable sensor; the color change in the beads alerts the wearer to the presence of UV radiation.

When the beads are not exposed to ultraviolet rays, they are colorless and either translucent or opaque. However, when sunlight falls onto the beads, they instantly become red, orange, yellow, blue, purple, or pink.

UV-sensitive beads are generally made of a photochromic pigment embedded in polyethylene or polypropylene, which is then shaped to form the bead. It is also possible to make UV-sensitive beads from alginates.

== See also ==
- Photosensitive glass
- Pony beads
