= Fuse beads =

Plastic bead toy

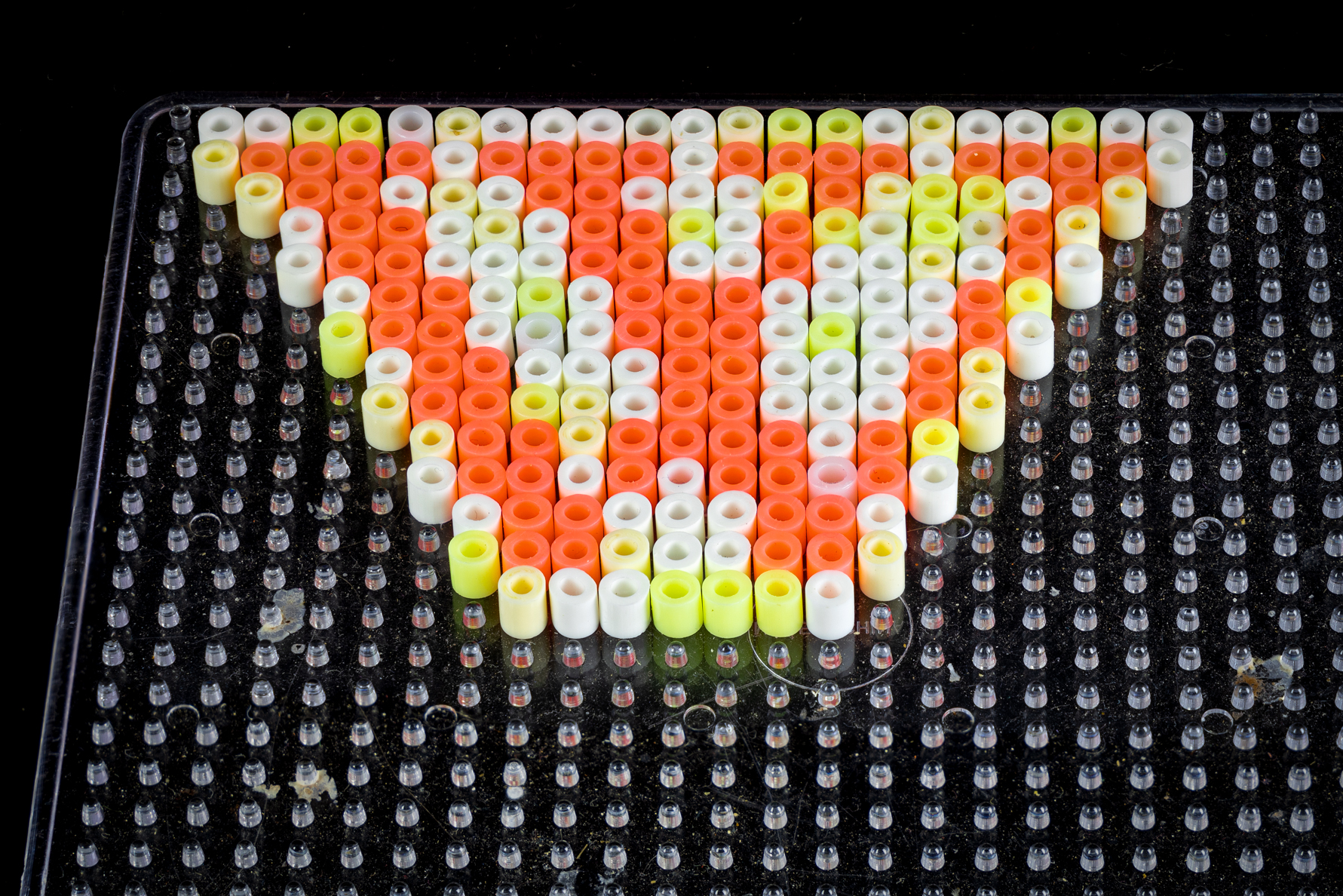
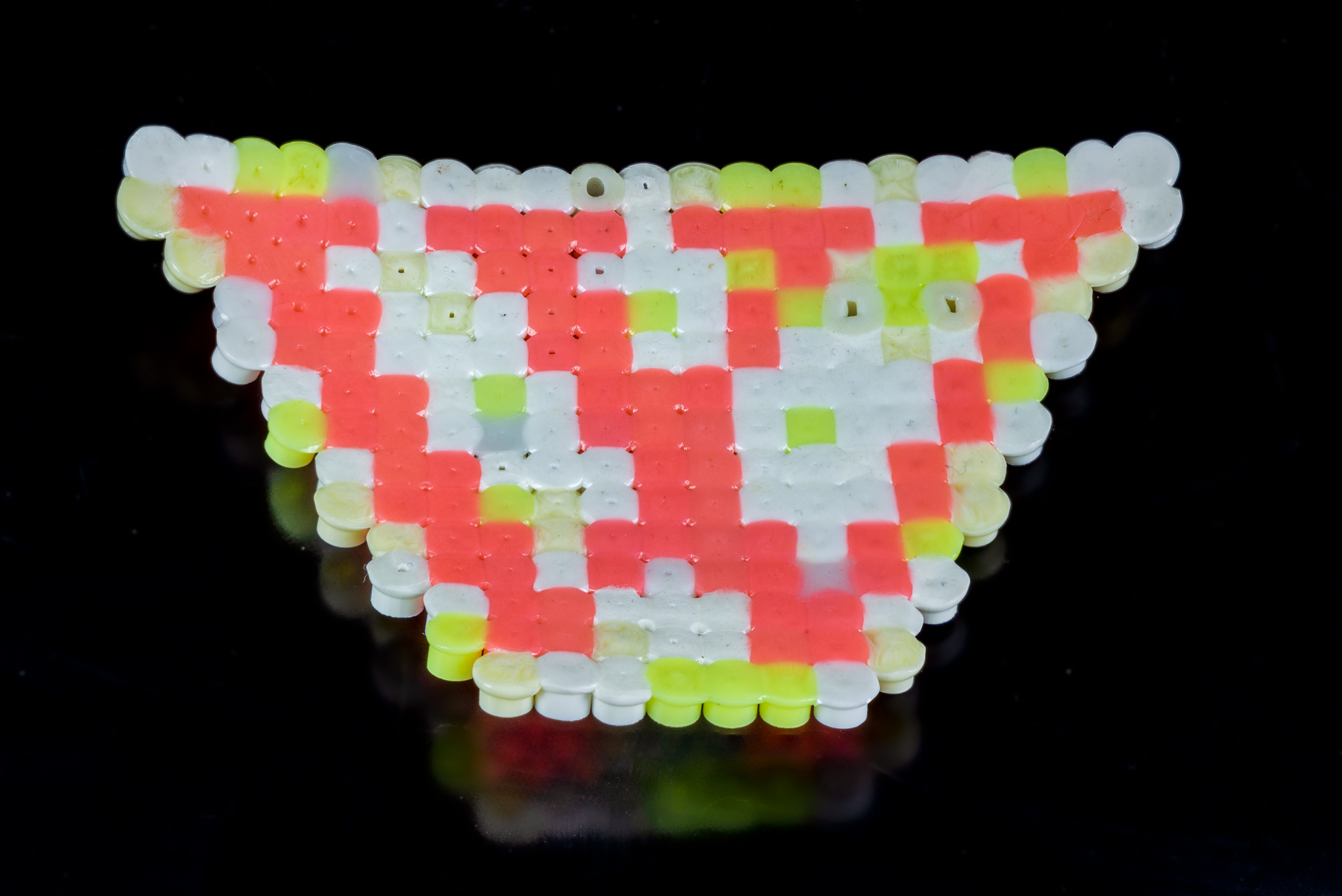
Fuse-bead pattern before and after ironing

Fuse beads, thermobeads, iron beads, or iron-fusible beads are multicoloured tubular plastic beads that can be arranged into 2D designs on a pegboard, and then fused together by the application of a hot clothes iron through parchment paper to form mosaics. Originally invented as a therapeutic device for the elderly, they were later sold as a children's toy, and have since attracted the interest of hobbyists. Common fuse-bead brands include Hamabeads, Perler Beads, and Nabbi Beads. A similar toy, aqua-dots, are spherical beads that are fused by spraying with water, rather than by the application of heat.

== Description ==
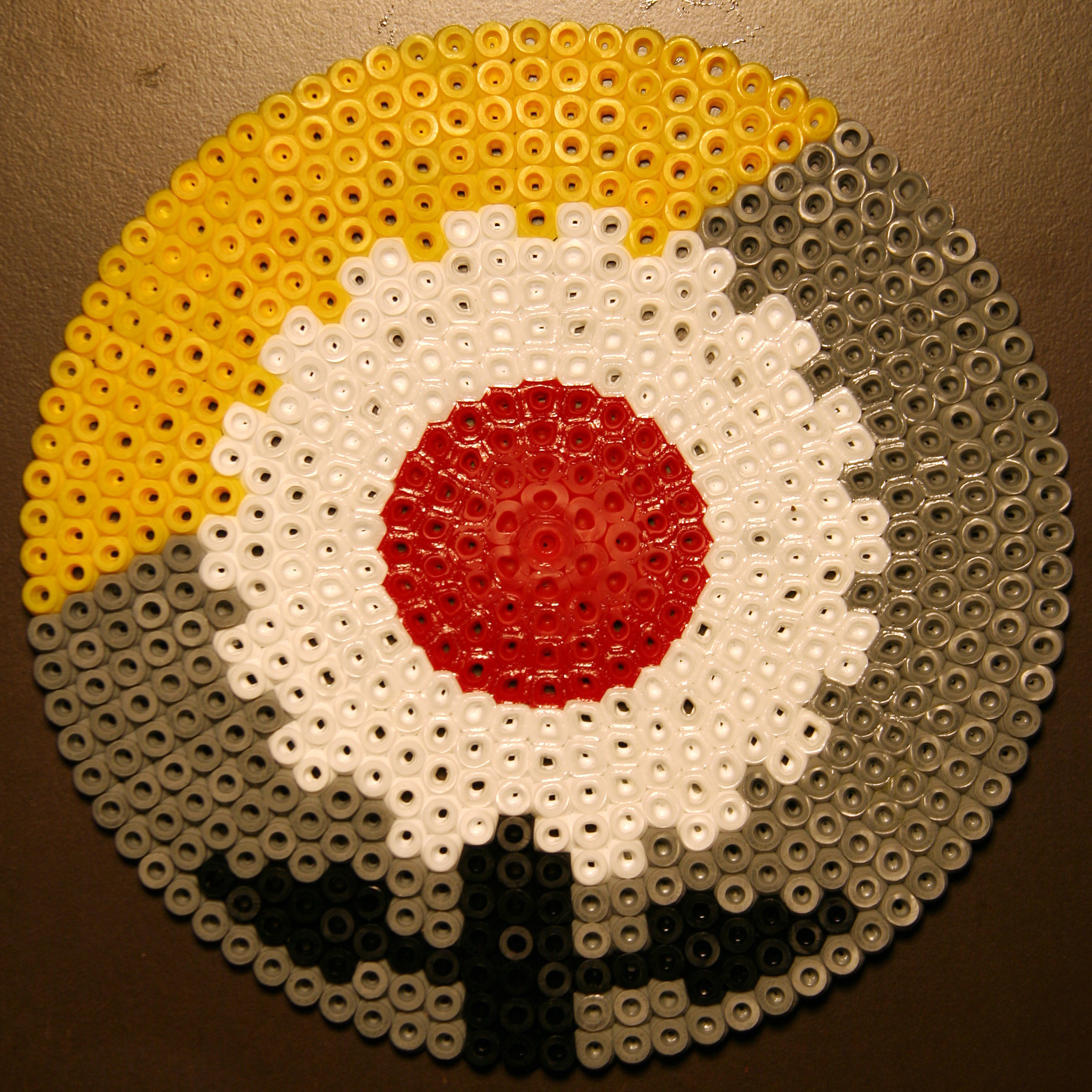
Circular pattern created on a board of pegs arranged in concentric rings.

Fuse beads are small cylindrical plastic beads that fit tightly onto an array of pegs. The arrangement of pegs on the board constrains the possible patterns that can be produced on that board. Most fuse-beading is done on a square grid pegboard, but there are other arrangements like hexagonal grids. Tweezers can be used to make bead placement easier. Square grids enable recreating pixel art. The beads are also sometimes used to create 3d "voxel" constructions.

The beads come in a variety of colours and styles, including opaque, translucent, glow-in-the-dark, and glitter beads. Beads are either sold in separate colours, or with different colours mixed together.

To fuse the beads and fix the design into place, heat must be applied. This is done by laying the pegboard with the pattern on a flat surface, adding a sheet of parchment paper and moving a dry clothes iron over the paper. Once cooled, the design is lifted from the pegboard and the ironing process may be repeated on the underside. Depending on how long the beads are ironed for, their holes may or may not close up. Unlike other kinds of beadwork, this process does not involve the use of any thread or wire. However, unfused fuse beads may also be strung into necklaces and bracelets or woven into keychains, like any other kind of bead.

Fuse beads are sold in a variety of sizes, but most have diameter 5 mm, and 5 mm Hama beads are compatible with 5 mm Perler beads. Hamabeads come in three sizes: mini (2 mm), midi (5 mm) and maxi (10 mm). Perler beads come in three sizes called mini (2.6 mm), classic (5 mm), and biggie (10 mm). Pyssla beads (by IKEA) only come in one size (5 mm).

== History ==
Diagrams from the original patent for the plastic bead pegboard

The pegboard for bead designs was invented in the early 1960s (patented 1962, patent granted 1967) by Gunnar Knutsson in Vällingby, Sweden, as a therapy for elderly homes; the pegboard later gained popularity as a toy for children. Originally, the bead designs were not fused but glued to cardboard or masonite boards and used as trivets. Later, when the beads were made of polyethylene, it became possible to fuse them with a flat iron.

HAMA began producing pegboard beads in 1971, but they only became fusible by the late 70s. Peter Schneck and Dee Dee Schneck founded the Perler brand of fuse bead in 1981 in California, and the beads gained popularity during the 1980s. During the 2000s and onwards, fuse beads gained new popularity through online communities focused on using them to recreate pixel art sprites from video games. In 2015, a 4.65 m × 8.70 m fuse-bead picture was created from 1,680,200 beads in Väringaskolan, Sweden, and hung in Stockholm Arlanda Airport.

== Gallery ==
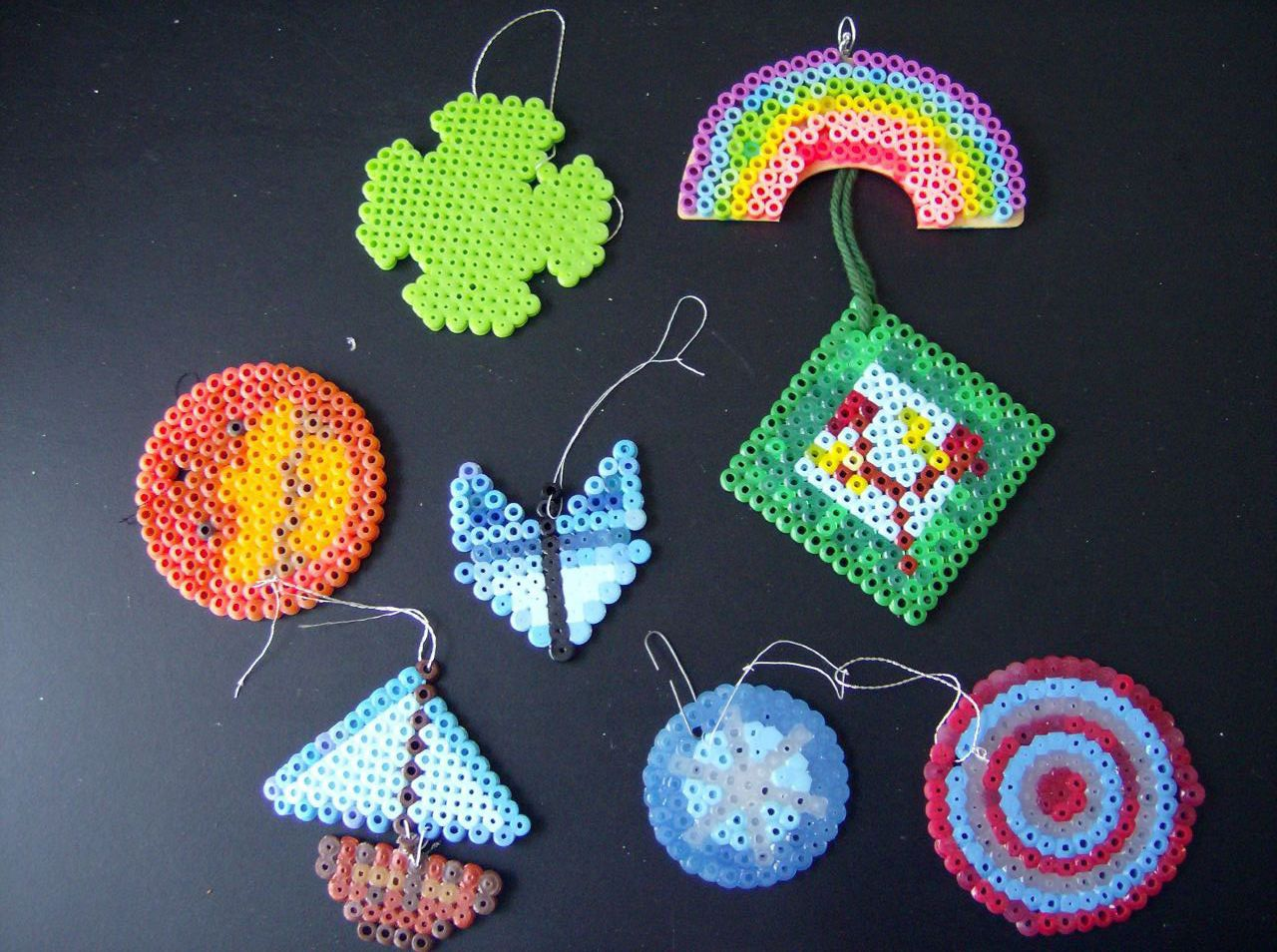
Various fuse bead designs

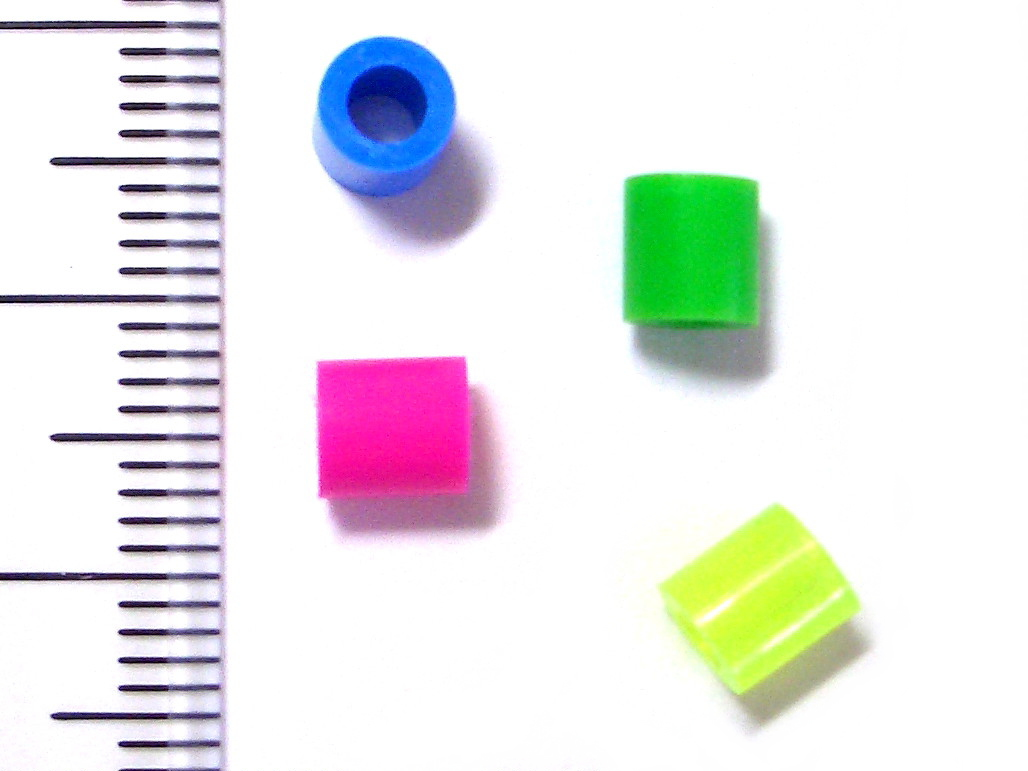
Typical fuse beads against a millimetre scale

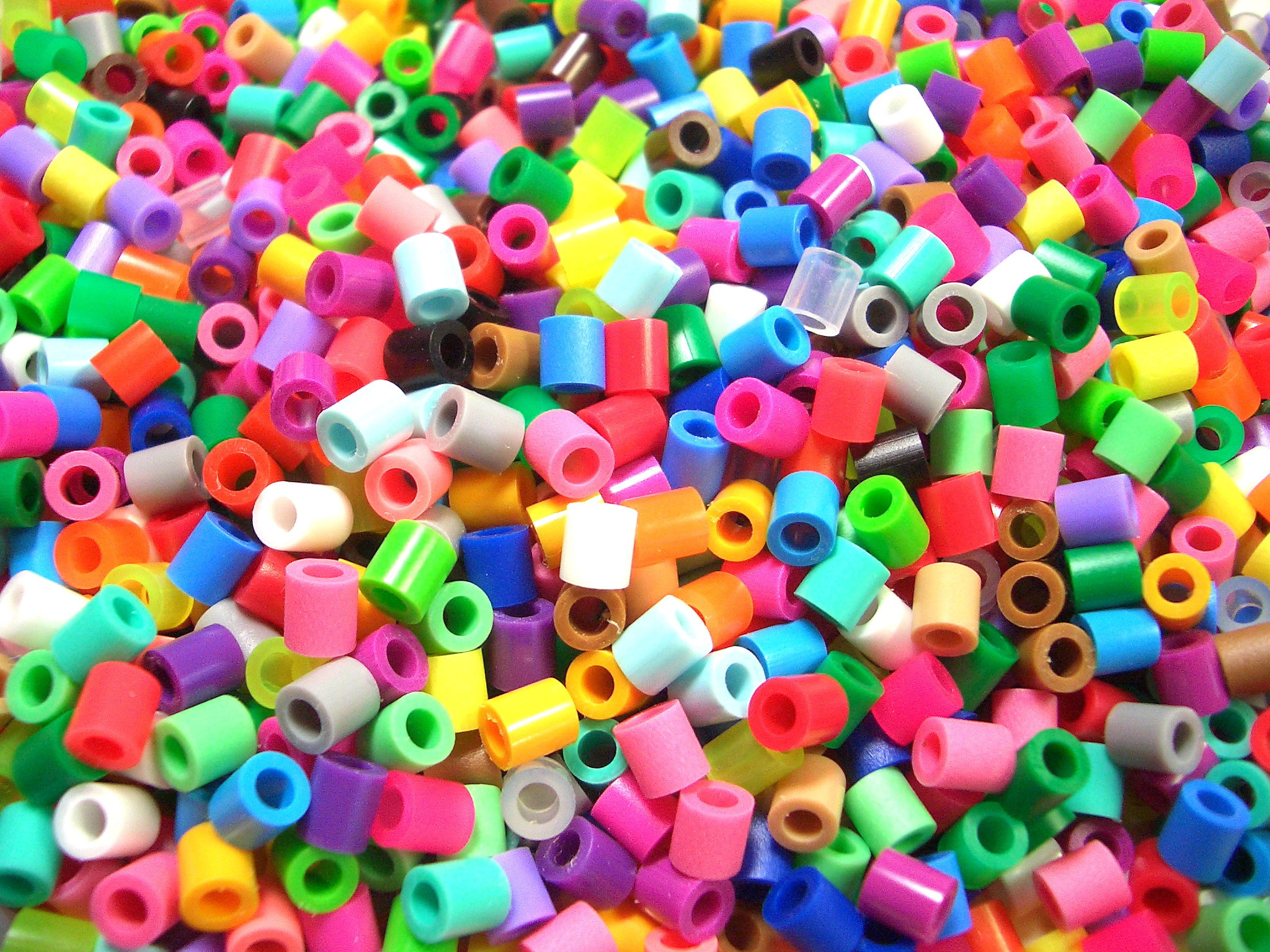
Mixture including translucent and transparent beads
