= Bindeez =

Craft toy

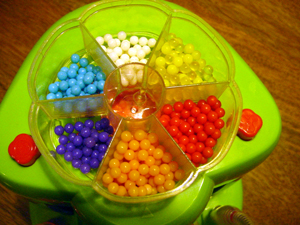
Some Bindeez ready to be used

Bindeez (also marketed as Aqua Dots, Beados, PixOs, and Aquabeads) are a children's toy, consisting of small coloured plastic beads that can be arranged in designs created by Canadian toy company Spin Master.

In 2007, Bindeez was subject to a multi-national product recall after it was found that the Wangqi Product Factory in Shenzhen, China had, in some shipped toys, used a cheap chemical that was a pharmacologically active sedative prodrug instead of the safer chemical specified by the designers, resulting in the illness and hospitalization of some children who ingested the beads. Since then, safer replacements have been marketed.

== Description ==
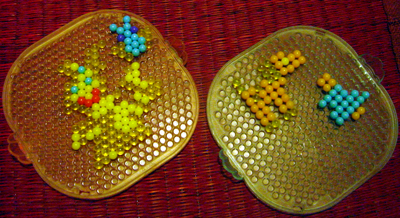
Some Bindeez designs

Bindeez contains a craft kit that allows children to create various multi-dimensional designs using small colored beads. "Bindeez" can refer to either the toy itself or the small beads. The beads are arranged into various designs on a plastic tray. When the beads are sprayed with water, their surfaces become adhesive and they fuse together. The beads are then left to dry and the whole design becomes fixed and can be removed from the tray. Unlike iron-fusible beads, they do not require heat to be fused.

The beads are approximately five millimetres in diameter and come in a wide range of colours. Bindeez are available in various different kits with accessories such as a drying fan, applicator pen, design templates for the beads, and water spray bottles. The product is labelled for ages four and above.

== 2007 recall ==
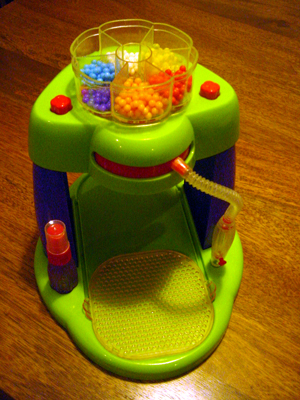
The Aqua Dots Design Studio. Part of a range of Bindeez products

Bindeez were first withdrawn from the Australian market, and subsequently from the North American market by the United States Consumer Product Safety Commission as well as European markets in early November 2007. They were recalled in Australia after a two-year-old boy and a 10-year-old girl became seriously ill after they swallowed large numbers of the beads and the connection between the illness and the product was discovered by a doctor at The Children's Hospital at Westmead, Sydney. Two children in North America became unconscious after similar ingestion. U.S. safety officials recalled about 4.2 million of the toys.

The Aqua Dots recall is one of the most serious announced by CPSC in recent years. When we first announced the recall on Wednesday, we knew of two children who had fallen into non-responsive comas after ingesting the beads used with this arts and crafts toy. Since the recall was announced, we have learned of seven additional incidents, some involving children who had to be hospitalized (this is now being reported on the AP wire). We urge all parents and caregivers who have this recalled toy to immediately take it away from children and ensure that no one else takes possession of it.

— Scott Wolfson, Deputy Director, Consumer Product Safety Commission, 9 November 2007.,

The toy was supposed to contain the non-toxic plasticiser 1,5-pentanediol, but instead contained toxic 1,4-butanediol, which is metabolised into the sedative-hypnotic drug gamma-hydroxybutyric acid. At the time the substitution was discovered, the non-toxic ingredient was three to seven times more expensive than the toxic one. The affected children had seizure-like activity, which is an occasional side-effect of severe GHB overdose. Concern has been raised in the press that people may intentionally eat the beads in order to get high, potentially spawning a black market in the recalled toy.

The Australian distributor has claimed that the medical emergencies "did not result in any long-term effects."

The issue was the topic of the second episode of the third season of Elementary, a Sherlock Holmes remake that aired on 6 November 2014. The episode was entitled "The Five Orange Pipz". The murderer was attempting to market the beads after they would be released from evidence.

A similar Japanese product, Aquabeads, which was developed in Japan by Epoch Co., and is produced by a different Chinese manufacturer, has not been recalled and is uncontaminated.

In Australia, replacement beads were available from March 2008 onwards, based on the interim ban being lifted. The replacement beads will be manufactured using only approved ingredients. To discourage ingestion, the replacement beads will also be coated with the bitter-tasting substance known as Bitrex. The name of the product was also changed from Bindeez to Beados in an attempt to extinguish the link between the recall of the old toy and the new toy.

In North America, the beads, previously marketed as "Aquadots", were remarketed as Pixos and marketed as "Safety Tested" in the television commercial as the commercial began hitting the airways in early July. However, the background music is exactly the same. In June 2009, "Chixos" featuring dolls began marketing more towards girls.

== Awards ==
Bindeez was awarded Australian "Toy of the Year" for 2007 prior to the recall. Toy Wishes magazine named it as one of the products among its 12 best toys of 2007. It is manufactured in China for the Australian-owned company Moose Enterprise P/L, and distributed in North America by Spin Master Ltd. It is distributed in 40 countries, and 12 million packets, containing more than 8 billion beads, have been sold worldwide.

== See also ==
- 2007 Chinese export recalls
- Toy safety
