= Pixel art =

Form of digital art

Portrait of a cat made in a 64x64 pixel art canvas. Includes a zoomed-in window in the bottom left corner to enhance the details of the cat's face. See complete image

Pixel art (Note: The term was originally coined in the form 'pixel art' (spaced) in a journal letter by Adele Goldberg and Robert Flegal (main section: § Origin). However, as time has passed the following alternative spellings have also been used to refer to the same medium: "Pixel-art"; "Pixelart" (compound); "Art of pixels" in some languages, like French.) is a form of digital art drawn with graphical software where images are built using pixels as the only building block. It is widely associated with the low-resolution graphics from 8-bit and 16-bit era computers, arcade machines and video game consoles, in addition to other limited systems such as LED displays and graphing calculators, which have a limited number of pixels and colors available. The art form is still employed to this day by pixel artists and game studios, even though the technological limitations have since been surpassed.

Most works of pixel art are also restrictive both in file size and the number of colors used in their color palette for reasons such as software limitations, to achieve a certain aesthetic, or to reduce the perceived noise. Older forms of pixel art tend to employ smaller palettes, with some video games being made using just two colors (1-bit color depth). Because of these self-imposed limitations, pixel art presents strong similarities with many traditional restrictive art forms such as mosaics, cross-stitch, and fuse beads.

There is no precise classification for pixel art, but an artwork is usually considered as such if deliberate thought was put into each individual pixel of the image. Standard digital artworks or low-resolution photographs are also composed of pixels, but they would only be considered pixel art if the individual pixels were placed with artistic intent, even if the pixels are clearly visible or prominent.

The phrases "dot art" and "pixel pushing" are sometimes used as synonyms for pixel art, particularly by Japanese artists. The term spriting sometimes refers to the activity of making pixel art elements for video games specifically. The concept most likely originated from the word sprite, which is used in computer graphics to describe a two-dimensional bitmap that can be used as a building block in the construction of larger scenes.

== Definition ==
Approximations of continuous color gradients are possible in pixel art despite the focus on the visibility of individual pixels.

Pixel art is commonly differentiated from other digital imagery when the appearance of individual pixels plays an important role in the composition of the artwork, usually requiring deliberate control over the placement of each individual pixel. When purposefully editing in this way, changing the position of a few pixels can have a large effect on the image.

A common characteristic in pixel art is the low overall color count in the image. Pixel art as a medium mimics a lot of traits found in older video game graphics, rendered by machines capable of only outputting a limited number of colors at once.

As images get higher in resolution, pixels get harder to distinguish from each other, and the importance of their careful placement is diminished. The exact point at which this occurs and the conditions change to where a piece cannot be reasonably called "pixel art" is subjective.

== History ==
=== Origin ===
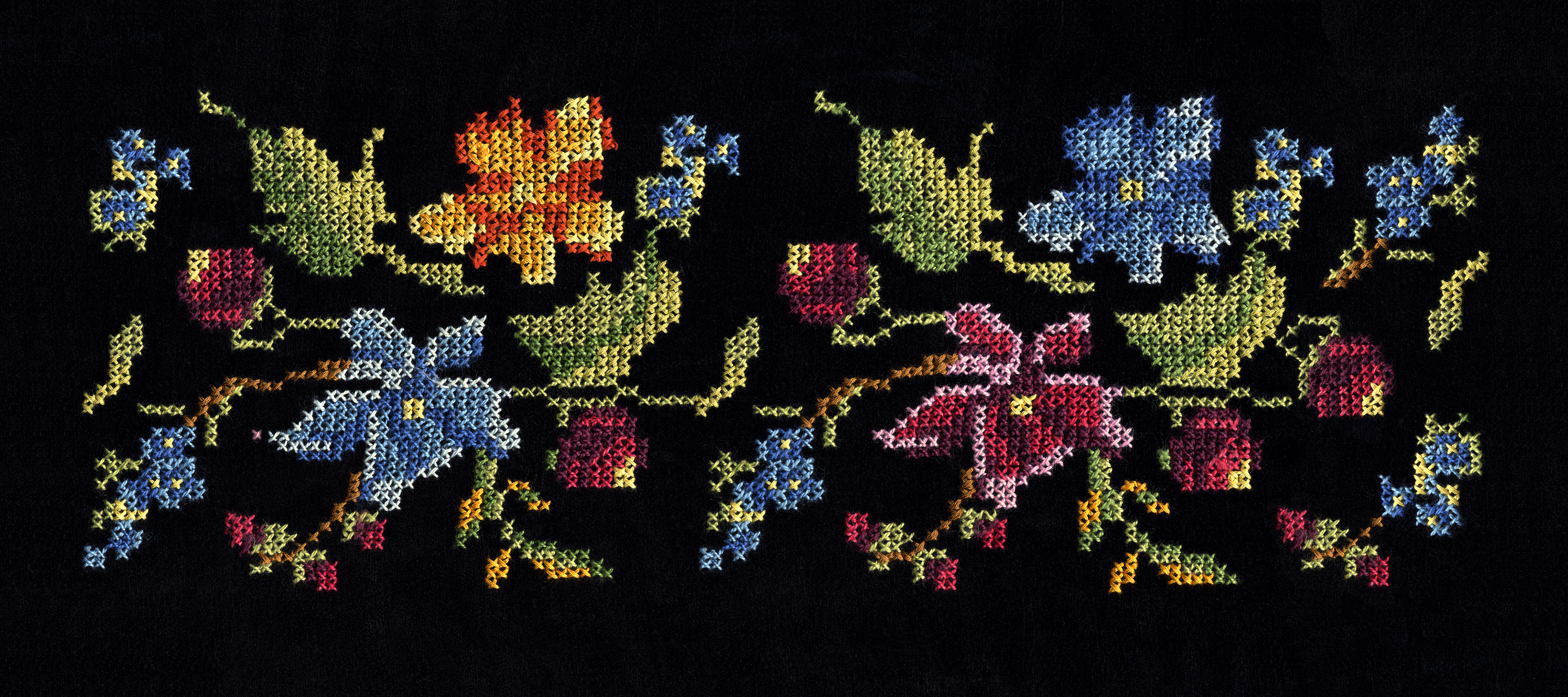
Traditional cross-stitch embroidery

Some traditional art forms, like counted-thread embroidery (including cross-stitch) and some kinds of mosaic and beadwork, are very similar to pixel art and could be considered as non-digital counterparts or predecessors. These art forms construct pictures out of small colored units similar to the pixels of modern digital computing.

Some of the earliest examples of pixel art could be found in analog electronic advertising displays, such as the ones from New York City during the early 20th century, with simple monochromatic light bulb matrix displays extant circa 1937. Pixel art as it is known today largely originates from the golden age of arcade video games, with games such as Space Invaders (1978) and Pac-Man (1980), and 8-bit consoles such as the Nintendo Entertainment System (1983) and Master System (1985).

The term pixel art was first published in a journal letter by Adele Goldberg and Robert Flegal of Xerox Palo Alto Research Center in 1982. The practice, however, goes back at least 11 years before that, for example in Richard Shoup's SuperPaint system in 1972, also at Xerox PARC.

=== 1970s ===
Because of the severe restrictions of early graphics, the first instances of pixel art in video games were relatively abstract. The low resolution of computers and game consoles forced game designers to carefully design game assets by deliberate placement of individual pixels, to form recognizable symbols, characters, or items. Simple function-based avatars (or player-surrogates) such as spaceships, cars, or tanks required a minimum of animation and computing power, while enemies, terrain, and power-ups were often represented by symbols or simple designs. Due to the limited hardware of the 1970s, abstraction, as in the case of Pong's relatively simple design, sometimes led to better game readability and commercial success than attempting more detailed representational art.

Although computers had been used to create art since the 1960s and microcomputers were used in the late 1970s and there are examples of digital art utilizing a more pixelated aesthetic, there is no well-known tradition of pixel art from the 1970s that differentiated between the deliberate placement of pixels or the aestheticization of individual pixels in contrast to other forms of digital painting or digital art. For this reason, one could argue that pixel art was not a recognized medium or artform in the 1970s.

=== 1980s ===
Bubble Ghost (1987) on Atari ST

In what is sometimes referred to as the golden age of video games or golden age of arcade video games, the 1980s saw a period of innovation in video games, both as a new artform and a form of entertainment. During the early 1980s, video game creators were mainly programmers and not graphic designers. Technological innovation led to market pressure for more representational and "realistic" graphics in games. As graphics improved, it became possible to replace hand-drawn game assets with imported pictures or 3D polygons, which contributed to pixel art developing as a separate art form.

Gradually, professional artists and graphic designers had a bigger impact in the video game industry. Sierra Entertainment released Mystery House, pixelled by Roberta Williams, and the King's Quest series; and Lucasfilm Games released games such as Maniac Mansion, Zak McKracken and the Alien Mindbenders, and Indiana Jones and the Last Crusade: The Graphic Adventure. Mark J. Ferrari, an artist at Lucasfilm Games, later said:

When I was first hired by Lucasfilm Games in 1987 to do artwork for their computer games, pixel graphics was not thought of by anyone as an 'art form'. The use of pixels was not an aesthetic choice – as it certainly is now. If anything, pixels were an unavoidable and very irksome obstacle to the creation of any 'real art' for use in the exciting but bewildering new realm of computer entertainment. There were no pixel artists then – at all! There were only traditional artists.

Nevertheless, the aesthetic of 1980s video games had a major impact on contemporary and future pixel art, both in video games, the demoscene graphics and among independent artists. As computers became more affordable in the 1980s, software such as DEGAS Elite (1986) for the Atari ST, Deluxe Paint (1985) and Deluxe Paint 2 (1986) for the Commodore Amiga, and Paint Magic for the Commodore 64, inspired many later pixel artists to create digital art by careful placement of pixels. In the case of the Commodore 64 and the Amstrad CPC, some early pixel artists used joysticks and keyboards to pixel.

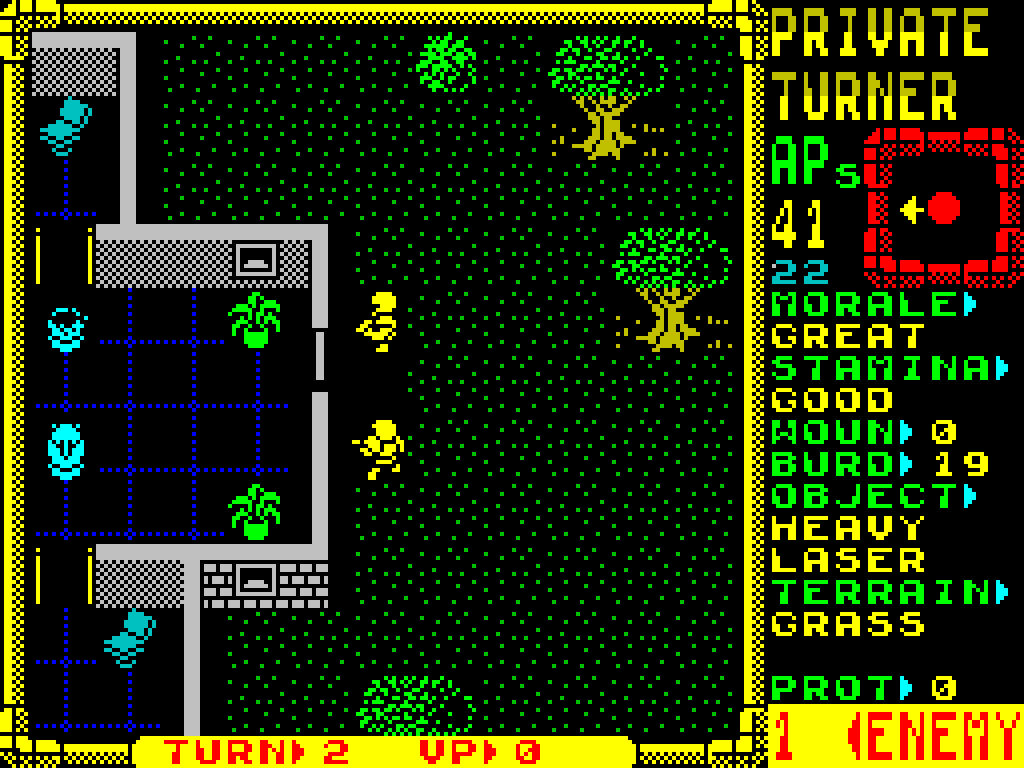
Laser Squad (1988) screenshot, ZX Spectrum

With the rise of the demoscene movement in Europe in the late 1980s, artists who were proficient with creating pixel art using 8-bit computers like the Commodore 64 and ZX Spectrum or 16-bit computers like the Atari ST began to publish their pixel art as demos. Demogroups would often include coders (programmers), musicians, and graphicians, where graphicians were a common name for graphic designers and/or pixel artists. Although some graphicians worked on adding art to cracked video games (cracktros), the demoscene contributed to artistic communities creating pixel art for its own sake as art. These were often shared via floppy disks that were handed from person to person or via the postal service. The golden age of the demoscene and its associated pixel art milieu, however, is often regarded as beginning in the early 1990s.

=== 1990s ===
The Chaos Engine (1993) on Amiga

Before the 1990s, display systems were mostly based on a small 4-bit palette of imposed colors (16 fixed shades innate to each system, often incompatible with one another). The coming decade greatly improved the graphics standard with the appearance of increased color depth and indexed color palettes (For example, 512 colors for the Atari ST and the Mega Drive, 4,096 for the Amiga ECS, 32,768 for the Super Nintendo, and 16,777,216 for the Amiga AGA and the VGA mode of the PCs). During the 1990s, 2D games with manually painted graphics saw increasing competition from 3-dimensional games and games using pre-rendered 3D assets. Still, pixel art games like Flashback, The Secret of Monkey Island, The Chaos Engine, Street Fighter III: 3rd Strike, Super Mario World, and The Legend of Zelda: A Link to the Past had a major influence on future artists in the game industry, the contemporary demoscene and the aesthetic of pixel art in later decades.

In addition to pixel art influenced by video games, pixel artists (or graphicians) in the demoscene continued to make pixel art for demos and cracktros. Some demoscene pixel artists active in the 1990s have cited movies and urban graffiti as important influences for their art, particularly in designing logos. In addition to copying sprites from existing video games, demoscene pixel artists also copied the work of popular artists and illustrators such as Ian Miller and Simon Bisley. Competition gradually became an increasingly important part of demoscene gatherings, including pixel art (graphics) competitions, and as teenagers and young adults were the major demographic in these gatherings, a lot of demoscene pixel art referenced familiar fantasy, science fiction and cyberpunk tropes. Demoscene competitions had a major effect in shaping the direction of pixel art. Prominent artists would look for ways to innovate, display superior technique, overcome technical restrictions, and in many cases aim for photorealism through anti-aliasing.

As the internet became more available in the 1990s, pixel artists and demosceners gradually began to spread their pixel art via websites, instant messaging, and online file sharing. While the demoscene was arguably most popular among young men, an online movement began in the late 1990s known as pixel dolls or 'dollz', which was popular among young women. The increased popularity of online chatting and personal webpages at a time before digital cameras were common led to an increased demand for personal representation through personalized avatars. These avatars often took the form of pixel dolls, being pixel art characters that could be outfitted with different clothing and accessories. As pixel dolls grew more and more common, many pixel artists gradually began to develop this as an independent artform.

=== 2000s ===
Advance Wars (2001) on Game Boy Advance

The 2000s were a pivotal decade for pixel art establishing itself as an artform practiced around the world, separate from other forms of digital art. In particular, the Pixelation forum and Pixel Joint gallery are credited as the most influential English-speaking online communities, connecting pixel artists all over the world in a way that the mostly Western European demoscene movement had not. Pixelation was a web forum where artists could share pixel art to give and receive feedback. Its main focus was critiquing, developing skills and understanding of pixel art, more so than simply sharing art for the sake of admiration, entertainment, or competition. Pixel Joint is an online gallery where members can submit personal work and comment on other members' pixel art. It has features such as weekly challenges, a forum, a hall of fame, and a monthly top 10-pixel art competition based on member voting.

Over time, the overlapping but separate communities of Pixelation and Pixel Joint were engaged in online discourse about the nature of pixel art, inspiring widely shared tutorials and arguably contributing to a new paradigm that was different from the pixel art of the 1990s. A major concern was to establish pixel art as its own medium and/or art form, separate from other types of digital art, such as Oekaki. In particular, highly restricted palettes (e.g. a maximum of 8 or 16 colors) were argued by some to be a defining feature of pixel art. One example is the so-called "8 color gentlemen's club", consisting of pixel artists who celebrated pixel art with 8 colors. The use of transparent layers and smudging tools was also considered non-pixel art and unacceptable for the Pixel Joint gallery. Whereas the demoscene had, to a large degree, revolved around physical gatherings and groups of artists, musicians, and programmers collaborating, pixel art communities on Pixel Joint and Pixelation were based mostly on online interaction among individual artists. On Pixel Joint, pixel art made through collaboration between artists was not accepted in the gallery but considered a separate pursuit. The relatively strict ideas of what constituted acceptable pixel art, enforced by moderators on Pixel Joint, led to repeated conflict but also contributed to pixel art standing out as a separate medium at a time when many types of digital paintings were shared on the internet, on websites like DeviantArt. In particular, several prominent artists mention Cure's tutorials as significant for learning about pixel art as a separate art medium or art form.

After the golden age of demoscene pixel art in the 1990s, many notable pixel artists of that milieu took a break from pixel art in the 2000s - although some made an early transition to join Pixelation and Pixel Joint, such as Gas 13 and Tomic. While activity did decline, the demoscene continued to explore pixel art on platforms from the late 1980s and early 1990s, particularly using the Commodore 64 and Atari computers.

Pixel doll communities grew rapidly during the 2000s, in large part due to the continued growth of forums, message boards, and chat services. With websites like the Doll Palace, Eden Enchanted, DeviantArt, and many personal websites, pixel dolls were increasingly recognized as a new art form, with public feedback, competition, tutorials, best practices, and rules of conduct. The 2000s were arguably the height of pixel doll popularity, in part because of various online communities that made use of pixel dolls for avatars and the popularity of internet forums in an age before social media. Despite this, there was relatively little interaction between the pixel doll communities and other pixel art communities such as Pixel Joint, Pixelation, or the demoscene.

In video games for computers and consoles during the 2000s, pixel art was largely abandoned in favor of more modern graphics, particularly based on 3D. Many professional game artists who had been working with pixel art either left the industry or switched to other forms of digital art. This arguably contributed to pixel art establishing itself as an independent art form, practiced mostly by independent artists rather than game industry employees. There are a few notable exceptions, such as Habbo Hotel, which inspired a great amount of isometric pixel art, and Advance Wars, for Game Boy Advance.

=== 2010s ===
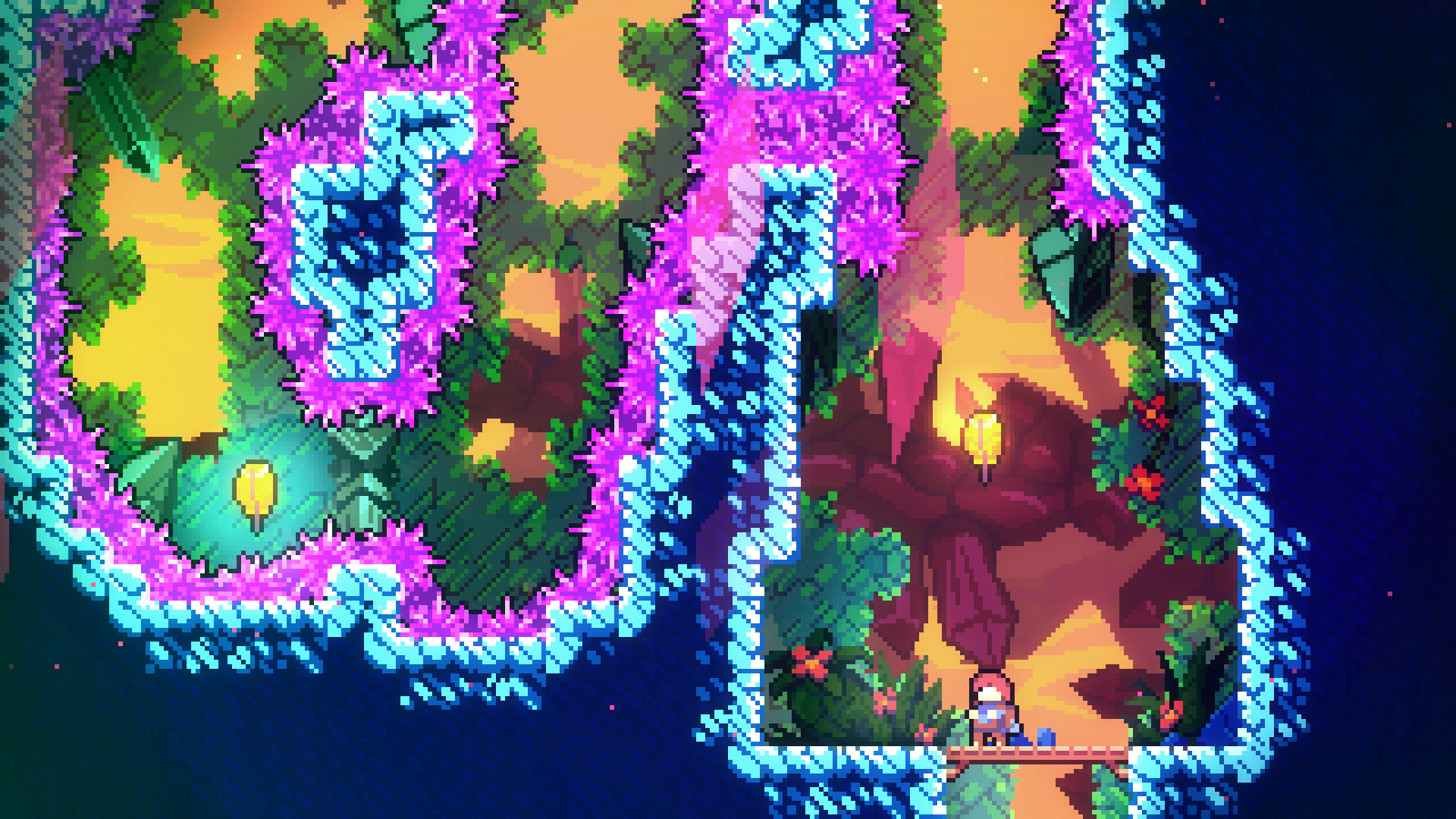
Celeste (2018)

The popularity of pixel art accelerated during the 2010s. One major contribution to this trend was the success of several 'retro' pixel art games such as Superbrothers: Sword & Sworcery EP (2011), Terraria (2011), Fez (2012), Papers, Please (2013), Shovel Knight (2014), Undertale (2015), Owlboy (2016), Stardew Valley (2016), Deltarune (2018+), Celeste (2018), and Octopath Traveler (2018). Many of these games combined low-resolution game assets with non-pixel art (NPA) elements such as filters, high definition UI, or special effects. The increased attention on pixel art in media and the game industry coincided with the rapid growth of pixel art communities. Owlboy's art director, Simon Andersen, explained that he wanted to show the advantages of the pixel as an art medium, pushing the potential of the artistic technique and showcase pixel art done properly, without millions of colors or 3D captures.

Pixel Joint and Pixelation remained important communities with a growing number of contributors, but the 2010s saw the rise of new communities on Reddit, DeviantArt, Instagram, and Twitter. While Pixelation, in particular, had a core of very dedicated, often professional, pixel artists and Pixel Joint had moderators who accepted or rejected submissions to its online gallery, new pixel art communities in social media were naturally less cohesive, yet more open. Not only did social media contribute significantly to the continued growth of pixel art, and more traffic to older pixel art websites, but websites like Tumblr, Twitter, and Instagram also gave significant global attention to new pixel artists outside of the traditional pixel art communities, such as Waneella and Pixel Jeff.

During the 2010s, the demoscene arguably entered a silver age, as several older artists returned to their hobbies after a hiatus. In addition, the increasing popularity of pixel art in this decade also attracted new artists to the demoscene, who had not been active during the 1990s and 2000s. The demoscene and its graphics competitions never stopped, but the 2010s could nevertheless be considered a period of rejuvenation.

As advanced digital painting software like Photoshop became more widely available and easier to use, the pixel doll community split into a group of artists using traditional pixel art, known as pixel-shaders, and a group of artists using more advanced tools, known as tool-shaders. As internet forums lost popularity and drawn avatars were increasingly replaced by photos in internet communities, the pixel dolling community gradually became less active in this decade.

Perhaps because of the rise of pixel art in video games and social media, pixel art was also seen in other areas of popular culture and even made its way to public museums. Ivan Dixon and Paul Robertson received international attention for making a pixel art version of The Simpsons' introduction sequence. Eboy became well known for their isometric pixel art displays, often used for advertisement or sold as independent art. The work of pixel artists such as Octavi Navarro and Gustavo Viselner was featured in major newspapers and magazines. French urban artist Invader received international attention for his urban pixel art mosaics, seen around the world. Among 1980s-inspired synthwave artists and groups, pixel art was used to make music videos, such as Valenberg's work for Perturbator and a Gunship music video by pixel artists Jason Tammemagi, Gyhyom, Mary Safro, and Waneella. In 2012, the Smithsonian Institution museum of Washington created an exhibition called The Art of Video Games, attended by almost 700,000 people.

=== 2020s ===
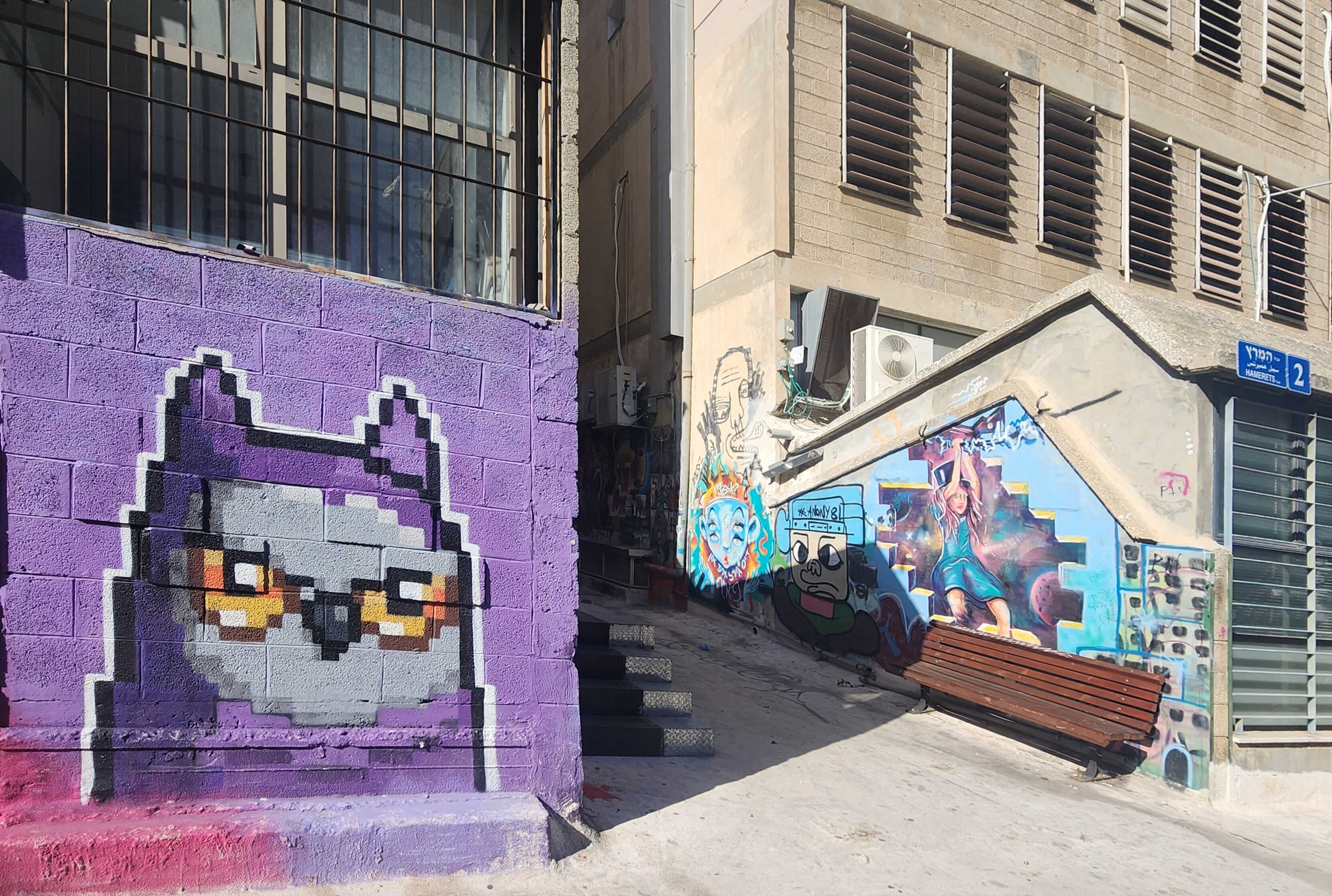
Pixel art is at times imitated in the physical world, for example in this graffiti art in Tel Aviv. Picture taken in 2023.

Although some commenters had predicted the decline of "retro" pixel art after a wave of pixel art games in the 2010s, pixel art has continued to remain popular in the current decade. One major contributing factor seems to have been the COVID-19 pandemic, as people around the world spent more time online, playing games, using social media and developing new hobbies. A second contributing factor seems to have been the rise of NFTs, as pixel art became an inexpensive way to produce large numbers of artworks. As the market for NFTs grew rapidly, many pixel artists embraced the new technology as a new source of income. Many notable professional artists also expressed skepticism and disapproval of NFTs, citing environmental factors, pyramid scheme claims, and money laundering as reasons for rejecting offers. One of the most profiled examples of pixel artists expressing opposition to NFTs is Castpixel, citing environmental effects and artificial scarcity. Furthermore, as is the case with other forms of digital art, pixel artists have also discovered many cases of plagiarism and fraud by actors who download pixel art without permission to sell as NFTs. Although the discussion around pixel art theft is not new, the issue has certainly become more controversial with the rise of NFTs.

Perhaps linked to the increased influence and attraction of social media platforms like Twitter, Mastodon, Reddit, and Instagram, older pixel art communities on Pixelation and DeviantArt declined in the 2020s. Discord became an important platform for pixel art communities like Pixel Joint, PAD (Pixel Art Discord), Lospec, and Trigonomicon. In the early fall of 2022, Pixelation announced the closing of its webforum and a transition to Twitter.

Pixel art continued to be a popular style in games across platforms, with releases such as Eastward (2021), Loop Hero (2021), Vampire Survivors (2022), Pizza Tower (2023), Blasphemous 2 (2023), Dave the Diver (2023), Balatro (2024) and Antonblast (2024). Some argued that the recent wave of pixel art games, released thirty years after the release of the SNES, was largely influenced by nostalgia and freedom from publishers, responding to unoriginal stories in modern video game blockbusters and wanting to integrate contemporary themes, such as ecological concerns and representation of queer characters.

== Techniques ==
Both of these illustrations are made of pixels, as they are raster digital images. In the image on the left, however, the individual squares that make up the character are large enough to be easily distinguished with the naked eye, which is characteristic of the pixel art style. The image on the left also has considerably fewer colors, which is also typical of pixel art.

Pixel art typically involves more careful and deliberate placement of pixels compared to other forms of digital art. Artists use different brush sizes (e.g. 1x1 or 2x2 pixels) and a variety of tools, such as free-hand/pencil, lines, and rectangles. One key difference between pixel art and other digital art is that pixel artists tend to apply a single color at a time, avoiding tools such as soft edges, smudging, and blurring. Agreeing on which tools and techniques are considered non-pixel art (NPA) is something that has caused considerable disagreement in the past. For example, applying layers with different filters that adjust hue or light values is considered a non-pixel art technique, but the resulting art may still be considered pixel art if there's a clear foundation of deliberate placement of pixels. To preserve the careful pixel placement, pixel art is preferably stored in a file format utilizing lossless data compression. The JPEG format, for example, is often avoided because of its compression, as it introduces visible artifacts in the image.

Different restrictions are central to pixel art, and these are often traced back to technical limitations of hardware such as Amiga, Commodore 64, NES, and early computers. The two most common restrictions are resolution and palette, and pixel artists often work with a significantly reduced canvas size and number of colors compared to other digital artists. Examples include Commodore 64 restrictions (320x200 resolution, 16 colors), original ZX Spectrum restrictions (256x192 pixels, 15 colors), and GameBoy restrictions (160x144 pixels, 4 colors).

Some artists start the process of pixelling by drawing line art, while others begin by blocking in simple shapes and big clusters. Traditionally, pixel art was done on a single layer, similar to painting on a canvas, but modern software permits work with multiple layers, potentially adding animation or transparency to the foreground while keeping a static background.

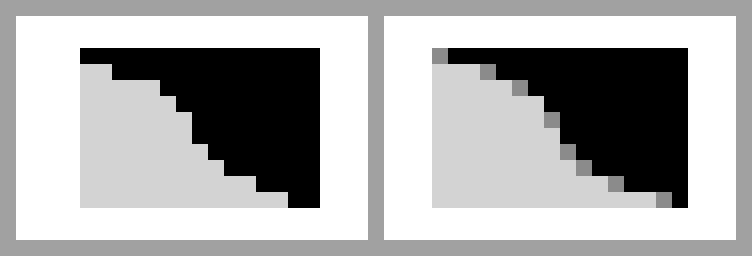
Without (left) and with (right) anti-aliasing

To deal with the various restrictions of pixel art, such as reduced resolution or colors, pixel artists have traditionally employed several techniques specific to the art form. One widely used technique is dithering, commonly using noise or a repeating pattern such as a checkerboard or lines to create a third color when seen from a distance. Other common techniques include anti-aliasing (AA) where strong edges are softened by manually placing pixels, and sub-pixelling, changing the colors of pixels to create an illusion of movement.

=== Styles ===
Because pixel art is a flexible medium, pixel artists can often imitate styles from traditional media, such as impressionism or pointillism in oil painting or cross-hatching in embroidery. Pixel art is not a style itself, but a broad artistic medium. However, there are different styles within pixel art that revolve around pixel placement. One common distinction in style is the use of clusters. A cluster is a field of connected pixels with the same color. The opposite of a cluster is an isolated pixel (1x1) surrounded by pixels of other colors. Cluster size has become an important marker of pixel art styles, where some pixel art uses large clusters and avoids isolated (orphan) pixels, whereas other works use clusters of all sizes in combination with isolated pixels, or even rely primarily on isolated pixels and small clusters for a more grainy, noisy texture. Styles that rely more on small clusters and isolated pixels often have similarities with pointillism and impressionism, whereas pixel art with larger clusters and geometric shapes has similarities with cubism and suprematism. Although some artists have been known for championing a particular style, many pixel artists alternate between different styles in their works.

=== Genres and subjects ===
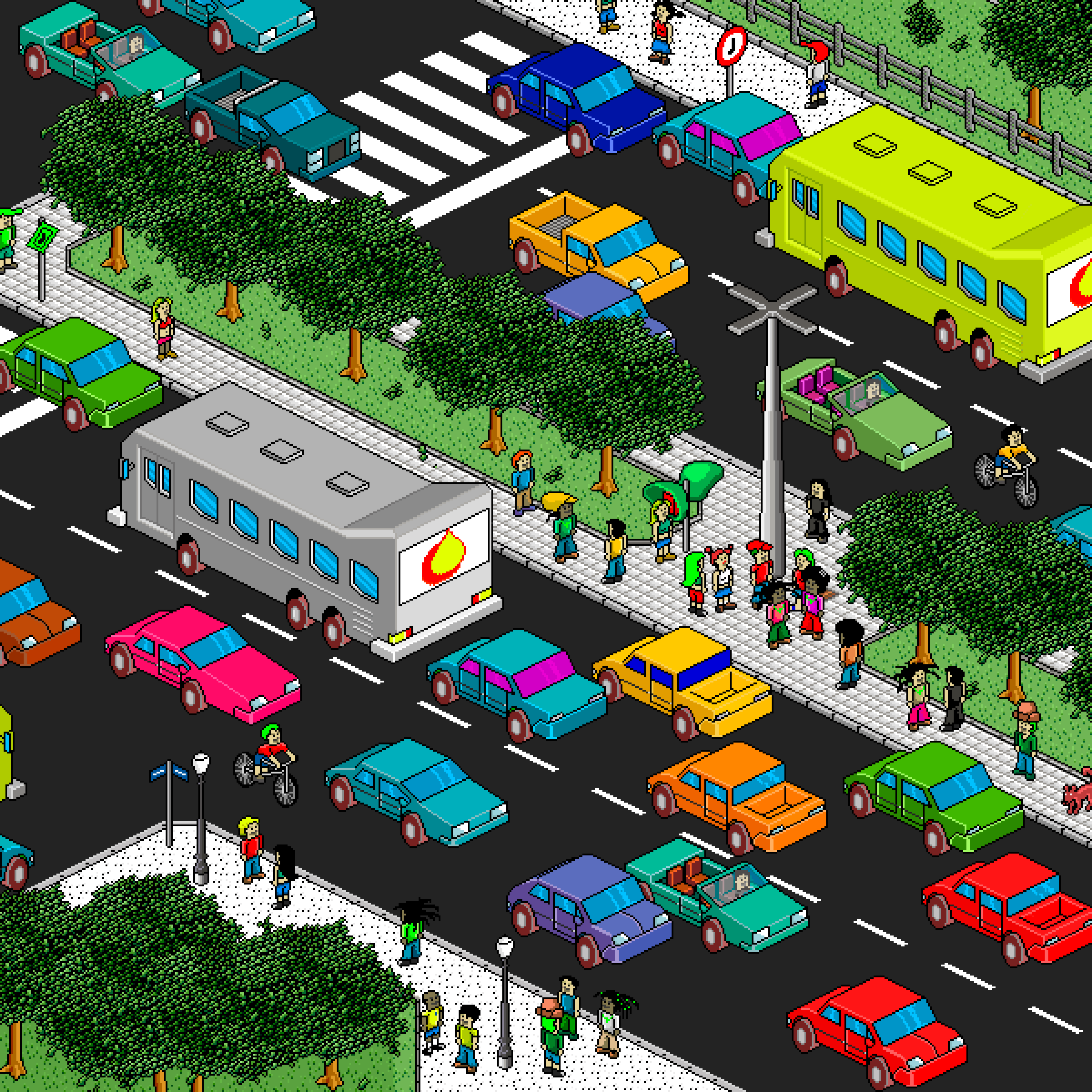
Isometric pixel art

1-bit pixel art combining sprites with text ("If it is to be, it is up to me!")

Pixel art is a flexible medium and shares traditions of figure drawing, landscapes, and abstract with traditional media. However, certain genres have emerged as particularly popular. These genres often overlap, but include:

- Isometric: Pixel art drawn in a near-isometric dimetric projection. Originally used in games to provide a three-dimensional view without using any real three-dimensional processing. Normally drawn with a 1:2 pixel ratio along the X and Y-axis.
- Sprites: Characters and game assets typically drawn in the fashion of platformer games and fighting games such as Streets of Rage or Street Fighter II or JRPGs (Japanese role-playing games) such as Final Fantasy.
- Pixel dolls: Also known as dollz. Sets of pixel art characters, usually with customizable appearance and sets of clothing. Often used as avatars for chatting and forums, or in dress-up games.
- Mock-ups: Concepts for non-existing pixel art games, including a user interface and other game elements. Retro-style mock-ups based on modern games are called 'demakes'.

=== Differences from Oekaki ===
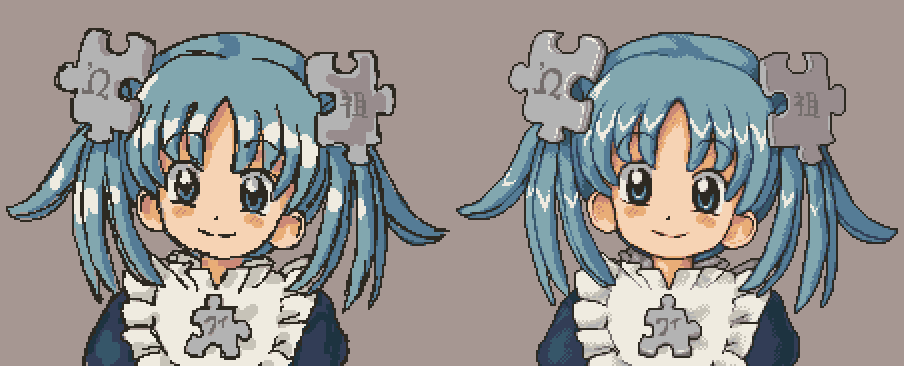
A comparison between oekaki style (left) and pixel art (right)

Oekaki is a form of digital art done at small resolutions that present many similarities with pixel art. However, in Oekaki, the placement of individual pixels is not considered as important compared to the general feel of the artwork, giving it a characteristic "messy" or jagged look.

== Software ==
Essentially all raster graphics editors can be used in some way for pixel art, some of which include features designed to make the process easier. See Comparison of raster graphics editors for a list of notable raster graphics editors. The following notable programs were designed specifically to facilitate drawing pixel art.

Relevant software whose primary function is the creation of pixel art graphics
| Software | Description | License | Financial cost | Supported platforms |
|---|---|---|---|---|
| Aseprite | Aseprite features numerous tools for image and animation editing such as layers, frames, tilemaps, command-line interface, Lua scripting, among others. An open-source fork called Libresprite was created before Aseprite became proprietary, which has become a popular free alternative. | Proprietary | Free source code, paid precompiled binaries. | Windows; macOS; Linux |
| Graphics Gale | Graphics Gale is a Japanese pixel art editor with animation features and a color-based transparency system which game artists extensively used during its early years. It was written in 2005, made freeware in 2017, and last updated in 2018. | Proprietary | Free | Windows |
| GrafX2 | GrafX2 was released in 1996, inspired by the Amiga programs Deluxe Paint and Brilliance. Specialized in 256-color drawing, it includes a broad array of tools and effects suitable for pixel art and 2D video game graphics. | Libre | Free | AmigaOS; Android; Atari MiNT; FreeBSD; Genode; Haiku; IRIX; Linux; macOS; Windows; MorphOS; MS-DOS; Syllable Desktop |
| Pro Motion NG | Pro Motion NG is primarily geared toward drawing art for video games, with features and tools for animation, spritework, and tilesets. | Proprietary | Freemium | Windows; macOS; Linux |

== See also ==
- ASCII art
- Cel shading
- Cross-stitch
- Low poly
- Mosaic
- Oekaki
- r/place
- Wplace

== Bibliography ==
=== Books ===
- Silber, Daniel (2016). Pixel art for game developers. San Francisco, CA USA: William Pollock. ISBN 978-1-59327-886-1. Archived from the original on 2022-05-25.
- Dawe, Jennifer; Humphries, Matthew (2019). Make Your Own Pixel Art. San Francisco, CA USA: William Pollock. ISBN 978-1-59327-886-1. Archived from the original on 2022-05-25.
- Benjaminsson, Klas (2016a). The Masters Of Pixel Art Volume 1. Göteborg, Sweden: Nicepixel. ISBN 978-91-639-0485-1. Archived from the original on 2021-07-11.
- Benjaminsson, Klas (2016b). The Masters Of Pixel Art Volume 2. Göteborg, Sweden: Nicepixel. ISBN 978-91-639-0486-8. Archived from the original on 2021-05-15.
- Benjaminsson, Klas (2019). The Masters Of Pixel Art Volume 3. Göteborg, Sweden: Nicepixel. ISBN 978-91-519-3539-3. Archived from the original on 2021-06-20.
- Ekilson, Stephen J. (2012). Graphic Design: A New History (2 ed.). Göteborg, Sweden: Simon & Schuster. ISBN 978-0-300-17260-7.

=== Other relevant sources ===
- Goldberg, Adele; Flegal, Robert (December 1982). "ACM president's letter: Pixel Art". Communications of the ACM. 25 (12): 861–862. doi:10.1145/358728.358731. S2CID 5150501.
- Perry, Tekla S.; Wallich, Pau (October 1985). "Inside the PARC: the information architects". IEEE Spectrum. 22 (10): 62–76. Bibcode:1985IEEES..22j..62P. doi:10.1109/MSPEC.1985.6370844. S2CID 36397557.
