= Coinage of Side =

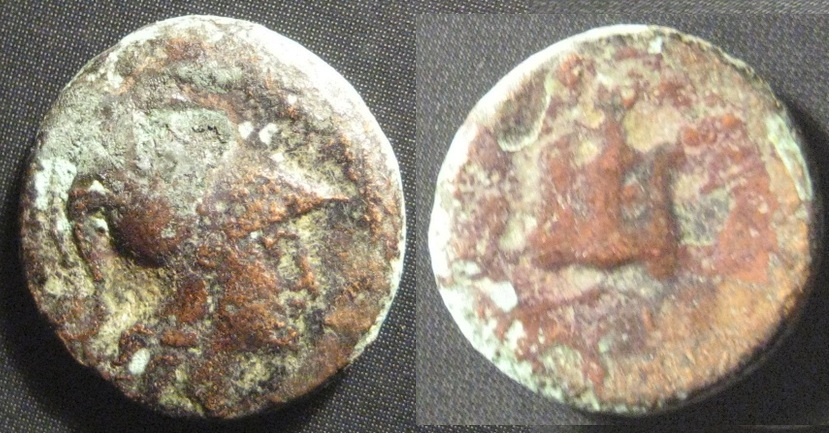
A bronze coin of Side, 350-300BC. Obverse; Cortinthian crested Helmeted bust of Athena right, Reverse; Pomegranate fruit.

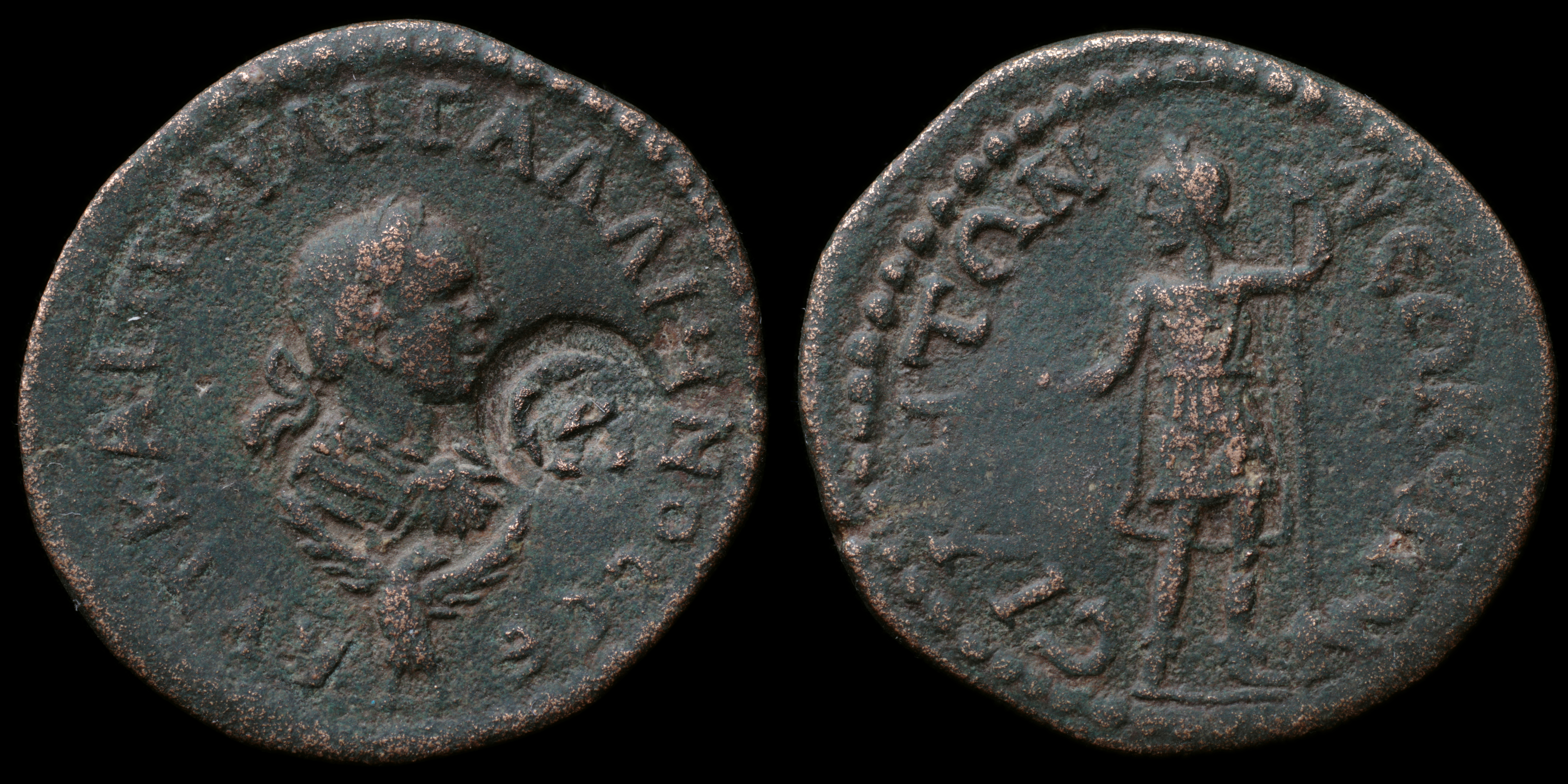
A bronze 11 assaria of Gallienus struck in Side 253-268 AD overstriked to pentassarion. Obverse; Laureate bust of Gallienus right over eagle, Reverse; Apollo Sidetes, holding phiale and scepter.

The coinage of Side is the output of numismatic production at Side, an ancient Greek colony in the region of Pamphylia, in modern-day Turkey.

== History ==
The earliest recorded coinage from Side, silver staters, date to approximately 490–400 BC. From this time up until the reign of the Roman emperor Claudius, the coinage of Side is representative of a fine Hellenic style, often featuring the helmeted busts of Athena on the obverse and the figure of Nike on the reverse. A frequent theme on this coinage is the pomegranate fruit, as the name Side was the word for pomegranate in the local language.

In Greek mythology, young Side's blood is transformed into a pomegranate tree after she kills herself trying to escape from her father.
