= Pomegranate carved in the round =

Object in the collection of the Metropolitan Museum of Art

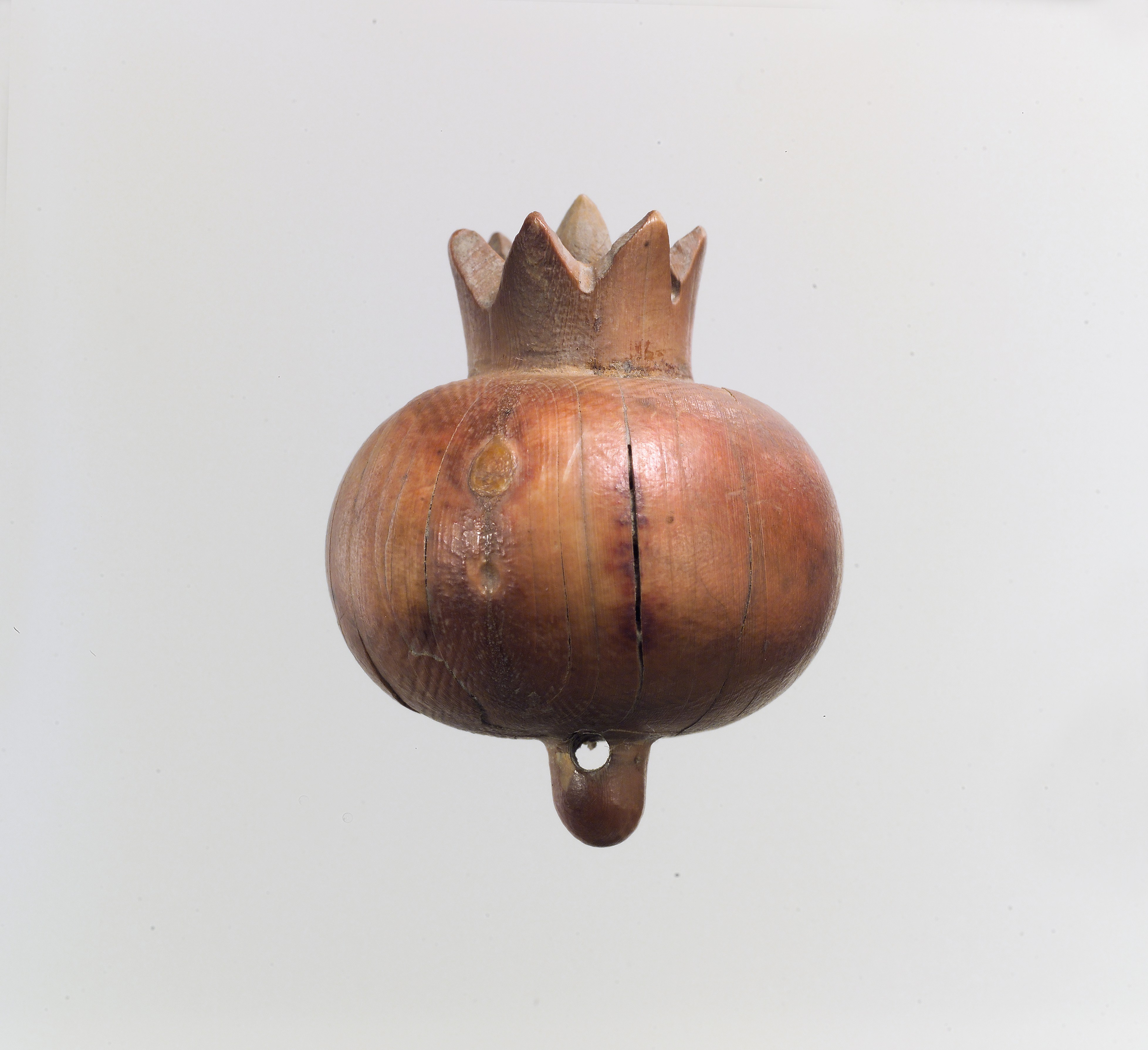
- Year: c. 9th–8th century B.C.
- Medium: Ivory
- Location: Metropolitan Museum of Art; New York City

Pomegranate carved in the round is an ivory bead shaped like a pomegranate. It is dated to the 8th century B.C. and is attributed to the Assyrian Empire. The ivory bead is currently held by the Metropolitan Museum of Art in its collection.

== Description ==
The ivory bead is shaped like a pomegranate, an object commonly depicted in Assyrian art. The reddish color of the bead was not intended; rather, the object is stained as a result of being buried in the ruins of Kalhu. A product of the trade routes of the Bronze Age Civilizations, the ivory used in the making of the piece was likely imported from Egypt.
