= Glass in sub-Saharan Africa =

Glass production in sub-Saharan Africa

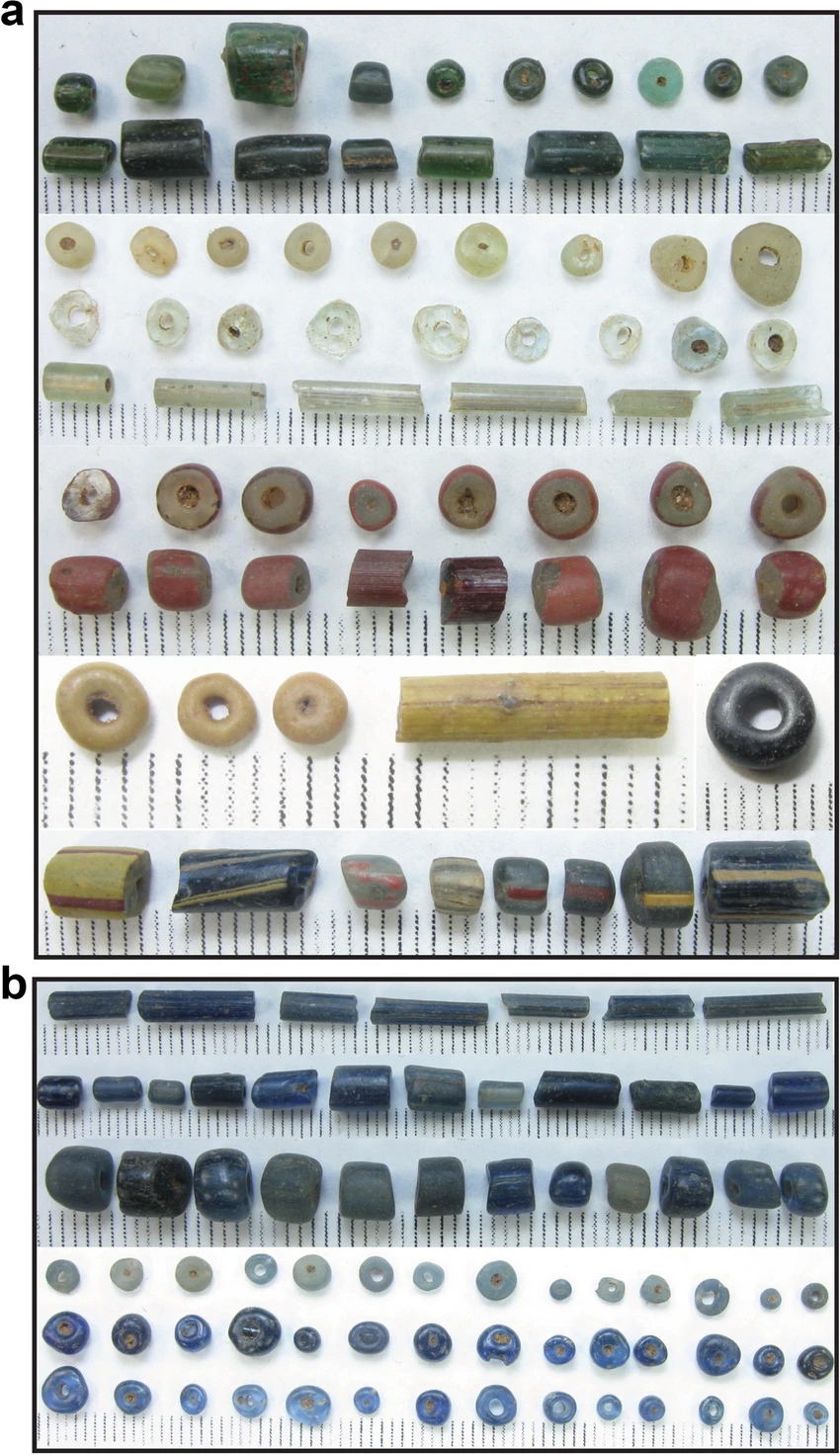
Glass beads of different colors and shapes from Ife Empire.

Glass in sub-Saharan Africa mostly consists of the importation of glass beads into sub-Saharan Africa, shipped primarily from the Middle East and India as early as 200-300 AD; later, from Portugal, the Netherlands, and Venice. Due to various differences in cultural histories and environmental resources, West African nations developed glass traditions distinct from Egypt, North Africa, and the rest of the world.

As most African cultures have long histories of crafting and adornment with beads made from wood, bone and shell, the introduction of glass as a bead material was widely and rapidly received. The exchange of glass beads for local goods such as ivory, gold and slaves aided in the accumulation of wealth and creation of unequal power dynamics still apparent today. Archaeological evidence, primarily from various burial sites from the West and coastal port cities in the East, confirm the import of hundreds of thousands of glass beads. These assemblages boast rich varieties in shape, color, texture and patterning. While most glass in sub-Saharan Africa was imported as pre-formed beads, there is evidence of the importation of glass fragments and ingots to be used in local beadmaking practices. Preliminary excavations also exhibit evidence of indigenous glass production from raw materials, a technology previously thought unknown to this region of the world. Recent evidence has shown that glass making may have been started separate from the general glass trade as early as the 1500s.

== Cultural and historical significance ==
=== Symbolism ===
In contemporary oral traditions amongst the Yoruba peoples of Ife, Nigeria it is recounted that Olokun, a creator god, was also divinity of the sea, of wealth and of beadmaking. Folklore states that Ife, a historic crafting centre, formed the centre of the universe, and appropriately produced such riches as glass beads. Similarly, blue Aggrey or Akori beads from Benin are believed to originate from a supernatural source and are associated with water and thunder. Glass beads have been linked to a number of religious and symbolic practices, primarily as offerings to deities at sacred locations and constructed shrines. As subsistence-level herding was common throughout much of sub-Saharan Africa, bead adornment was an apt medium for self and cultural expression; whereas a more permanent art form would have proven impractical. Through various bead shape formations, coloring choices and assemblage methods, individuals were able to express complex information which was particularly useful in the absence of written language. Notions such as age, marital status and relative economic wealth were communicated through careful selection of symbolic glass beads. The remelting and reworking of existing beads also suggests that the shape and style of glass beads held specific cultural values; various regions were able to imitate more favorable foreign styles, create unique forms or produce much larger beads than what was available through international trade, effectively expressing local distinctiveness. Glass beads also provided a means of connecting with ones ancestors. Known as Heirloom beads, these beads were typically translucent, resembling wax, having a discoid shape and usually could be dated back to the middle and late Iron Age. Whether strung as jewellery, attached to clothing or stored unassembled, Heirloom beads were extremely prized and often passed down from generation to generation.

=== Beads as economic wealth ===
Glass beads in sub-Saharan Africa were used as an economic tool, denoting wealth and political power. Yoruba kings, or Obas, often encouraged complicated and abundant glass beadworking as a visual symbol of their nation's wealth. Production of beads in great quantities could also be offered by Obas to various deities as a symbol of appreciation of such granted political and economic power. Aje Ilekes, discs of melted cullet (recycled material) glass with beads embedded, were produced by intentionally destroying and remelting glass beads, serving as a status symbol of power and wealth. Aje Ilekes are still used today as a monetary system, often exchanged as wedding dowry. In the archaeological record it is common to find numerous glass beads and beadworking tools such as stone anvils and crucibles included in burial sites suggesting the objects’ cultural and economic importance.

== Importation and trade ==
=== Analysis and chronology ===
==== Diagnostic analysis ====
Glass as a bead material proved particularly suitable for exportation to sub-Saharan Africa due to its durable quality and its extremely portable nature. While we know that millions of glass beads have made their way through the African continent, the identification of origin and relative date is often difficult to determine. The working, forming and decorating of glass beads often took place at sites independent of the primary production of glass from raw materials. During this secondary beadworking stage, primary glass from multiple geographic locations could potentially be mixed and melted together in a single batch. Colorants derived from mineral deposited spanning various regions were probably also added before reaching a beadworking site. What's more, beadworking and beadmaking processes almost always involved the reuse and recycling of materials, each time including new chemical contaminants. The tracing of glass beads by means of their chemical footprints is therefore often unfeasible. Unfortunately, difficulties arise when tracing glass beads by their physical characteristics as well. Shape, size, color and decoration in beads were commonly imitated and recreated across broad geographical and temporal ranges, effectively complicating diagnostic analysis. Additionally, the life span of glass beads was typically much longer than other materials. Beads such as Heirloom Beads were prized precisely because they had been passed down from generation to generation; again, making dating near impossible.

==== Early chronology ====
Attempts to determine date and origin of glass beads found in sub-Saharan Africa have been made with varying success. According to recent archeological research in Nigeria, there is evidence that glass was locally produced at Igbo Olokun, in Ifẹ, between the 11th century and 15th century AD. It is generally agreed that glass beads were present in sub-Saharan Africa by at least 300 AD, some having been imported from the Middle East and South East Asian regions. Transported by sea, shipments arrived to coastal ports such as Mtwapa and Ungwana in Kenya and were then distributed inland via local trade networks and kinship relations. On land, glass bead cargos travelled through North Africa south to areas such as Gao in Mali, as well as Nigeria, Ghana and Benin. The expansion of the Roman Empire helped to broaden trade patterns and the introduction of the camel as means of transport significantly fostered the spread of imported goods. European nations entered the African trading market, beginning with Portugal, Italy and Bohemia in the 15th century, followed by the Dutch, English, French, Belgians and Germans. By the 17th century, the Netherlands managed to secure an impressive monopoly on the glass bead exchange with sub-Saharan Africa. A Dutch merchant and entrepreneur named Sir Nicholas Crisp is recorded to have been awarded a patent "for the sole making and vending of beads and beugles to trade to Guinea," in 1632.

=== Types of beads ===
==== Trade wind beads ====
During the medieval period, trade of a particular style of glass bead, the Trade Wind bead, dominated the market. These beads ranged in color and length but could be mass-produced. Termed "Trade Wind beads" due to the use of monsoon winds for navigation, these beads were shipped throughout the Indian Ocean Trading Complex, especially to East, West and South African coastal ports. India and Sri Lanka contributed greatly to the exchange of Trade Wind beads though it has been disputed whether these countries also partook in the primary production of glass used for such beads. The mineral soda-alumina (abbreviated m-Na-Al or mNa) chemical composition of most Trade Wind Beads found in sub-Saharan Africa suggests a connection to the mineral-soda sources and alumina rich sand ubiquitous in India; however, there is no archaeological evidence to support this hypothesis to date. Other analysts propose a Middle Eastern, Venetian and/or Portuguese origin for the Trade Wind beads found in sub-Saharan Africa.

==== Slave beads ====
European nations became increasingly involved in the glass bead trade with Africa which consequently aided in the foreign exploitation of natural resources, including slaves. Because Westerners viewed Africans as "the uncivilised of the World," glass beads known crudely as "slave beads" were commonly exchanged for human cargo which could then be shipped and traded for other desired goods. The residual effects from the glass bead trade had dramatically varying results across sub-Saharan Africa. While most regions suffered economic and social hardship due to abusive foreign monopolies, some nations prospered from this interaction. Coastal ports serving as initial points of contact often benefited from access to imported goods, reaping profits from their own subsequent distribution to regions inland. Scholars have suggested that the rise of empires in Ghana and Mali between the 8th and 13th centuries, as well as the Kingdoms of Benin and Akan during the 16th century are intrinsically related to the access and distribution of foreign glass beads.

== Bead manufacture ==
=== Glass manufacture: primary and secondary glass production ===
Primary glass production involves the combination of the raw materials soda, lime and silica, heated at specific temperatures in order to produce a basic glass compound. Traditionally, glass has been made from either the mixture of ground quartz stones (providing the silica) and plant ash (supplying the soda and lime elements); or, by utilizing sand as a silica and lime source and then adding a chemical natron for the remaining soda needed. The production of primary glass has seen much variation throughout its history, each region slightly altering the chemical composition to better suit its particularly environmental and cultural needs (i.e. adding various fluxes/chemical additives in order to lower the required melting temperature). The addition of mineral deposits to alter the color of glass can be carried out in the primary stage or can be added in later stages of production. The secondary production of glass typically involves processes of coloring, remelting, shaping and decorating of the glass object. While some archaeological evidence suggests the concurrence of both primary and secondary glass production at the same site, in the case of glass beads these processes often occurred separately. As access to premade glass and foreign colorants increased, beadmaking from imported goods developed into a technology which could be conducted in virtually any location across the globe.

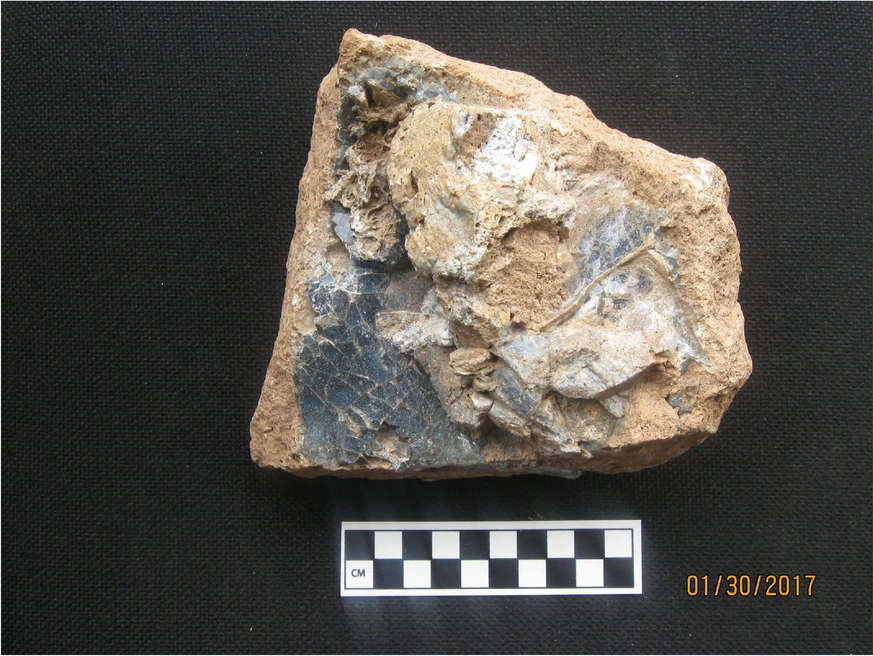
Crucible fragment from Ile-Ife, Nigeria, with semi-finished glass stuck to the bottom

==== Primary production evidence ====
The most conclusive archaeological evidence for the primary production of glass in sub-Saharan Africa comes from Ile-Ife, Nigeria, though finds in Gao, Mali, Benin and Ghana also support such inferences. Crucibles with glass layering and exterior vitrification indicative of production from raw materials prompted further compositional analysis. Archaeologist concluded that the glass found in the crucibles of Ile-Ife had a uniquely high percentage of lime and alumina compounds, a glass formula known only to exist in Korea. Importation of glass from Korea can be ruled out as this area only produced small quantities of glass, supplies no evidence of glass bead production and mainly only experimented with glazing. European, Middle Eastern, Indian and Chinese origins for the glass found at Ile-Ife can also be excluded as none of these traditions produced glass high in both lime and alumina. It has been suggested that this unique high-lime, high alumina glass could represent an entirely new glass making technology in which the alkali (soda) and alumina were derived from separate mineral sources. The lime source would also have been added separately; most probably in the form of limestone, marble or shell. These proposed sources for lime, native to Nigeria and other regions in sub-Saharan Africa, comprise a novel yet plausible primary production process. Neighboring areas, such as the sites at Ita Yemoo and Igbo-Ukwu, contain glass working evidence such as crucibles, cullets, and beads, all with high-lime, high-alumina glass compositions suggesting the secondary production of glass imported from Ile-Ife. Whether primary production technology was learned and transferred from abroad or locally invented is unknown. Most reasonably, the presence of imported glass beads pre-existed primary production technology which was later developed through processes of trial and error.

Igbo Olokun, also known as Olokun Grove, may be one of the earliest workshops for producing glass in West Africa. Glass production may have begun during, if not before, the 11th century. The 11th - 15th century were the peak of glass production. High lime, high alumina (HLHA) and low lime, high alumina (LLHA) glass are distinct compositions that were developed using locally sourced recipes, raw materials, and pyrotechnology. The presence of HLHA glass beads discovered throughout West Africa (e.g., Igbo-Ukwu in southern Nigeria, Gao and Essouk in Mali, and Kissi in Burkina Faso), after the ninth century CE, reveals the broader importance of this glass industry in the region and shows its participation in regional trade networks (e.g., trans-Saharan trade, trans-Atlantic trade). Glass beads served as "the currency for negotiating political power, economic relations, and cultural/spiritual values" for "Yoruba, West Africans, and the African diaspora."

=== Beadworking ===
The production of beads from imported glass shards, cullet (scraps) and undesired glass beads has a lively presence in the history of sub-Saharan Africa. Imported glass was either formed by melting such imported glass, potentially adding desired colorants, and then shaping the melt into a bead form; or, by grinding down the imported glass to form a powder which would then be shaped, heated and cooled. The archaeological evidence of beadworking in sub-Saharan Africa provides examples of both types.

==== Beadworking sites ====
Archaeological evidence, coupled with historical documentation and oral tradition provide evidence of numerous beadmaking sites in sub-Saharan Africa. Found Nupe beads from Nigeria suggest native individuals produced beads from scrap glass and bottles. Remains from the Ashanti region in Ghana imply beadmaking from molds using imported powdered glass. Sites such as Gao, Mali and Igbo-Ukwu, Nigeria provide evidence for the production of Carnelian Bead. It is not known whether the Carnelian was a local material; however, bead production has been confirmed due to the discovery of lumps of imported raw glass and other glassworking equipment. Mapungbwe, South Africa provides another example of beadmaking. This site dates between 600 and 1200 AD and contains evidence of glass working from pulverized bottles, ingots and other beads.

=== Types of beads ===
==== Wound glass beads ====
With melted glass working, beads found were generally formed by either a wound, drawn or molded process. Wound glass beads, also known as Tubular, Cylindrical, Spherical or Melon-Shaped, were formed by folding molten glass around a metal rod called a mandrel. Once the glass had cooled slightly, the material was slipped off the mandrel and pinched and prodded until it reached a desired shape.

==== Drawn glass beads ====
Also known as Cane beads, Drawn beads were formed by dipping an iron blowpipe into molten glass and slightly blowing air through the pipe, allowing for a "gather," or hollow glass ball, to form at the end. A rod called a ‘puntil’ was used to pull the gather into a longer, hollow form which would then cool and be broken into individual beads. As glassblowing technology did not exist in the early history of sub-Saharan Africa, locally produced drawn beads were made by trapping air bubbles in molten glass and then drawing the glass into a cane form.

==== Moulded glass beads ====
Little evidence of beads produced from molds are found in sub-Saharan Africa; however, it is understood that beads of this form were produced by dropping molten glass into a preformed open clay mold and then "punched" with a core to take on the mould's form. Holes could then be drilled through molded beads or, beads produced from half molds could then be adhered together.

==== Powder glass beads ====
The glass beads of sub-Saharan Africa that were not melted from pre-existing glass material were instead formed by grinding glass into a fine powder to be worked further. Sources for such glass included scraps from broken glass bottles, cullets (recycled glass) or pre-existing glass beads which were no longer wanted. The grinding process generally caused coloring to be lost; therefore, various pigments were often added at this stage. After the desired color was achieved, powdered glass was either worked in its dry form or was wetted with water or saliva to create a paste. This paste was next formed by hand into various bead shapes. Powder Glass Beads were then heated, allowed to cool and finally, polished. Garden Roller beads, such as the Bodom beads of Ghana. were the earliest form of powder glass beads found, made by threading glass in a mold with a mandrel. This process was extremely labor-intensive and expensive as the mold used was unable to be reused. More common were the Kiffa beads, typically associated with Mauritania. These beads were produced from the wet-form of powder glass production, and have been found since the 8th century. The paste produced in wet-form production was shaped into a bead using frames typically made of leaves of grass and then were decorated and colored using a needle.

==== Lapidary beads ====
Though technically made from glass, the lapidary style of bead production is more akin to stone working than proper glass manufacturing. This process involved the recycling of imported glass by chipping, knapping, drilling and polishing pieces to a desired bead form. Evidence from areas outside of Ile-Ife, Nigeria suggests that individuals scavenged for discarded glass remains from earlier burial sites at Olokun Grove. Glass remains that had been brought to the upper soil layers (either naturally or via "mining") were collected and worked to produce new glass beads.

=== Coloring ===
Coloring of glass could either be achieved by adding bits of pre-existing colored glass, such as bottle shards or beads, by adding scrap metals, or by adding mineral pigments directly. The beads found in sub-Saharan Africa generally contained the following pigment sources: Red was achieved by adding small amounts of metallic copper. The presence of Iron could also produce a red color, as well as form green and brown tones. When copper was present and cooled in an oxidizing atmosphere (i.e. great exposure to oxygen) glass could achieve a blue-green color. To get a clear blue color cobalt was often used. To produce a purple color manganese was added, and in the right environments manganese was also used as a decoloring agent. Yellow and opaque white were created by the addition of antimony and lead or tin and lead and if a stronger orange color was desired zinc was then added as well. While the coloring of imported glass certainly took place in local sub-Saharan beadworking sites, this does not imply that the minerals utilized came from local sources. Many glass pigments were most likely imported from abroad to beadworking sites in sub-Saharan Africa.

== See also ==
- Powder glass beads
- Glass bead making
- Trade beads
