= Glass bead making =

Art form

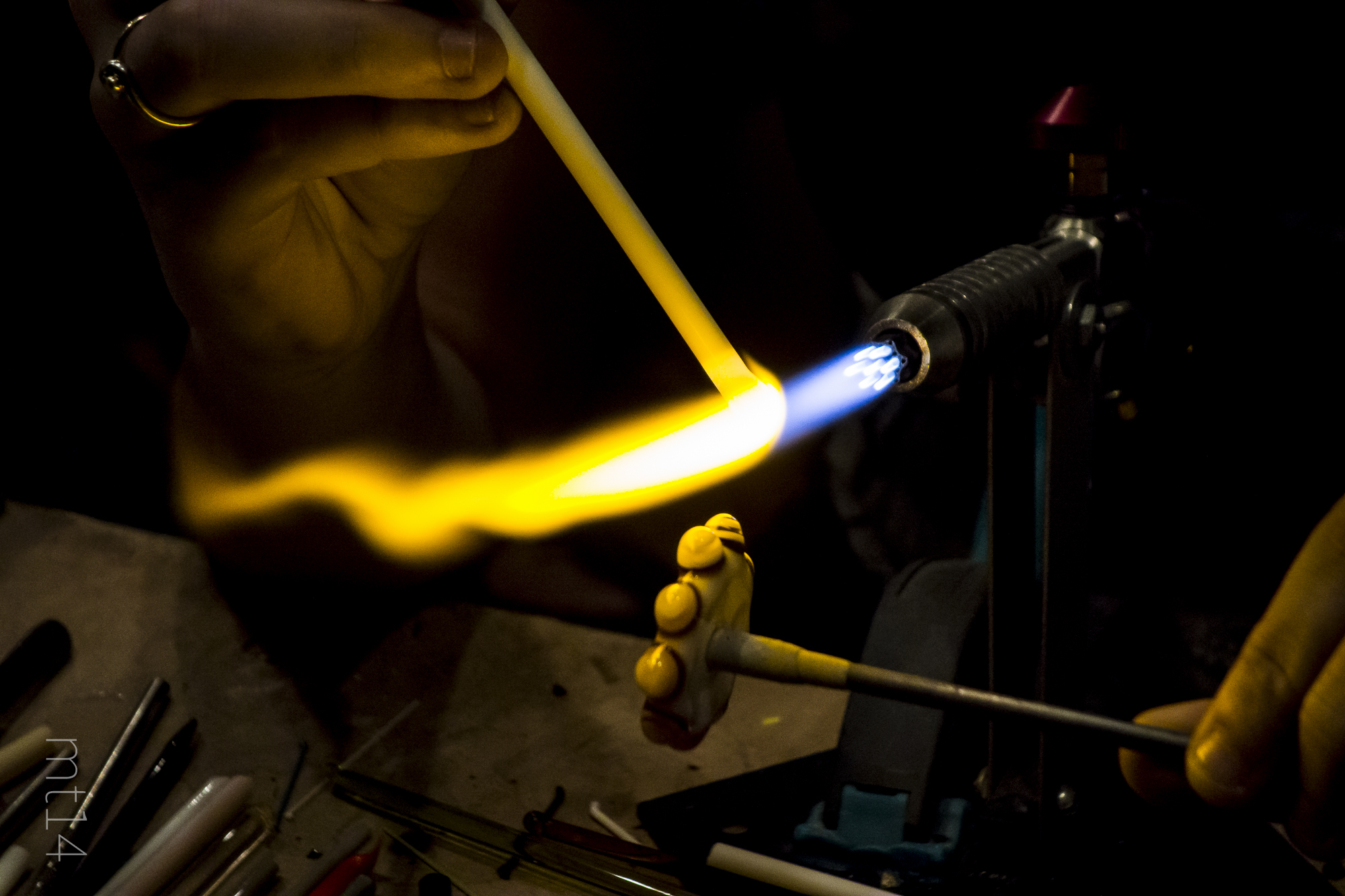
Lampworking-closeup

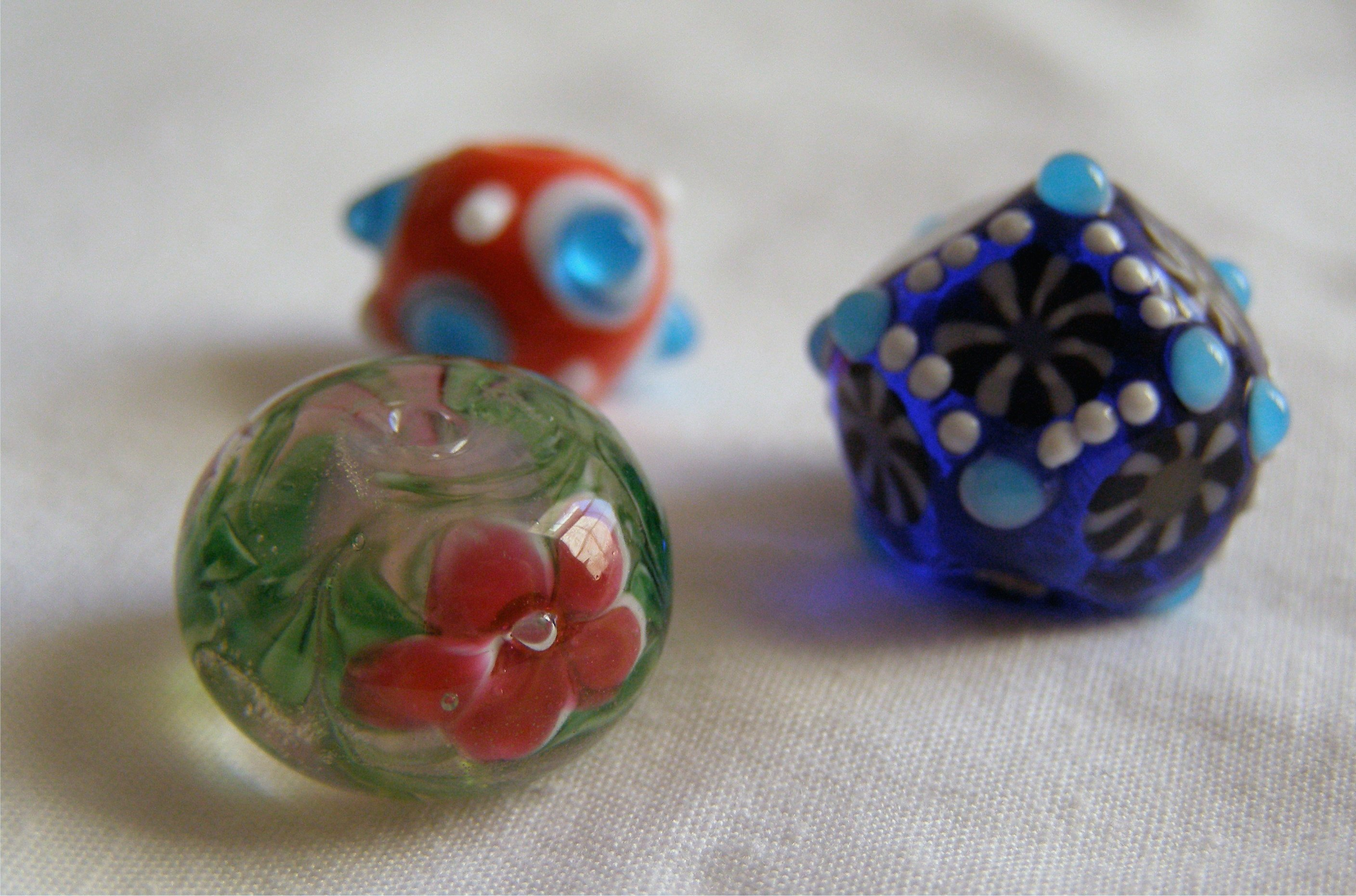
Lampwork glass beads

Documenting the step by step process of crafting Krobo glass beads and preserving cultural heritage.

Glass bead making has long traditions, with the oldest known beads dating over 3,000 years. People have been making beads out of glass since at least Ancient Roman times. Perhaps the earliest glass-like beads were Egyptian faience beads, a form of clay bead with a self-forming vitreous coating. Glass beads are significant in archaeology because the presence of glass beads often indicates that there was trade and that the bead making technology was being spread. In addition, the composition of the glass beads could be analyzed and help archaeologists understand the sources of the beads.

Around 1,500 BC, in Egypt and Mesopotamia, glass beads became popular decorative items, symbolizing wealth, artistry, and expanding trade across ancient civilizations.

== Common types of glass bead manufacture ==
Glass beads are usually categorized by the method used to manipulate the glass: wound beads, drawn beads, and molded beads. There are composites, such as millefiori beads, where cross-sections of a drawn glass cane are applied to a wound glass core. A very minor industry in blown glass beads also existed in 19th-century Venice and France.

=== Wound glass beads ===
One of the earliest processes of making glass beads used the winding method. Glass is heated to a temperature high enough to make it workable, or "ductile", and is then laid down or wound around a steel wire or mandrel coated in a clay slip called "bead release". The wound bead, while still hot, may be further shaped by manipulating with graphite, wood, stainless steel, brass, tungsten, or marble tools and paddles. This process is called marvering, a term derived from the French marbrer, 'to marble'. It can also be pressed into a mold in its molten state. While still hot, or after re-heating, the surface of the bead may be decorated with fine rods of colored glass called stringers to create a type of lampwork bead.

=== Drawn glass beads ===
The drawing of glass is also ancient. Evidence of large-scale drawn-glass bead making has been found by archeologists in India, at sites like Arikamedu dating to the 2nd century CE. The small drawn beads made by that industry have been called Indo-Pacific beads, because they may have been the single most widely traded item in history—found from the islands of the Pacific to Great Zimbabwe in southern Africa.

There are several methods for making drawn beads, but they all involve pulling a strand out of a gather of glass in such a way as to incorporate a bubble in the center of the strand to serve as the hole in the bead. In Arekamedu this was accomplished by inserting a hollow metal tube into the ball of hot glass and pulling the glass strand out around it, to form a continuous glass tube. In the Venetian bead industry, molten glass was gathered on the end of a tool called a puntile ("puntying up"), a bubble was incorporated into the center of a gather of molten glass, and a second puntile was attached before stretching the gather with its internal bubble into a long cane. The pulling was a skilled process, and canes were reportedly drawn to lengths up to 200 feet (61 m) long. The drawn tube was then chopped, producing individual drawn beads from its slices. The resulting beads were cooked or rolled in hot sand to round the edges without melting the holes closed. They were then sieved into sizes, and, usually, strung onto hanks for sale.

The most common type of modern glass bead is the seed bead, a small type of bead typically less than 6 mm (0.24 in), traditionally monochrome, and manufactured in very large quantities. They are a modern example of mechanically drawn glass beads. Seed beads, so called due to their tiny, regular size, are produced in the modern day from machine-extruded glass. Seed beads vary in shape; though most are round, some, such as Miyuki delicas, resemble small tubes.

=== Molded beads ===
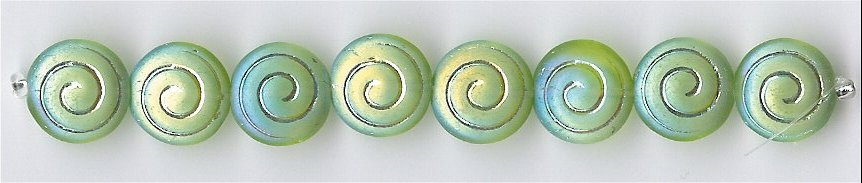
Pressed glass beads

Pressed or molded beads are associated with lower labour costs. These were commonly produced in the Czech Republic in the early 20th century. Thick glass rods are heated to molten and fed into a complex apparatus that stamps the glass, including a needle that pierces a hole. The beads are rolled in hot sand to remove flashing and soften seam lines. By making canes (the glass rods fed into the machine) striped or otherwise patterned, the resulting beads can be more elaborately colored than seed beads. One "feed" of a hot rod might result in 10–20 beads, and a single operator can make thousands in a day. Glass beads are also manufactured or moulded using a rotary machine where molten glass is fed into the centre of a rotary mould and solid or hollow glass beads are formed.

The Bohemian glass industry was known for its ability to copy more expensive beads, and produced molded glass "lion's teeth", "coral", and "shells", which were popular in the 19th and early 20th century Africa trade.

=== Lampwork beads ===
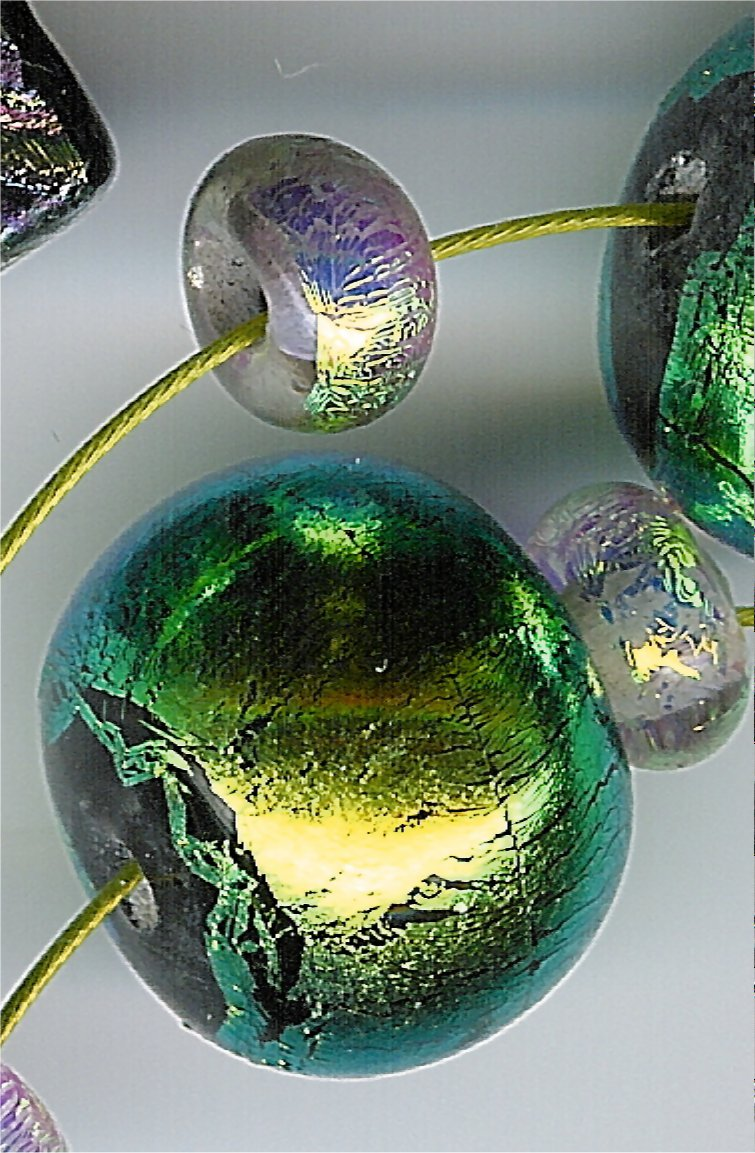
Lampworked dichroic glass bead showing thin film application

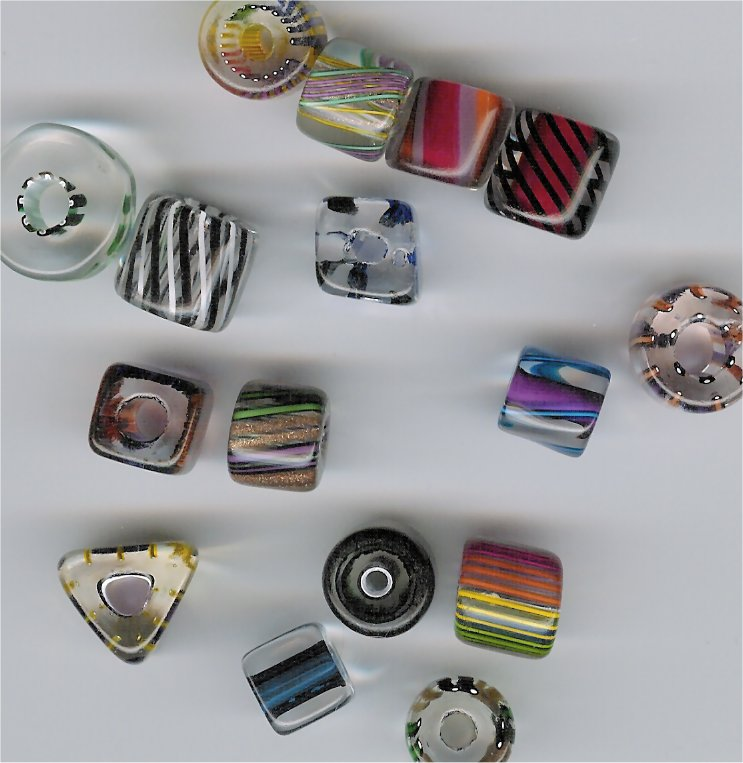
Furnace glass beads

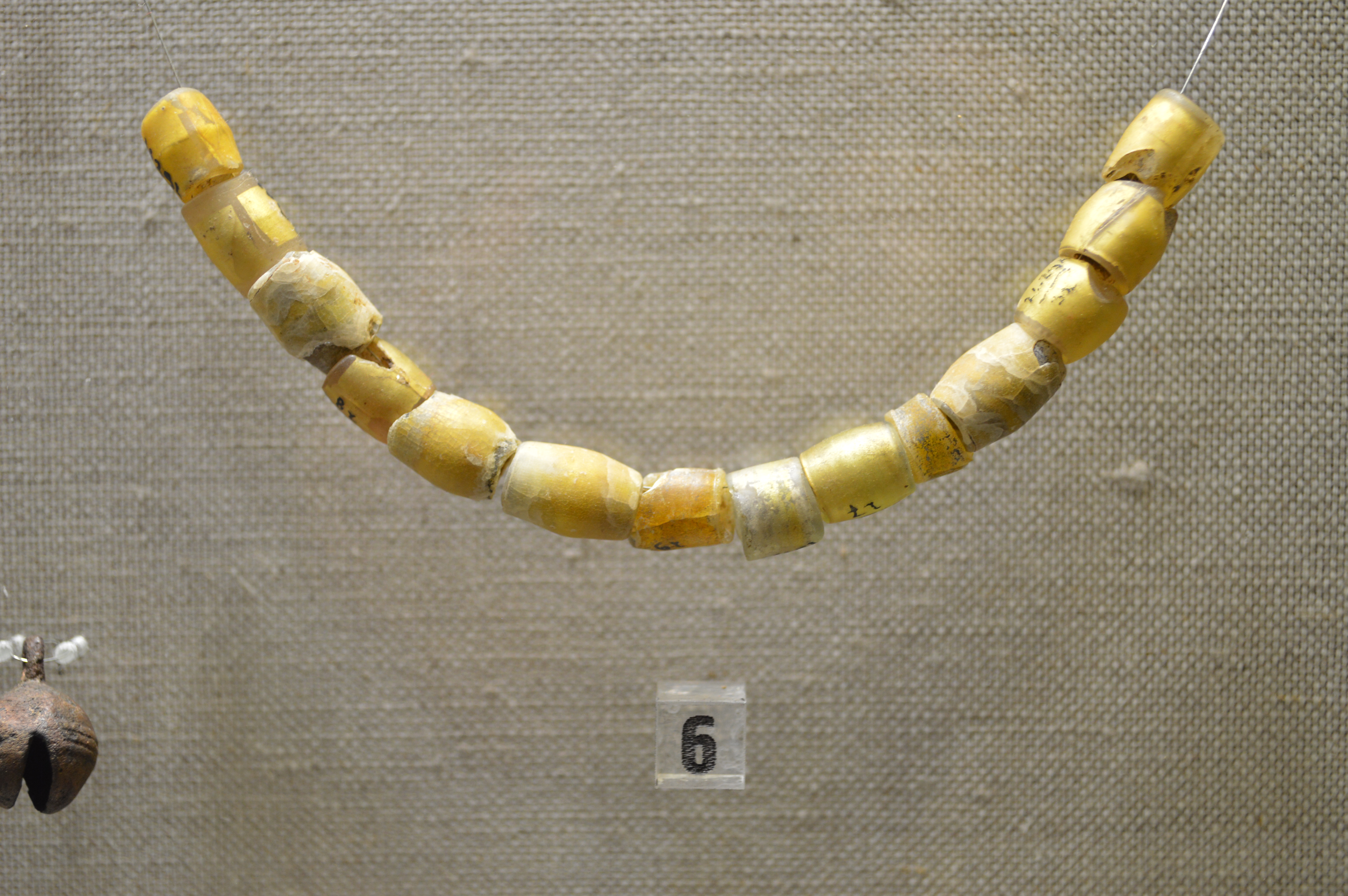
Gold glass beads, 12-13 century

A variant of the wound glass bead making technique, and a labor-intensive one, is what is traditionally called lampworking. In the Venetian industry, where very large quantities of beads were produced in the 19th century for the African trade, the core of a decorated bead was produced from molten glass at furnace temperatures, a large-scale industrial process dominated by men. The delicate multicolored decoration was then added by people, mostly women, working at home using an oil lamp or spirit lamp to re-heat the cores and the fine wisps of colored glass used to decorate them. These workers were paid on a piecework basis for the resulting lampwork beads. Modern lampwork beads are made by using a gas torch to heat a rod of glass and spinning the resulting thread around a metal rod covered in bead release. When the base bead has been formed, other colors of glass can be added to the surface to create many designs. After this initial stage of the bead making process, the bead can be further fired in a kiln to make it more durable.

Modern bead makers use single or dual fuel torches, hence the more modern term flameworked. Unlike a metalworking torch, or burner, a flameworking torch is usually "surface mix"; that is, the oxygen and fuel (typically propane, though natural gas is also common) is mixed after it comes out of the torch, resulting in a quieter tool and less dirty flame. Also unlike metalworking, the torch is fixed, and the bead and glass move in the flame. American torches are usually mounted at about a 45-degree angle, a result of scientific glassblowing heritage; Japanese torches are recessed, and have flames coming straight up, like a large bunsen burner; Czech production torches tend to be positioned nearly horizontally.

=== Dichroic glass beads ===
Dichroic glass is used to produce high-end art beads. Dichroic glass has a thin film of metal fused to the surface of the glass, resulting in a surface that has a metallic sheen that changes between two colors when viewed at different angles. Beads can be pressed, or made with traditional lampworking techniques. If the glass is kept in the flame too long, the metallic coating will turn silver and burn off.

=== Furnace glass ===
Italian glass blowing techniques, such as latticinio and zanfirico, have been adapted make beads. Furnace glass uses large decorated canes built up out of smaller canes, encased in clear glass and then extruded to form the beads with linear and twisting stripe patterns. No air is blown into the glass. These beads require a large scale glass furnace and annealing kiln for manufacture.

=== Lead crystal ===
Lead crystal beads are machine-cut and polished. Their high lead content makes them sparkle more than other glass, but also makes them inherently fragile.

== Other methods ==
Lead glass (for neon signs) and, especially borosilicate is available in tubing, allowing for glass blown beads. (Soda-lime glass can be blown at the end of a metal tube, or, more commonly wound on the mandrel to make a hollow bead, but the former is unusual and the latter not a true mouth-blown technique.) In addition, beads can be fused from sheet glass or using ground glass.

Modern Ghana has an industry in beads molded from powdered glass. Also in Africa, Kiffa beads are made in Mauritania, historically by women, using powdered glass that the bead maker usually grinds from commercially available glass seed beads and recycled glass.

Molded ground glass, if painted into the mold, is called pate de verre, and the technique can be used to make beads, though pendants and cabochons are more typical. Lampwork (and other) beads can be painted with glass paints.

== See also ==
- Glass art
- Glass bead road surface marking
- Murano beads
