= Trade beads =

Historic form of currency

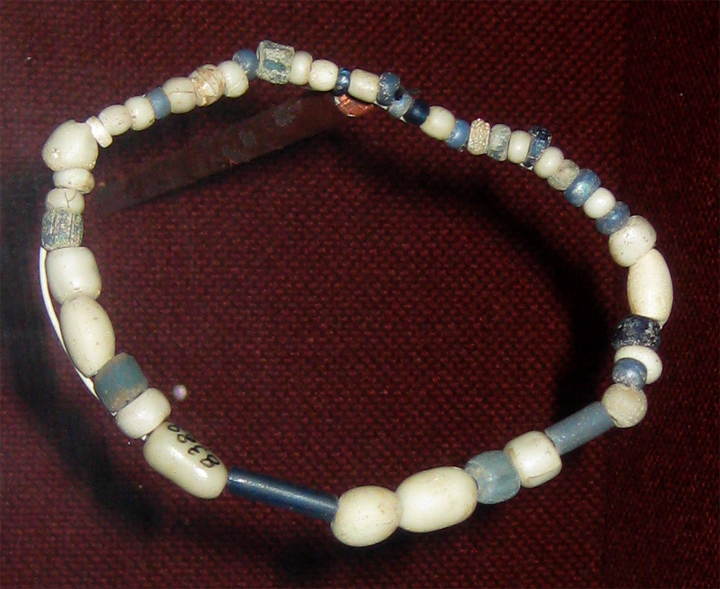
Trade beads from ca. 1740, found in a Wichita village site in present-day Oklahoma

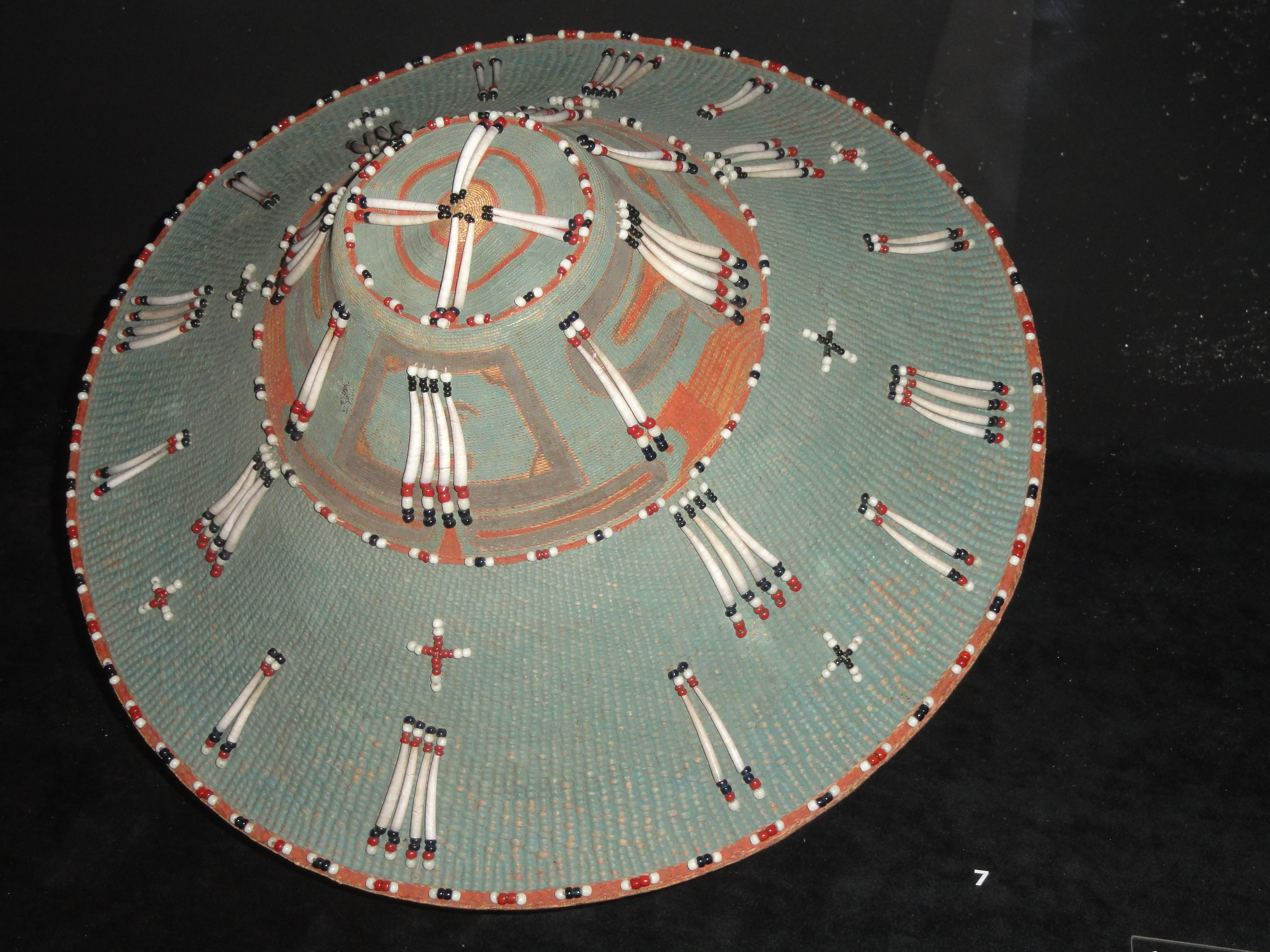
Chugach woven spruce-root hat

Trade beads are beads that were used as a medium of barter within and amongst human communities. They are considered to be one of the earliest forms of trade between members of the human race. It has also been suggested that bead trading was one of the reasons why humans developed language.

The success of this form of currency can be attributed to the work required to produce them locally (i.e. scarcity) and salability across space as well as the fact that they are easily portable, countable, and divisible, do not decay, and carry intrinsic value as objects of ornamentation in many cultures. They could be incorporated into decorative beadworks which could easily be broken down again into individual beads to facilitate smaller purchases.

== History ==
=== Africa ===
Red beads made of coral, and later of glass, were used as an instrument of barter in Madagascar starting in the 12th century (and possibly earlier). Though they were traded by all classes, only those of noble status were permitted to wear them. The beads were also used in the creation of ody charms.

Beads were later produced in Europe as a trade good to ease the passage of European explorers and traders mainly across the African continent. The beads were made throughout Europe although the Venetians dominated production.

The production of slave (trade) beads became so popular that literally tons of these beads were used for this purpose. Beads were used as ballast in slave/trade ships for the outbound trip. The beads and other trade items were exchanged for human cargo as well as ivory, gold, and other goods desired in Europe and around the world. The beads traded were not of a set design, but were produced according to demand. Millefiori (thousand flower) beads from Venice, Italy were one of the most commonly traded beads, and are commonly known as "African trade beads." They were produced by creating flowers or stripes from glass canes, that were then cut and moulded onto a core of solid color.

Glass beadmaking was not common in Africa and the ease of production of these beads by European artisans enabled exploitation via a speculative attack on this West African monetary system. Africans often used beads for currency and wealth storage, and social status could be easily determined by the quality, quantity and style of jewellery worn. This created a high demand for trade beads in Africa.

In some cases, different colors of beads seem to have been designated as an exchange medium for different types of good (e.g. one type of bead might be traded exclusively for gold, another for slaves, etc.)

Beads manufactured in Europe continued to accompany exploration of Africa using Indigenous routes into the interior as recently as the late nineteenth century.

Beads such as the kiffa beads of Mauritania are thought to have resulted from women creating powdered glass beads to mimic the appearance of millefiori beads. Aggry beads are a particular type of decorated glass bead from Ghana. The practice continued until the early twentieth century.

=== Australia and Oceania ===
See also: Shell money § Oceania and Australia

Shell beads were commonly used for both ornamentation and as currency in island societies. In some cases (as in Palau and New Britain), different colors of shells were assigned different values. Shell beads were used as both decoration and currency on the Gilbert Islands (now part of Kiribati) in the South Pacific Ocean.

While the shells themselves might be valuable, at least part of the acknowledged value of the beads seemed to derive from the labor involved in their production; the anthropologist Sir Richard Carnac Temple notes that shell beads were valued as the highest form of currency among inhabitants of the Banks Islands (now part of Vanatu) of the South Pacific specifically because the bead-making process was labor-intensive.

Beads made of other materials were also employed as currency. Glass, enamel, terracota, red stone (bungan or pangungan), and agate (kalkbut) beads were used as currency in Palau. Other South Pacific groups traded in beads made of pearls, coconut shells, nut shells, and tortoiseshell.

=== North America ===
Trade beads were used United States and Canada, and throughout Latin America.

Venetian glass trade beads were found at three prehistoric Inuit habitation sites in Alaska, including Punyik Point. Uninhabited today and located a mile from the Continental Divide in the Brooks Range, the area was a part of ancient trade routes from the Bering Sea to the Arctic Ocean. Researchers believe that the beads were likely brought across Eurasia and over the Bering Strait, making this discovery "the first documented instance of the presence of indubitable European materials in prehistoric sites in the western hemisphere as the result of overland transport across the Eurasian continent." The beads were dated to between 1440 and 1480 using radiocarbon dating (predating Christopher Columbus' 1492 expedition. The dating and provenance has been challenged by other researchers, who point out that such beads were not made in Venice until the mid-sixteenth century and positing an early-seventeenth-century French origin.

Bead designs were variable. Large blue beads were favoured early in the trade, although details of when European trade with Native Americans began remain elusive. The frequency of archaeological discovery of each type indicates their popularity. Members of the Lewis and Clark Expedition observed trade of blue glass "chief beads" in the Pacific Northwest.

In sixteenth-century continental North America, trade beads (sometimes called aggry beads or slave beads) were decorative glass beads used as a token money to exchange for goods, services and slaves (hence the name). The beads were integrated in Native American jewelry using various beadwork techniques.

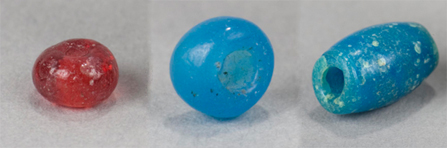
Nineteenth-century European trade beads found in Alaska

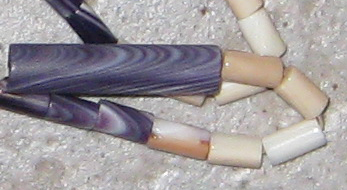
A modern-day example of white and purple wampum beads.

Wampum beads constructed from clamshells, were also highly valued by the native people of Northeastern North America. Despite this material being accessible to natives, the beads were not commonly used in trading prior the arrival of Europeans but rather as symbolic and social currency. Only the machine-made European beads became widely used as an instrument of barter. Wampum beads briefly served as legal tender in colonial Virginia, with purple beads being worth around twice as much as white beads.

The Chumash people of the west coast (modern-day California) had a market economy based on lentiform beads; these were constructed of the shells of various mollusc species. The beads were strung on threads and sold in lengths called poncos ("two turns of the strings about the wrist and the extended third finger"). They were also woven into ornaments which were worn on the head and neck.

The Cahuilla people of Southern California used strings of beads as a currency; these were traded exclusively by clan leaders, who were charged with managing the wealth of the entire clan. Clan leaders were tattooed on the forearms with markings used to measure the length of the bead strands.

== South America ==
Many societies in northern South America traded in shell beads. These included the Achagua, Arawak, Bariagoto, Cabetter, Guahibo, Kalina (Caribe), Maiba, Parmiagoto, Tivitive, Otomaco, and Pumé (Yaruro) people. The beads were referred to by various names including quirípa, quitero, or chucuchucu. They carried symbolic and ceremonial value among many South American societies.

Quirípa beads were arranged on strings and sold by length. They were originally constructed of freshwater mollusk shells called nemu or memu; after the seventeenth century silver and other mollusk shells also began to be used. The Cuica people also traded in beads made of polished green stone and colored bone.

After the Spanish colonized portions of South America, they continued to use quirípa as currency, in part to combat a shortage of gold; the exchange rate of a string of beads to the Spanish real varied regionally. The value of quirípa declined in the nineteenth century following the introduction of glass beads made by European artisans. European shirt buttons, generally made of bone, shell, or porcelin, were also briefly popular in the mid-1800s century. Despite these alternatives, quirípa were still being traded by members of the Otomac and Arawak groups through the early nineteenth century.

== See also ==
- Ancient glass trade
- Shell money
- History of glass in sub-Saharan Africa
- History of money
- List of historical currencies
