= Aggry beads =

Decorated glass bead

Aggry beads (also spelled aggri beads or aggrey beads) are a type of decorated glass bead from Ghana, used by West Africans as ornaments in necklaces, bracelets and other jewelry.

Aggry beads are also called Akori, Koli, Cori(s), Kor, Segi, Accori, or Ekeur. They were also referred to by the indigenous people by several other names like Buta, or Kor-pa as they were called in the Fante (or Fanti) dialect of Ghana. The Akori or Aggry beads belong to a broader category of beads used along the Gulf of Guinea coast, referred to by the Portuguese name "Conte de Terra" lit. "Beads from the ground". Recent archaeological work has pointed to the fact that these beads were actually products of the glassmaking industry of Ife. Glass production in Ife stopped in the late 14th century, but products such as the beads continued to circulate across the region as prestige items. Ancestral sites where they were buried became sources for procurement of old beads to inject into the local and regional economy, and their rarity only increased their value. One account from 1898 describes them as being worth more than three times their weight in gold.

They are often used for medicinal purposes, as it is believed that they have spiritual significance. They are a significant aspect of modern prenatal and postnatal care, as they are highly valued for protection against illness and misfortune. Various other uses and connotations include but are not limited to: representing wealth, marital status, health, representing social and political standing.

Trade beads were used for exchange and as a means of payment during trade in Africa. Europeans first collected aggry beads from the West Coast of Africa in the fifteenth century. These beads have been found in the residences and sites of enslaved Africans and African Americans in the Southern United States. While it is known that they come primarily from west and central Africa, it is difficult to be more specific because of the separation of families and ethnic groups by those who enslaved them, causing various traditions to be lost or combined with other traditions to form a new practice.

The origin of the aggry bead is obscure. Depending on different sources, beads labelled such may be made from glass, coral, or stone, and were typically blue. It is possible that the original aggry beads came from the Phoenicians, who used them as trade beads along the coasts of Europa, Asia, and Africa.

One of their origin stories from the Yoruba people is that these sacred beads grew out of the ground or that they were pieces of coral along the coast. This recount exists within the context of the worship of Olokun, the god of wealth and the primordial ocean Okun. Further tied together is the link between the ocean and fertility by Yoruba beliefs that Olokun makes all of the Yoruba women fertile with his spirit in the water. Another link can be found between the use of these beads and the idea of fertility. In Badagry, Kori is the name of a goddess who wanted children so much that she conferred with Ifa and because of this, she became fertile enough to have a city of her own children. Today, Yoruba women (specifically Kori's devotees) wear Kori beads as a representations of fertility. The beads serve as signs indicating her love for children.

Sometimes millefiori beads are called "Aggrey", but this may be incorrect.
