= Powder glass beads =

African bead variety

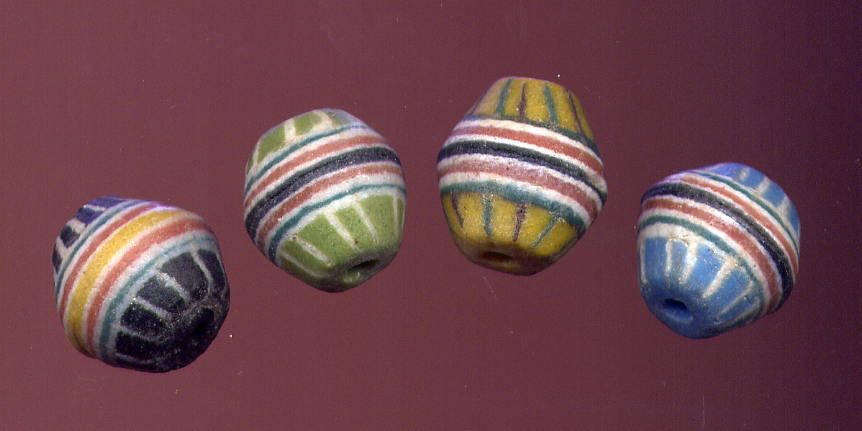
Krobo powder glass beads, bicones

Powder glass beads are a type of necklace ornamentation. The earliest such beads, dated to between 970 and 1000 CE, were discovered during archaeological excavations at Mapungubwe in South Africa. Manufacturing of powder glass beads is now concentrated in West Africa, particularly in the Ghana area. The origins of glass bead making in Ghana are unknown, but the great majority of powder glass beads produced today is made mainly by Krobo craftsmen and some Ashanti people. Krobo bead making has been documented to date from as early as the 1920s but despite limited archaeological evidence, it is believed that Ghanaian powder glass bead making dates further back. Bead making in Ghana was first documented by John Barbot in 1746. Beads still play important roles in Krobo society, be it in rituals of birth, coming of age, marriage, or death.

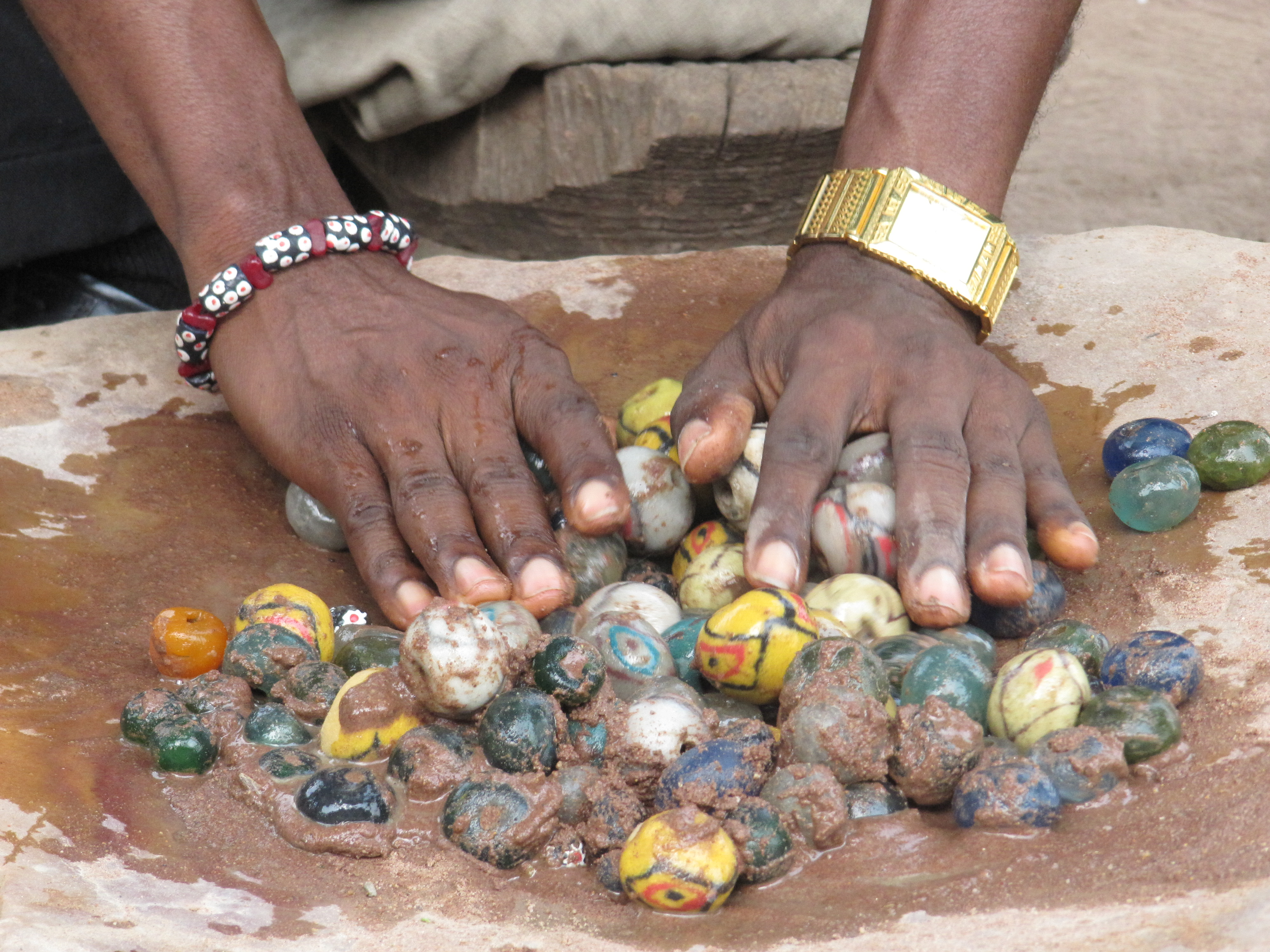
Polishing of Ghanaian glass beads, Cedi bead factory, Odumase Krobo, Ghana

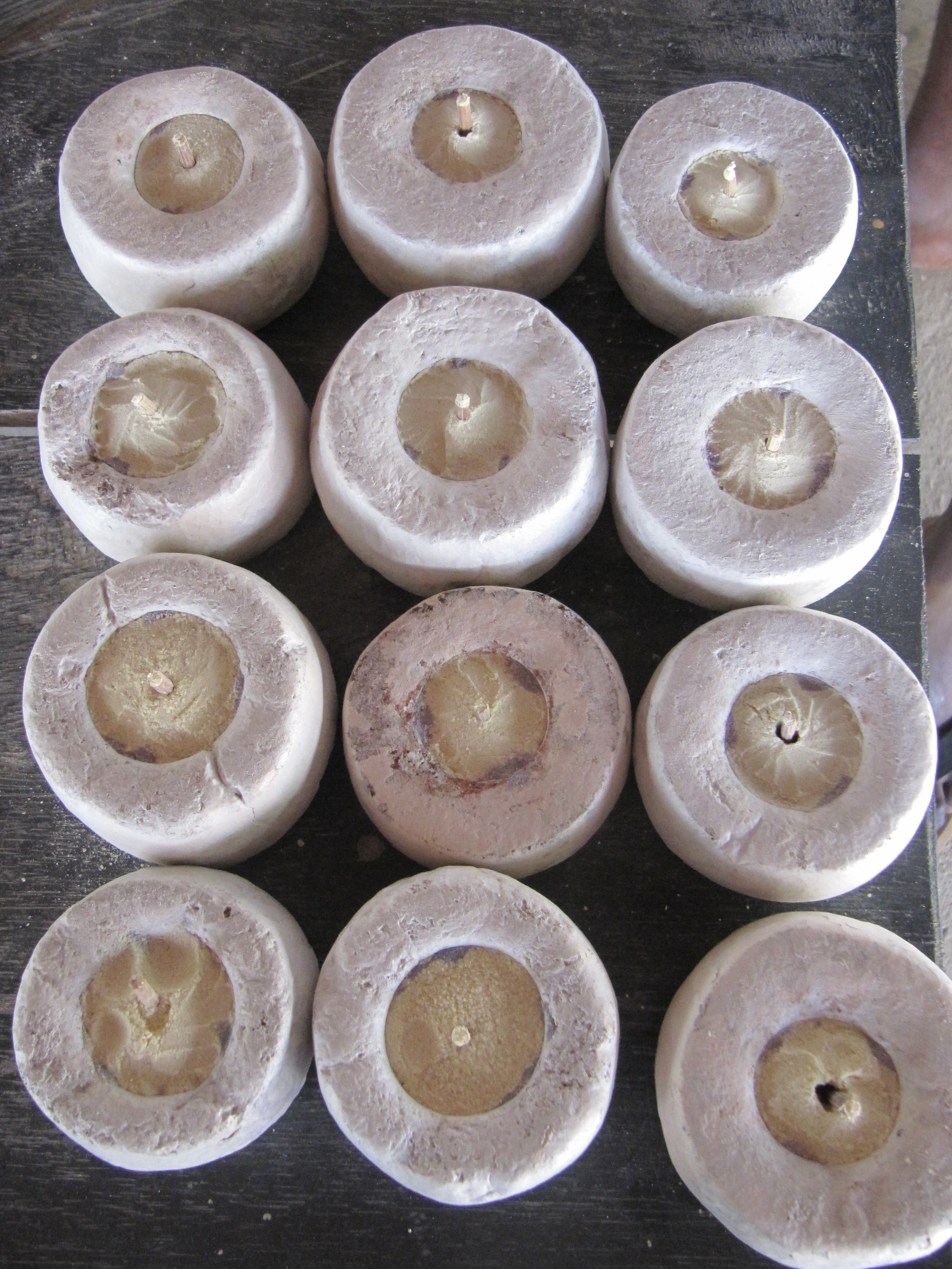
Templates ready for the oven

Powder glass beads are made from finely ground glass, the main source being broken and unusable bottles and a great variety of other scrap glasses. Special types of glass–including cobalt glass medicine bottles, cold cream jars, and many other types of glasses from plates, ashtrays, window panes, and more–are occasionally bought new, just for the purpose of making powder glass beads. These glasses, when pulverized or fragmented and made into beads, yield particularly bright colours and shiny surfaces. Modern ceramic colourants, finely ground broken beads, or shards of different coloured glasses from various sources can be added to create a wide variety of styles, designs, and decorative patterns in many different colours. In addition, glass bead fragments of varying sizes, which have traditionally been used for the manufacture as well as for the decoration of specific types of beads, can now be found in interesting new combinations, and during the past few years in particular, bead makers have taken this tradition yet another step forward by using whole small beads for making their colourful bead creations.

== Types of beads ==
=== Krobo beads ===
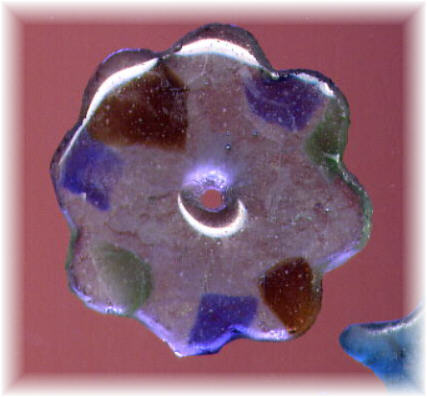
Krobo bead (fused glass fragments)

Krobo powder glass beads are made in vertical molds fashioned out of a special, locally dug clay. Most molds have a number of depressions, designed to hold one bead each, and each of these depressions, in turn, has a small central depression to hold the stem of a cassava leaf. The mold is filled with finely ground glass that can be built up in layers in order to form sequences and patterns of different shapes and colours. The technique could be described as being somewhat similar to creating a sand "painting" or to filling a bottle with different-coloured sands and is called the "vertical-mold dry powder glass technique". When cassava leaf stems are used, these will burn away during firing and leave the bead perforation. Certain powder glass bead variants, however, receive their perforations after firing, by piercing the still hot and pliable glass with a hand-made, pointed metal tool. Firing takes place in clay kilns until the glass fuses.

There are three distinct styles of modern Krobo powder glass beads:

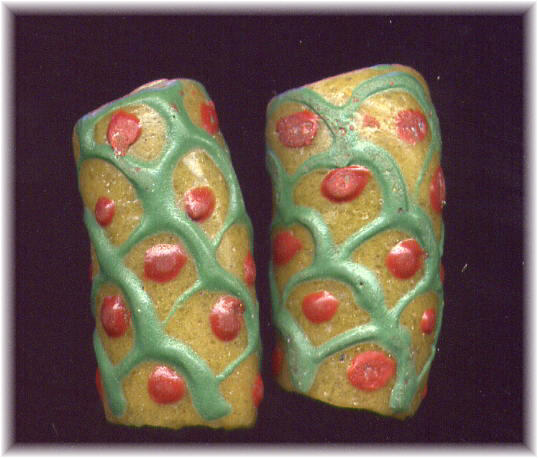
Krobo "Writing" beads

Fused glass fragment beads are made by fusing together fairly large bottle glass or glass bead fragments. These beads are translucent or semi-translucent and receive their perforations, as well as their final shapes, after firing.

Beads composed of two halves (usually bicones, or occasionally spheres) are created from pulverized glass. The two halves are being joined together in a second, short firing process.

The "Mue ne Angma", or "Writing Beads", are conventional powder glass beads made from finely ground glass, with glass slurry decorations that are "written" on and fused in a second firing.

=== Akoso beads ===
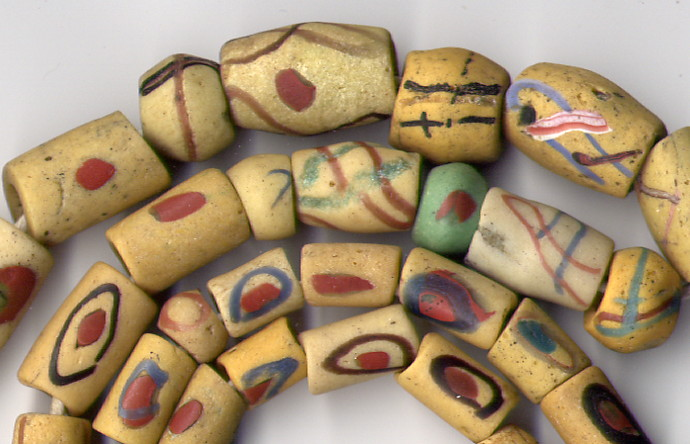
Akoso beads

Akoso beads are older Ghanaian dry core powder glass beads. They date from the 1950s and were manufactured by the Krobo. The most common colour of Akoso beads is yellow. There are also green, and rarely blue or black specimens. The glass surface is often worn away at the ends and around the beads' equator, exposing a grey core. The most prevalent decorations, preformed from strips of hot glass, were applied in patterns of criss-crossed loops, longitudinal stripes, and circles. Glass from crushed Venetian beads was used for making the glass powder, and the decorative patterns were made of glass derived from Venetian beads, or from small whole Venetian beads such as so-called green heart and white-heart beads.

=== Meteyi beads ===
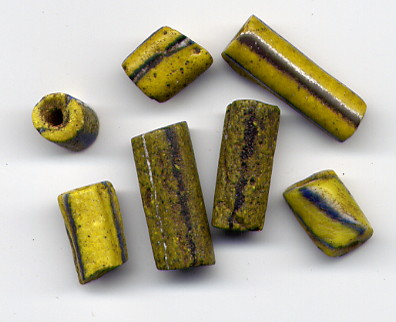
Ashanti, Meteyi beads

Meteyi beads were made by the Ashanti people of Ghana. Longitudinal seams that can often be observed on these beads give evidence that they were made in horizontal molds. Meteyi beads are often ellipsoid in cross section and they have a rough surface on the side which touched the bottom of the mold during firing. They can be opaque yellow, and more rarely, green, blue or white, with stripe decorations in combinations of blue, yellow, white or red. Manufacture ceased during the 1940s.

=== Ateyun beads ===
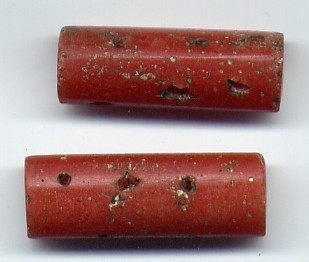
Yoruba, Ateyun beads

Another West African people known to produce powder glass beads are the Yoruba from Nigeria. Beads from their production differ technically from typical Ghanaian powder glass beads in that they are not made in molds and in the wet-core technique. Finely crushed glass is moistened with water and shaped by hand. The perforations are made before the beads are fired, using a pointed tool. Ateyun beads were made in different shapes but always in red, to imitate real Mediterranean coral. Genuine coral was rare, but very much sought after and highly valued by the Yoruba people. Yoruba bead makers made their own imitations at more affordable prices.

=== Keta awuazi beads ===
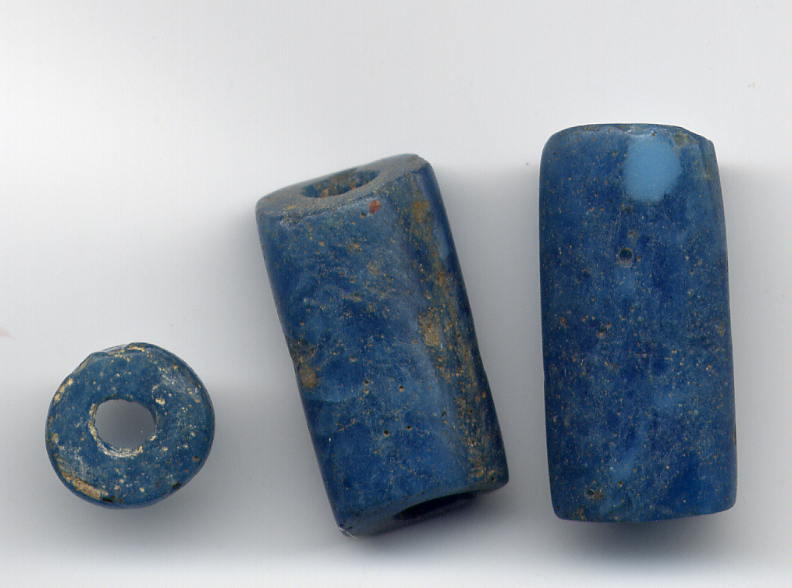
Yoruba, Keta awuazi beads

Apart from red beads imitating coral, blue beads were also highly valued. Keta awuazi beads, originating from Nigeria or possibly Togo, were made in horizontal molds and mold marks are often evident along their sides. Keta awuazi beads are cylindrical in shape. Manufacture ceased during the 1940s. Krobo bead makers produced similar blue powder glass beads, using glass derived from cold cream jars to achieve the blue colouration.

=== Kiffa beads ===
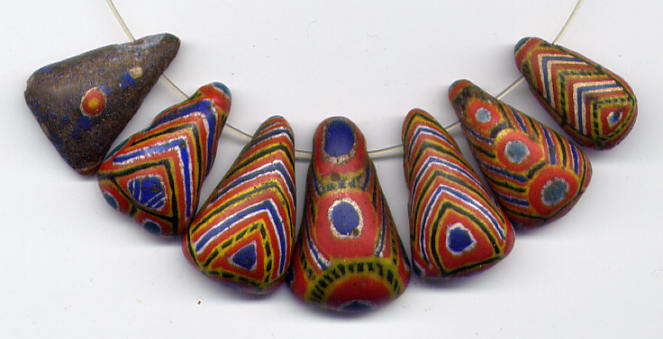
Mauritanian Kiffa beads

Kiffa beads from Mauritania are also manufactured through the wet core technique. Glass is finely crushed to a powder, and is then mixed with a binder such as saliva or gum arabic diluted in water. Decorations are made from the glass slurry (which is made of crushed glass mixed with a binder), and applied with a pointed tool, usually a steel needle. The beads are formed by hand and not placed in molds. The firing takes place in small containers, often sardine cans, in open fires.
