= Chief's Beads =

Beads historically used in North American trading

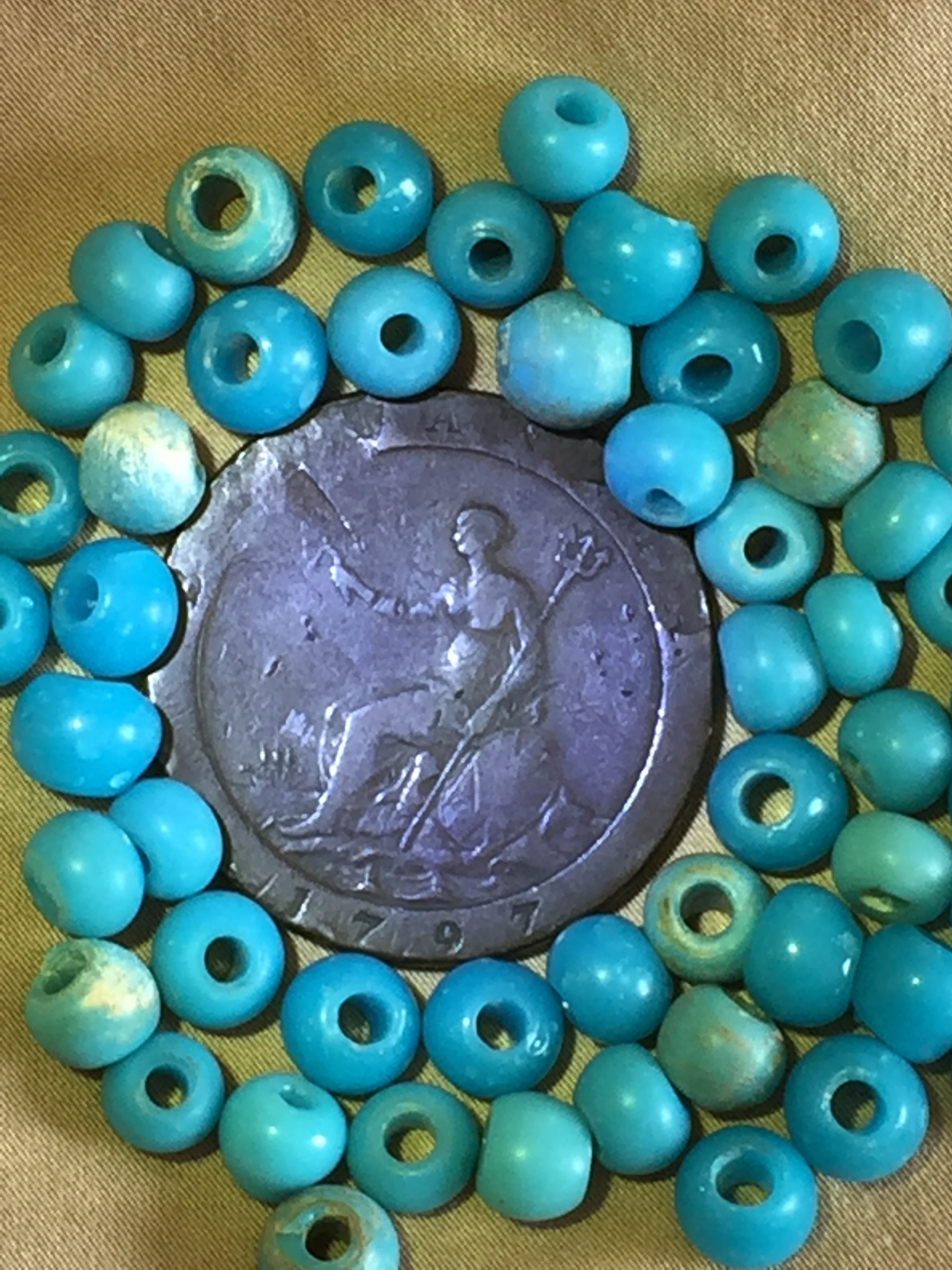
An example of a Chief's bead.

The Chief's bead, named "ti-a, co-mo-shack" by North American Natives, are blue glass trade beads used during the late 18th century and early 19th century up and down the West coast of North America and the Columbia River Basin. The Chief's beads were sought by Native American tribes in preference over beads of other colors because they were blue. An indication of the importance of the blue Chief's bead was that after the Lewis and Clark Expedition returned from their 1803–1806 expedition of discovery to find a route from Missouri to the Pacific Ocean, the leader Captain Meriwether Lewis stated that if he were to return, he would make the blue bead half to two-thirds of his trading goods.

The Chief's bead was about the size of a currant or large pea and seldom perfectly round. They were normally 2 or 3 carats in size. The beads were measured at 50 to 70 against the weight of the English Soho Mint penny, close to the modern ounce and were traded by the fathom or by the yard.

== Types of manufacturing ==
There were three types of Chief's beads manufactured: reed-wound beads from China, furnace-wound beads from Bavaria, and wire-wound beads from numerous other locations.

=== Reed wound beads ===
These beads were a cottage industry in China. Reeds would be soaked in a clay slurry. Two individuals would rotate the reed and another person would trail the hot glass over the reed. The hot beads and reed would be laid in a clay bed to cool. When cool, they would be stripped from the reeds. This method of manufacture was used as far back as the eighth century CE until the late 1930s.

=== Furnace wound beads ===
These beads were manufactured primarily in Bavaria. An iron rod, covered with a kaolin clay bead release, was dipped into the molten glass. The workmen would then separate small quantities of glass and form them into beads, which they slid down the length of the rod. The bead would be slid off into a warmer to anneal and cool. This type of work possibly started as early as the eighth century CE. and was still being done in 1969.

=== Wire wound or out of furnace wound beads ===
This is the original, and by far the oldest method of winding a bead on a mandrel. The mandrel can be used to dip a small amount of melted glass from the melted source and then rolled into a bead. An alternate method is to use two rods, one to dip the glass from the melt, and allow the trail to be wound around the other rod. The rods develop iron oxide from the fire, which gives them a natural release agent for the beads. This often gives the wire wound beads, a dark brown core. This type of manufacture is still occurring.

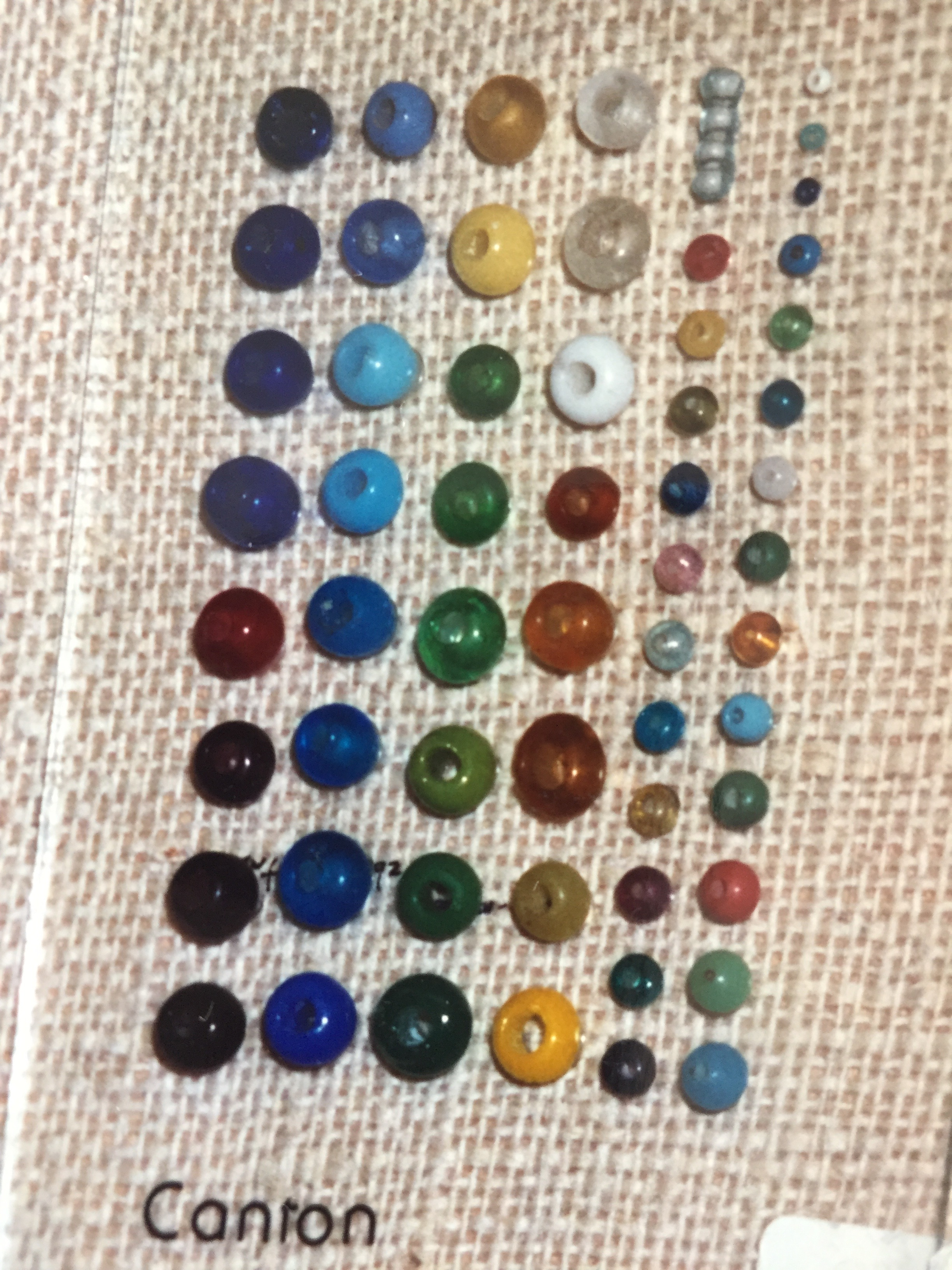
Reed-wound beads.

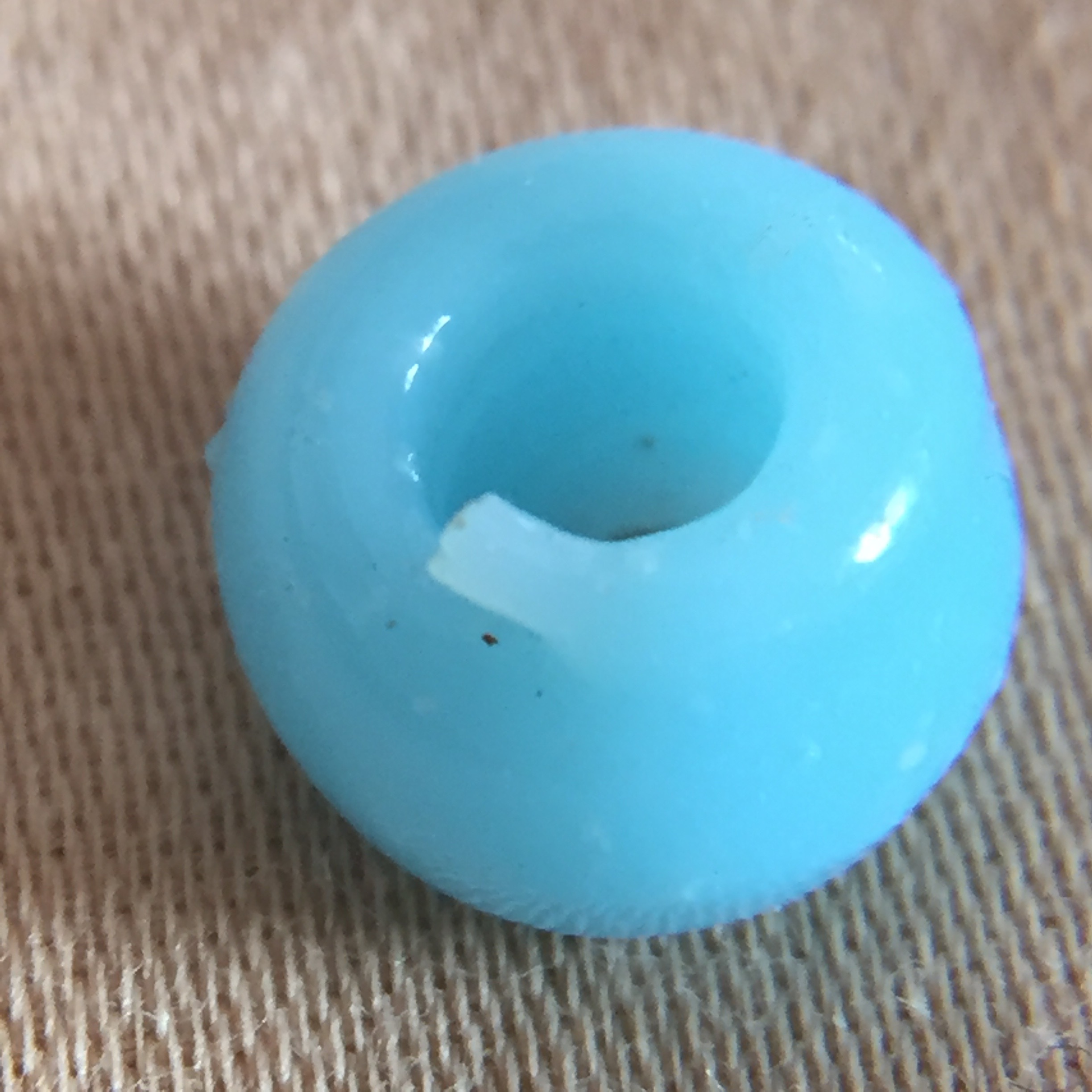
Example of a furnace wound bead.

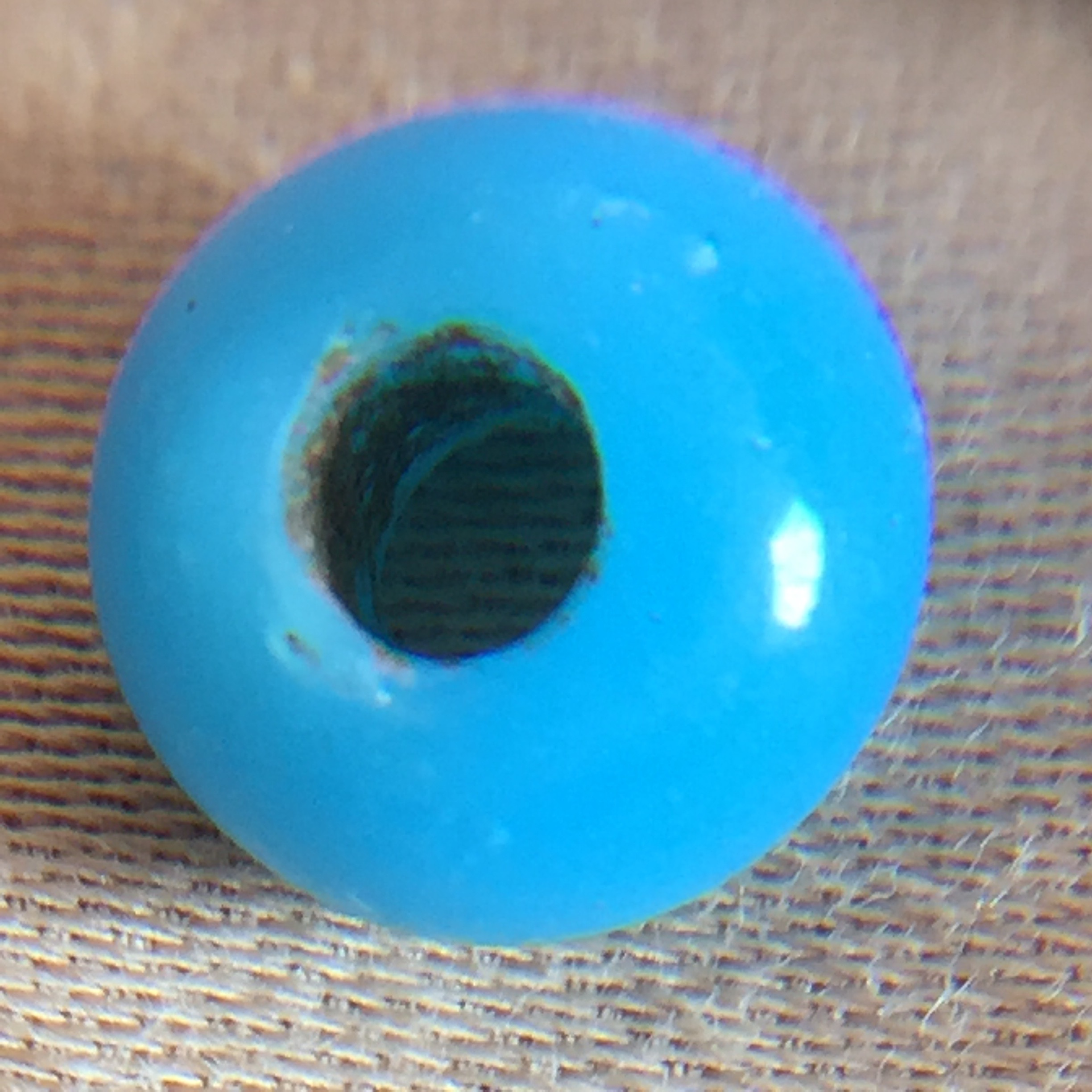
Example of a wire-wound bead.
