= Glass bead road surface marking =

Reflective road paint

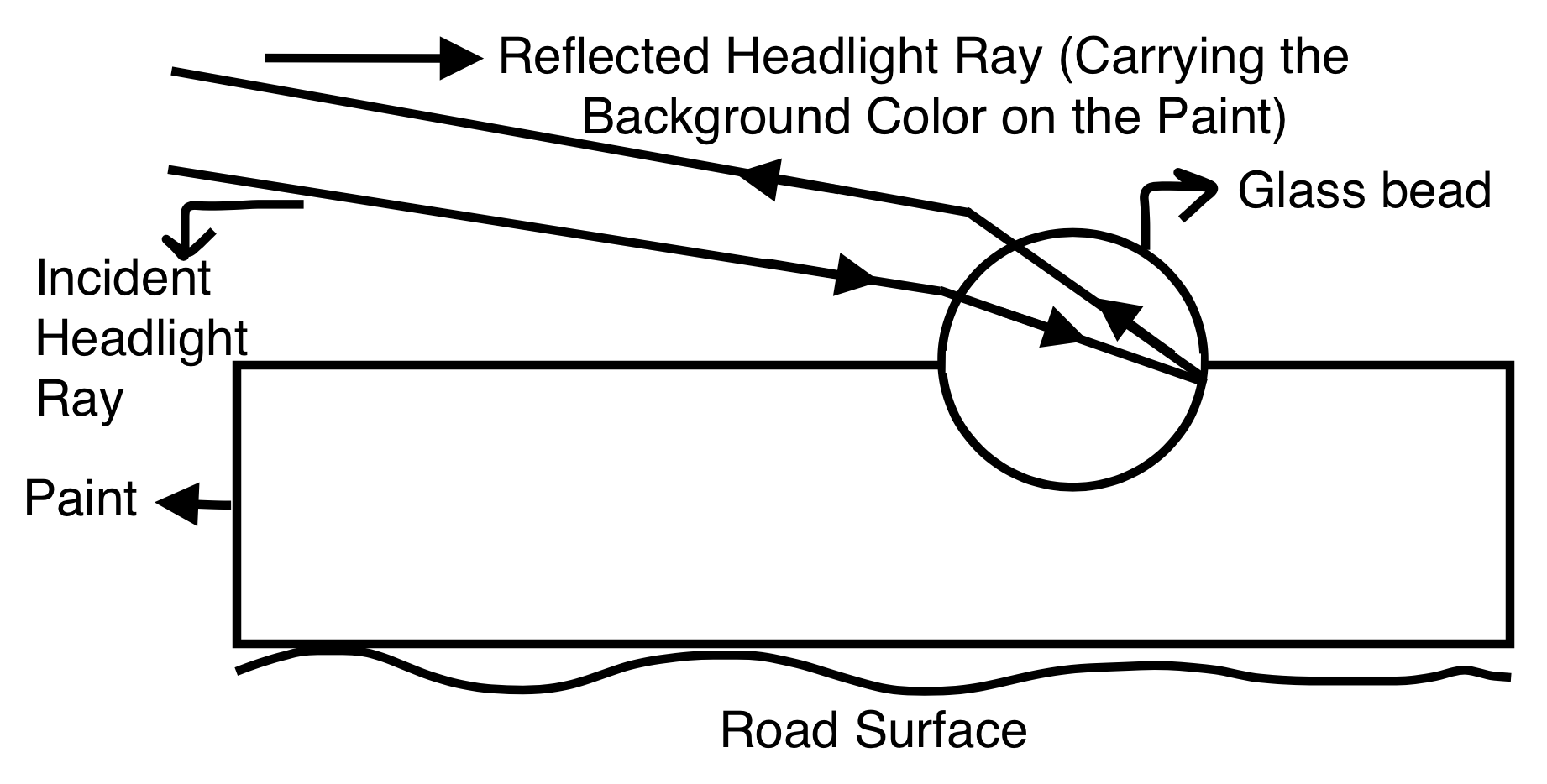
Incident light is refracted within glass beads on road surfaces and reflected into the driver's field of view.

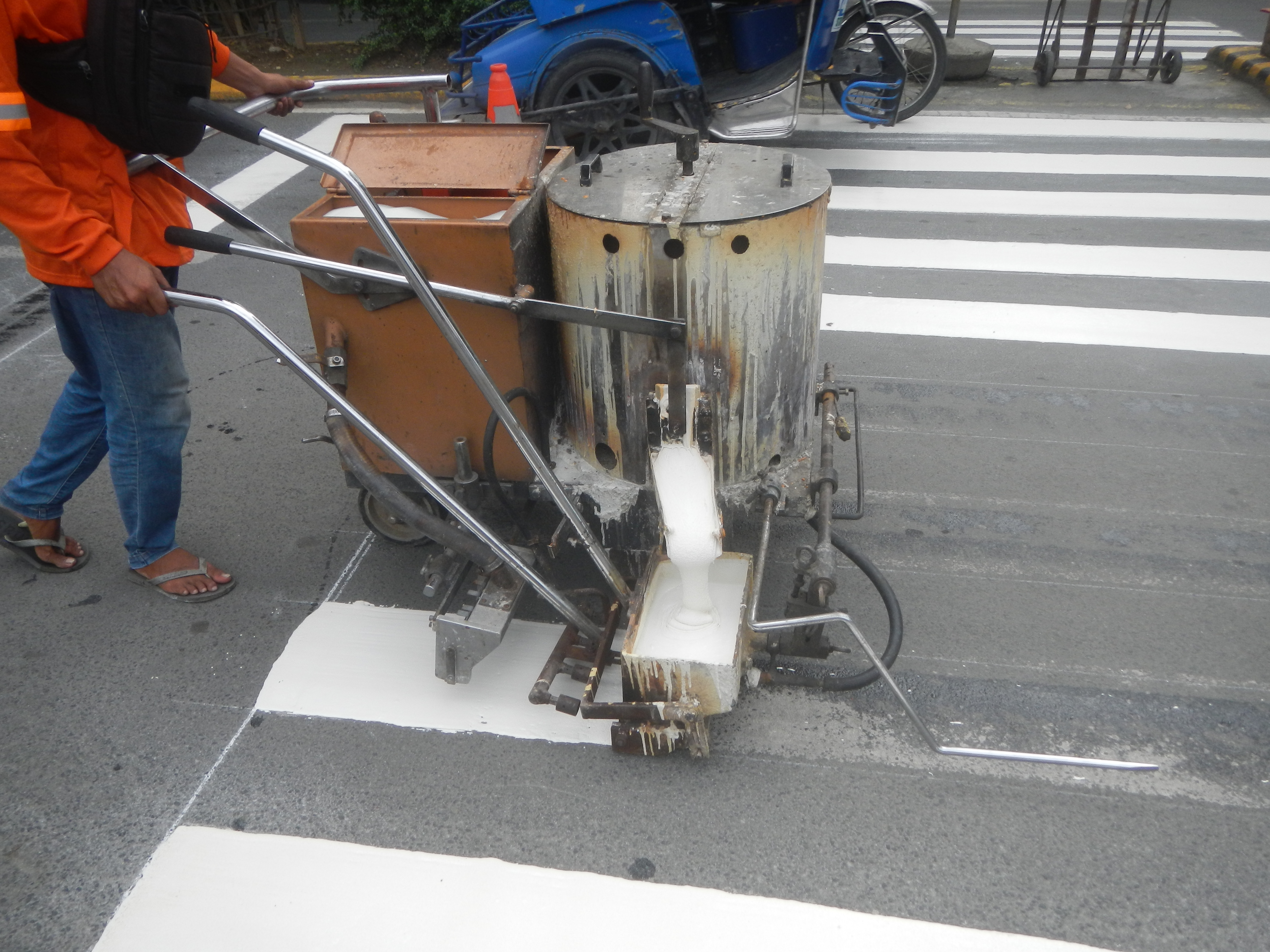
Road paint with reflective glass beads being applied to a pedestrian crossing in Baliuag, Bulacan

Glass beads composed of soda lime glass are essential for providing retroreflectivity of road markings. Retroreflectivity occurs when incident light from vehicles is refracted within glass beads that are embedded in road surface markings and then reflected back into the driver's field of view. In North America, approximately 227 million kilograms (500 million lb) of glass beads were used for road surface markings annually in the 2010s. Roughly 520 kilograms (1,150 lb) of glass beads are used per mile during remarking of a five-lane highway system; typically in Europe, the glass beads are spread at 0.4 kg/m² of marked surface.

The massive demand for glass beads has led to importing from countries that used outdated manufacturing regulations and techniques. Consequently, glass beads contaminated with toxic elements found their way to the markets.

In the past, heavy metals such as arsenic, antimony, and lead were added during the manufacturing process as decolourizers and refining agents. It has been found that these toxic elements incorporated into the glass matrix may leach to the environment.

To ensure that glass beads used for road marking (pavement markings/traffic paints) remain free from harmful elements, regulations were set in many countries. Consequently, contaminated glass beads were eliminated from the market. Recent analyses performed in Europe showed that glass beads used for road markings, from several manufacturers worldwide, were depleted of the harmful elements such as lead, arsenic, antimony, cadmium, chromium, and mercury., Glass beads collected from the environment were not contaminated. >,

== Composition and manufacturing ==
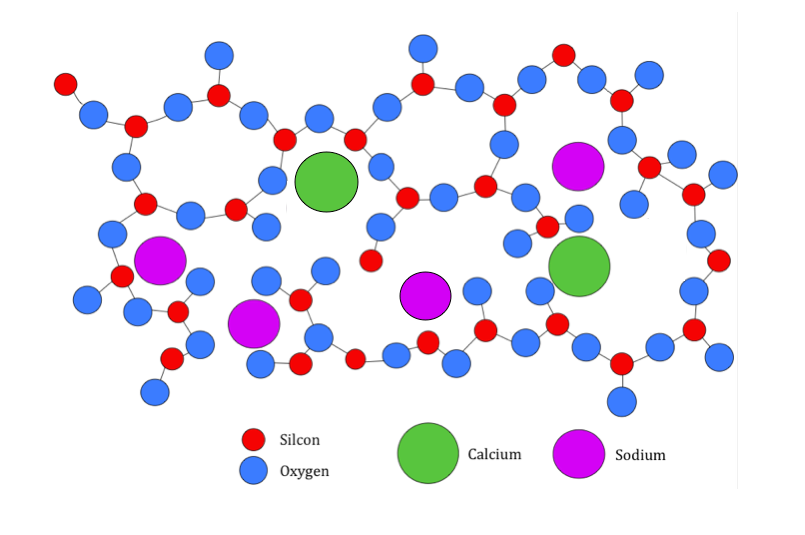
Structure of glass bead matrix and interactions with metal ions.

The majority of glass beads for road markings and other industrial usage (such as blasting, peening, filtration, and filling of plastic composites) are made from crushed recycled float glass in special vertical furnaces, where at about 1300 °C the irregular shards melt and within milliseconds acquire a round shape. The preparation of such glass beads can also be done using virgin glass melts. In such case, the synthesis begins when calcium carbonate is heated to 800–1300$^\circ$C. This heating causes a decomposition reaction which forms solid calcium oxide and releases carbon dioxide gas.

$\ce{CaCO3 ->[{800-1300C}]{CaO(s)} + CO2(g)}$

Similarly, sodium carbonate decomposes to sodium oxide and releases carbon dioxide gas.

$\ce{Na2CO3 -> [{800-1300C}] {Na2O(s)} + CO2(g)}$

Sodium oxide is then reacted with silica to produce sodium silicate liquid glass.

$\ce{{Na2O(s)}+SiO2(s) -> Na2SiO3(l)}$

Lastly, to complete the general structure of the soda-lime glass, calcium oxide is dissolved in solution with sodium silicate glass, which ultimately reduces the softening temperature of the glass. Additional metals and ions are added to this melted glass to improve its properties, and the compound is then sprayed and formed into beads using either the direct or indirect method.

$\ce{{Na2SiO3(l)}+ CaO(s) -> Na2O*CaO*SiO2}$

Overall, the percent composition of major compounds found in the final glass beads with a refractive index of 1.5 made from virgin raw materials is shown below. Essentially the same composition has glass beads prepared from recycled float glass.

Compound	% Composition
$\ce{SiO2}$	70-75%
$\ce{Na2O}$	11-15%
$\ce{MgO}$	2-4%
$\ce{CaO}$	6-10%
$\ce{Al2O}$	1-2%

In addition to these primary components of soda-lime glass, manufacturers used to include, before the standards and regulations were imposed and enforced, the heavy metals arsenic, antimony, and lead to refine and improve the properties. Lead in the form of PbO is added to increase the durability of the glass to withstand harsh road conditions. Arsenic and antimony are used as fining agents that facilitate the removal of gas bubbles from the molten mixture. Carbon dioxide produced by the decomposition of calcium carbonate and sodium carbonate is removed to obtain the required retroreflective properties of the glass. In addition, both arsenic and antimony are used as decolorizers. Having a colorless glass is crucial to maximizing retroreflectivity. Arsenic in its inorganic form assists in the decolorization of the glass by controlling iron's oxidation state. Arsenic oxidizes ferrous oxide to its less colorful counterpart, ferric oxide.

$\ce{{As2O5}+4Fe3O4->{As2O3} + 6Fe2O3}$ With the ban on arsenic, antimony, lead, and other undesired elements in glass beads, raw materials of much higher quality, devoid of undesired contamination that could cause discolouration, are now used.

Antimony in the form of Sb_{2}O_{5} performs a similar reaction as arsenic, oxidizing ferrous oxide to ferric oxide.

$\ce{{Sb2O5} + 4Fe3O4 -> {Sb2O3}+6Fe2O3}$

According to the US Environmental Protection Agency, the Resource Conservation and Recovery Act limits the levels of heavy metal content in accordance with their toxicity. It was reported that between 2008 and 2015 these three heavy metals were found in glass beads imported to the United States and to Brazil from countries with little to no regulation on heavy metal content, but also were identified in domestic production in varying concentration.

For example, beads obtained from North America were reported to contain approximately 15 mg of arsenic per kg of beads, while some from China had concentrations of up to 1000 mg/kg. Concentrations of each of these metals and the comparison between the old and new reports are listed in the table below.

Analysis of contaminated samples, done in North America in 2008-2015
Metal/Metalloid	Concentration (mg/kg)
$\ce{As}$	103-683
$\ce{Pb}$	23-179
$\ce{Sb}$	62-187

Contents of metals and metalloids in glass beads [mg/kg]; analyses of European samples, done in 2021–2022.
Material	Chromium	Arsenic	Cadmium	Antimony	Mercury	Lead
Glass beads from recycled float glass – for road marking	14.0(2.0)^{(b)}	1.0(0.0)	<0.10	3.1(0.2)	<0.10	3.5(0.1)
Glass beads from virgin melt, refractive index 1.5	4.5(0.2)	0.45(0.02)	<0.10	3.9(0.2)	<0.10	18.0(1.0)
Glass beads from virgin melt, refractive index 1.7	3.2(0.4)	0.24(0.01)	0.16(0.01)	0.65(0.01)	<0.10	0.56(0.02)
Glass beads from virgin melt, refractive index 1.9	4.3(0.2)	1.2(0.1)	0.13(0.01)	2.3(0.2)	<0.10	1.2(0.2)
Glass beads from recycled float glass – for peening	4.7(0.4)	4.5(0.2)	0.23(0.02)	5.9(0.4)	<0.05	23(1)
Glass beads from recycled float glass – for filtration	23(1)^{(d)}	4.7(0.2)	0.13(0.01)	16(1)	<0.05	37(2)

^{(a)} Standard deviations from three determinations are provided in parentheses. ^{(b)} The analysis for content of Cr(VI) resulted in no detection above 0.1 mg/kg. ^{(c)} Sample could not be fully digested. ^{(d)}Analysis for Cr(VI) was not done and is not required for this type of GB.

== Degradation of glass beads ==
Environmental conditions can cause degradation of glass beads, leading to the release of incorporated heavy metals into the environment. While abrasion may dislodge these beads from the road marking itself, the reaction of these beads with an aqueous environment vastly accelerates their decomposition and heavy metal release. Hence, the current regulations limit the contents of these elements to <150 mg/kg (or to <50 mg/kg per Australian standard) are very important.

There are three reactions involved in the corrosion of silicon dioxide. The first is an ion exchange reaction, in which mobile ions of a solution are exchanged for those of similar charge on the solid. Particularly, this reaction involves a cation exchange material, where a negatively charged structural backbone allows the replacement of positively charged cations. This reaction involved in the degradation of soda lime beads shows various ions that are interaction with the silicon-oxygen network (e.g. $\ce{Na+}$, $\ce{Ca^2+}$, $\ce{K+}$, $\ce{Mg^2+}$) being replaced with a hydrogen ion.

$\ce{{{Si-O^-} Na+} + ({H^+} + OH^-) -> {Si-OH} + {Na+} +OH-}$

In addition to this reaction, a hydroxyl ion can attack the $\ce{Si-O}$ bond, causing dissolution of the $\ce{SiO2}$ matrix and creating silanol and non-bridging oxygen groups.

$\ce{{Si-O-Si} + {OH^-} -> {Si-OH} + {^-O-Si}}$

As dissolution occurs, the non-bridging oxygen groups can abstract hydrogen ions from solution.

$\ce{{Si-O^-} + ({H^+} + OH^-) -> {Si-OH}+{OH^-}}$

An increase in the concentration of hydroxyl ions comes with increased alkalinity of the aqueous solution. This increase in pH has shown, in varying column leaching studies, to increase the reduction potential and DOC (dissolved organic carbon) concentration of the solution. This ultimately leads to an increase in mobility of many metals including arsenic, copper, and nickel.

The mobility of these heavy metals is therefore affected by the presence of alkali oxides. The $\ce{Na+}$, $\ce{Ca^2+}$, $\ce{Mg^2+}$, and $\ce{K+}$ ions can associate with the tetrahedral networks of silicon and oxygen, forming a trigonal antiprism network. In trigonal antiprism formation, the ions coordinate with three oxygen atoms at a distance of 2.3 angstroms and then another three oxygen atoms at a nonbonding distance of 3 angstroms. As the concentration of alkali oxides increases in metal beads, the probability of chemical attack increases due to the more open and accessible glass chemical network and structure.

=== Heavy metal speciation and leaching ===
During both routine road marking removal and harsh environmental conditions, degradation of contaminated glass can cause leach of the incorporated heavy metals. Environmental conditions relevant to road surfaces, such as pH, different salts, and ionic strength, strongly influence the leaching process. In particular, pH determines the speciation of the heavy metal, which is critical for solubility in the aqueous phase. The following graphs show the speciation of heavy metals as a function of pH.

Heavy metal speciation by pH
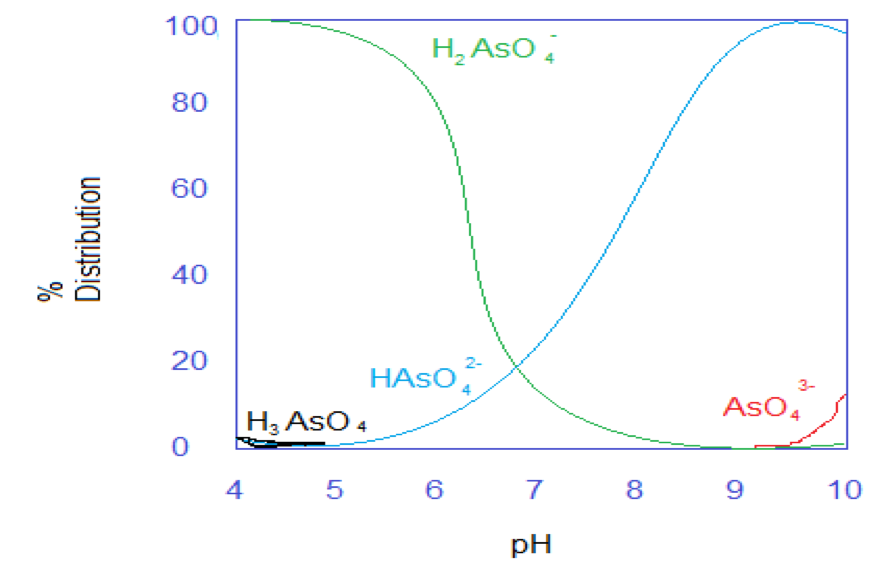
The predominant arsenic species leaches under high pH as $\ce{HAsO4^2-}$.
Dissociation constant: See Arsenic Acid properties.

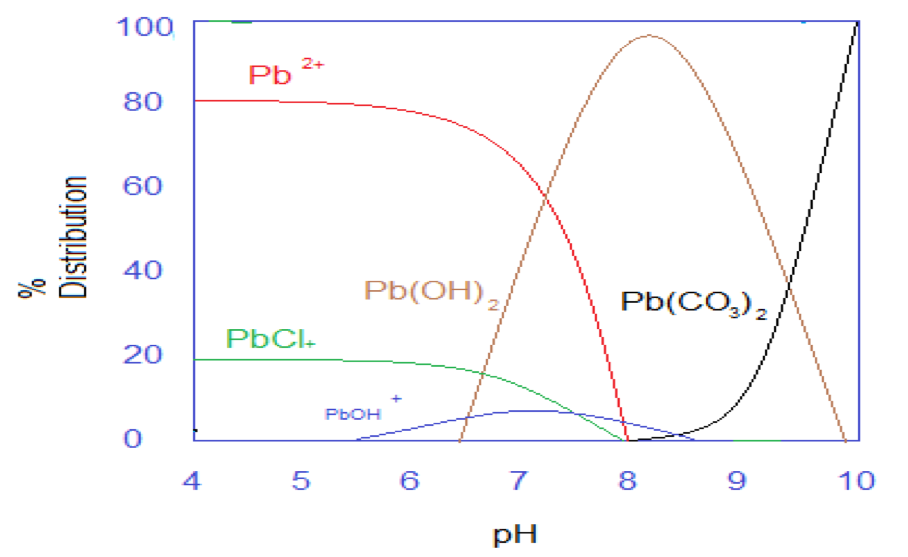
The predominant lead species leaches under low pH as $\ce{Pb^2+}$.
Pb(OH)_{2}$\ce{<->}$ Pb^{2+}(aq) + 2OH^{−}(aq) : Ksp = 2.8* 10^{−16}

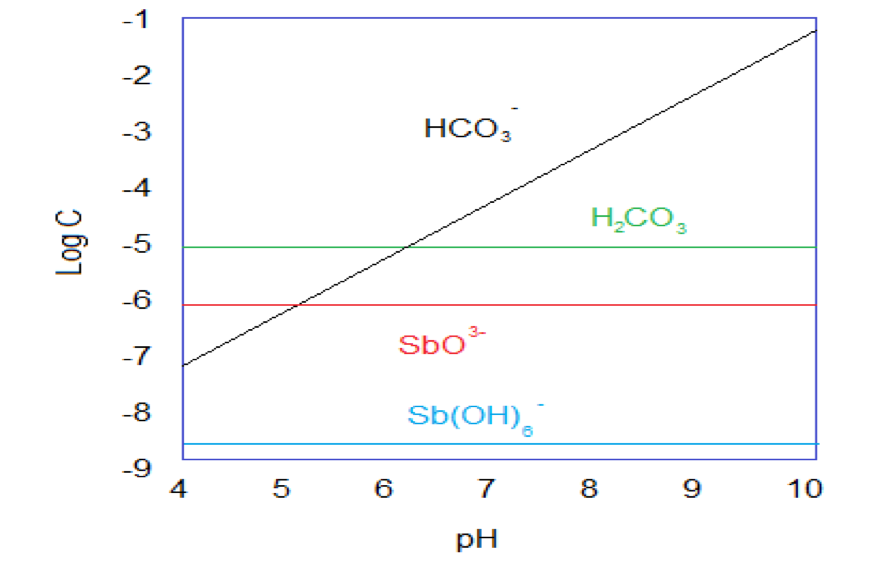
Antimony does not show great pH dependence. The predominant leached species is the $\ce{Sb(V)}$ form.
Sb(V) solubility = 20g/L

Few U.S. states have regulations on leached concentrations of heavy metals. For example, New Jersey limits arsenic to 3 μg/L, lead to 65 μg/L, and antimony to 78 μg/L. In studies that subjected batches of glass beads to environmental conditions in a lab setting, 96% of the leached concentrations of arsenic exceeded 3 μg/L, 75% of the leached lead exceeded 65 μg/L, and 27% of the leached concentrations of antimony exceeded the criterion of 78 μg/L. The following graphs show the total concentrations of heavy metals leached from glass beads after 160 days as a function of pH, salt type, and ionic strength.

Leached concentration after 10 days wrt environmental factor; dotted line indicates New Jersey limits.
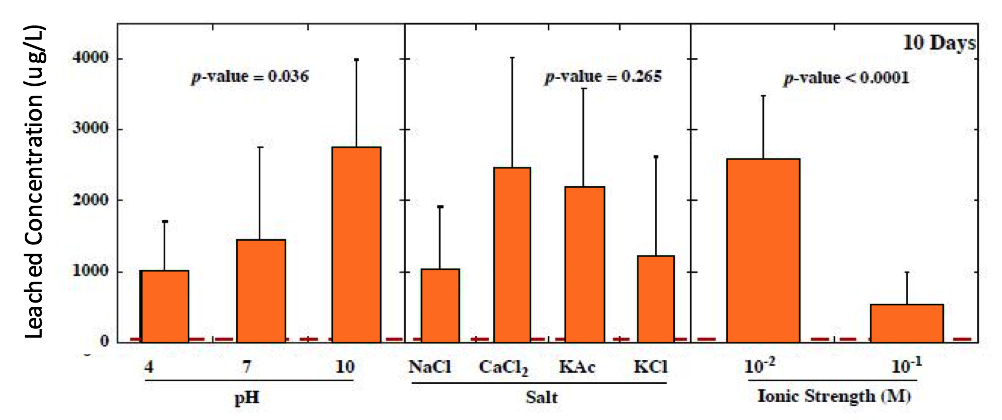
Arsenic leached concentrations are significantly higher with low ionic strength and chloride salts. No significant difference based on pH.

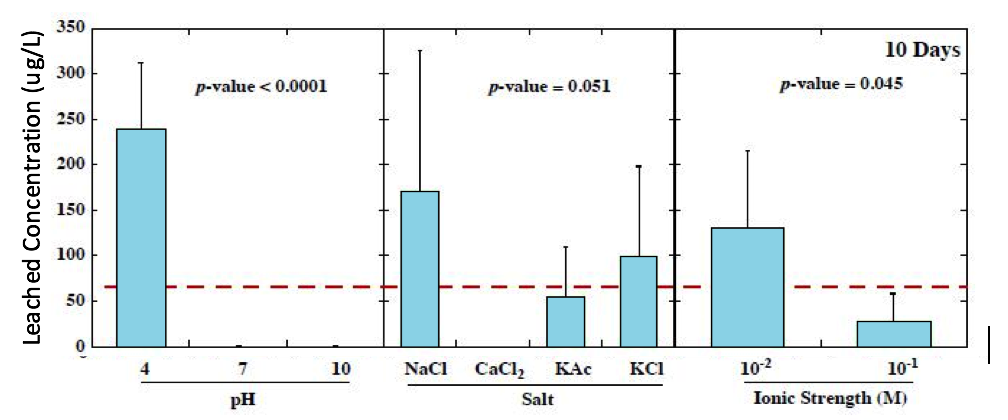
Lead leached concentrations significantly higher at low pH, low ionic strength, and chloride salts.

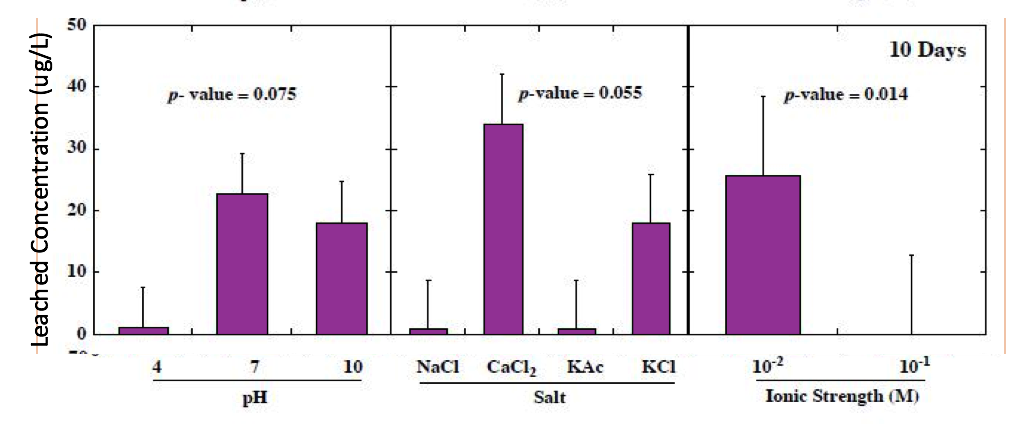
Antimony leached concentrations are significantly higher at low ionic strength. No significant difference based on pH or type of salt.

=== Interaction with roadside soil ===
Once the arsenic is mobilized in aqueous form, humic substances interact with arsenic. It has been shown that, particularly under acidic environments, humic acids contribute immensely to the retention of arsenic in the soil matrix. While an exact mechanism for this has not been confirmed, it has been hypothesized that humic acids are acting as anion exchange moieties, potentially through amine interaction within the humic material with arsenic. This is only likely if the amine is quaternary, thus justifying the low pH claim, as similar resins are used to separate As(III) and As(V). Another possible mechanism of arsenic's interaction with humic substances is through metal complexes. Potentially, arsenic adsorption could occur as a humic-acid-metal-As bridging ligand, or possibly adsorbed to the clay that is bound to the humic acid itself as well.

Lead, on the other hand, has been shown to increase binding to humic substances with increasing pH and decreasing ionic strength. Research has indicated that monodentate lead binds at a relatively high measure to carboxylic type groups present in humic materials. There is also evidence of the bidentate form of lead binding to phenolic-type groups in the ortho position in humic material when concentrations of lead are high, as is the case for soils near marked roads.

In the case of antinomy, qualitative studies on its association with humic substances is scarce and rarely conclusive. It has been shown in many cases, however, that pH has little indication on these interactions. One study indicated that organic ligands that possess carboxylic groups or hydroxyl groups create stable bidentate chelates in their speciation as As(III) and As(V). Another indicated that As(III) when bound to humic material, is easily oxidized and can be released back into aqueous solution as (SbOH)6-, thus showing that As(V) is more commonly bound to humic material. The details of how this binding occurs mechanistically remain relatively unresolved, but knowledge of the primary form of its binding is important to furthering this research.

== Alternative to heavy metal usage ==
Retroreflectivity is essential to safe driving conditions. At present, there are no known feasible alternatives to the use of glass beads. Hence, the use of non-toxic elements and raw materials that can achieve the same results related to the quality of glass beads is essential. These may include zirconium, tungsten, titanium, and barium. The amount of these metals that could be incorporated into the glass varies based on its country of origin and the regulations placed on those countries, but further research on alternatives to heavy metal usage in road markings would assist in reducing heavy metal leachate near roadside soils.

== See also ==
- Road surface marking
- Toxic heavy metal
