= Indo-Pacific beads =

Type of mainly tube drawn glass beads which originated in the Indian subcontinent

Indo-Pacific beads are a type of mainly tube drawn glass beads which originated in the Indian subcontinent but are manufactured widely in Southeast Asia. These are usually 6mm in diameter, undecorated and come in various colours for example green, yellow, black, opaque red, etc.

== Production technique ==
Glass beads are made using three methods, winding, drawing or moulding.

=== Drawn beads ===
In the ancient lada technique, a special furnace and tools are used. A hollow cavity is formed inside the cone of molten glass by pushing an iron tube (the lada) into the mass of molten glass. Then a longer rod, the cheatleak, is put inside the lada and thrust right through the cone. On the opposite side the master craftsman uses a metal hook to grab the tip of the cone and form a tube. He walks back about 5 metres, drops the hook, and during the next three hours or so, two master craftsmen in turn pull out the glass tube by hand, forming a series of tubes approximately one metre long. These are then cut into sharp-edged segments, which are heated in smaller fires to round off the edges.

== Distribution ==
Indo Pacific beads traded widely from East Asia to Africa. They reached Europe in early medieval period. They may have been the single most widely traded item in history.

== History ==
Scholars place the manufacturing of the Indo Pacific beads in South India and Southeast Asia between 500 and 200 BCE.
