= Murano beads =

Glass beads influenced by Venetian glassmakers

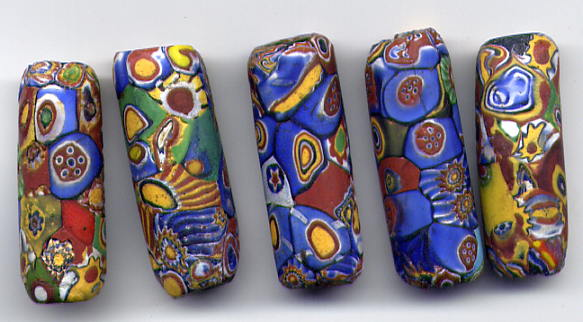
Millefiori beads from Murano

Murano beads are intricate glass beads influenced by Venetian glass artists. Since 1291, Murano glassmakers have refined technologies for producing beads and glasswork such as crystalline glass, enamelled glass (smalto), glass with threads of gold (aventurine), multicolored glass (millefiori), milk glass (lattimo) and imitation gemstones made of glass.

In 2020, the art of glass beads in Italy and France was added to the UNESCO Representative List of the Intangible Cultural Heritage of Humanity.

== Color ==
The process of Murano bead-making begins with the production of color canes. The chemical compounds involved in color fabrication are extremely sensitive so they must be mixed with absolute accuracy. Aquamarine is created through the use of copper and cobalt, and ruby red is achieved through the use of a gold solution as a coloring agent.

== Lampworked beads ==
Most Murano beads are made using an air pump burner lampworking or torch and mandrel technique. Once the mandrel was made by using an iron rod covered with a release material stuck on the top of the rod; now a copper tube has taken its place. The copper tube helps make many other different shapes.

The lamp-work method is the most time-consuming method of glass bead-making, as each bead must be formed individually. Using a torch for heat, Murano glass rods and tubes are heated to a molten state and wrapped around a metal rod until the desired shape is achieved. Several layers of different colored glass, as well as gold and silver leaf, are used to produce the desired effect. After the bead is slowly cooled, it is removed from the rod, resulting in a hole for eventual stringing as jewelry.

Wedding cake beads known as Fiorato (decorated with glass overlays featuring roses, swirls and dots) and Venetian foil beads (with fusion of color, gold and silver foil) are two of the kinds of beads made using the lamp-work method.

== Seedbeads or conterie ==
Seedbeads or conterie are small, round beads. To produce this tiny bead, hollow tubes of colored glass are formed, then chopped and re-fired for smoothness and shade.

== Chevron or Rosetta beads ==
The Chevron bead is distinguished by a red, white and blue zigzag pattern.

== Millefiori or lace beads ==
The abstract millefiori beads are created in a manner similar to that of chevron or rosetta beads. There is a wider use of color and the glass cane is not hollow, but completely solid.

== Blown beads ==
Today this glassblowing is called the Filigrana or filigree method. To produce these beads with stripes of color and spirals, glassmakers lay canes of glass down and pick them up with a blow-pipe.
