= Millefiori =

Glasswork technique

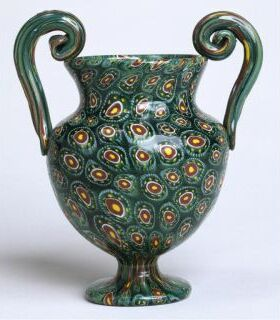
Vase (1872) manufactured by the Venice & Murano Glass & Mosaic Co. (Victoria and Albert Museum)

Millefiori (Italian: [ˌmilleˈfjoːri]) is a glasswork technique which produces distinctive decorative patterns on glassware. The term millefiori is a combination of the Italian words mille (thousand) and fiori (flowers). Apsley Pellatt in his book Curiosities of Glass Making was the first to use the term "millefiori", which appeared in the Oxford English Dictionary in 1849; prior to that, the beads were called mosaic beads. While the use of this technique long precedes the term "millefiori", it is now most frequently associated with Venetian glassware.

Since the late 1980s, the millefiori technique has been applied to polymer clay and other materials. As the polymer clay is quite pliable and does not need to be heated and reheated to fuse it, it is a much easier medium in which to produce millefiori patterns than glass.

== History ==
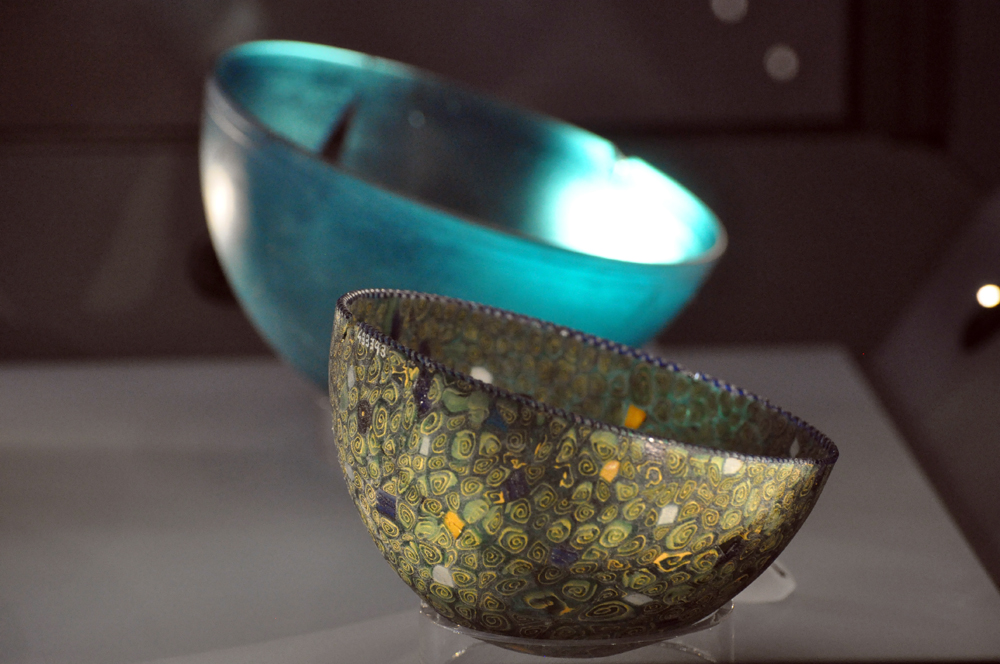
Roman glass cups from the necropolis of Todi, first half of the 2nd century BC

The manufacture of mosaic beads can be traced to Ancient Roman, Phoenician and Alexandrian times. Canes, probably made in Italy, have been found as far away as 8th century archaeological sites in Ireland. Millefiori beads have been uncovered from digs at Sandby borg, Öland, Sweden, dating apparently from the late 5th or early 6th century. A piece of millefiori was found, along with unworked garnets, in a purse at the early 7th-century Anglo-Saxon burial site at Sutton Hoo.

The technical knowledge for creating millefiori was lost by the eighteenth century, and the technique was not revived until the nineteenth century. Within several years of the technique's rediscovery, factories in Italy, France and England were manufacturing millefiori canes. They were often incorporated into fine glass art paperweights.

Until the 15th century, Murano glass makers were only producing drawn Rosetta beads made from molded Rosetta canes. Rosetta beads are made by the layering of a variable number of layers of glass of various colors in a mold, and by pulling the soft glass from both ends until the cane has reached the desired thickness. It is then cut into short segments for further processing.

== Production ==
The millefiori technique involves the production of glass canes or rods, known as murrine, with multicolored patterns which are viewable only from the cut ends of the cane. A murrine rod is heated in a furnace and pulled until thin while still maintaining the cross section's design. It is then cut into beads or discs when cooled.

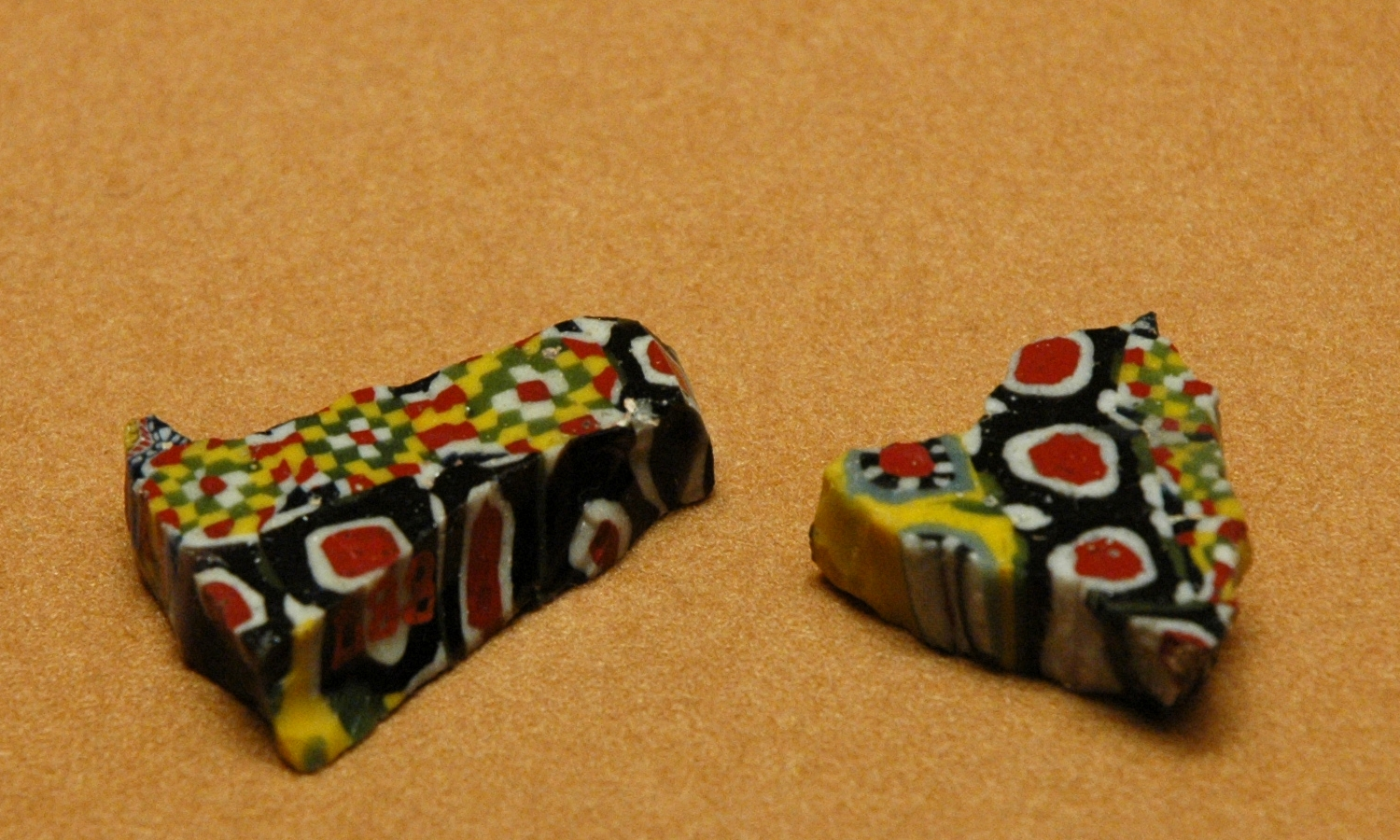
Fragments of tile from the Jawsaq al-Khaqani palace, Abbasid Samarra, Iraq, c. 836 AD

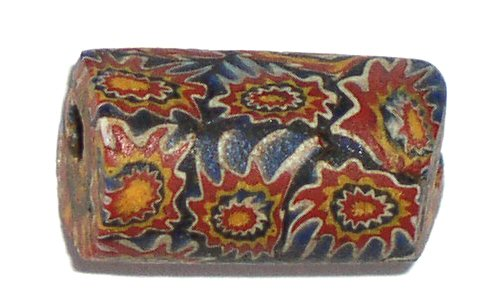
Venetian millefiori bead Murano (1850–1950)

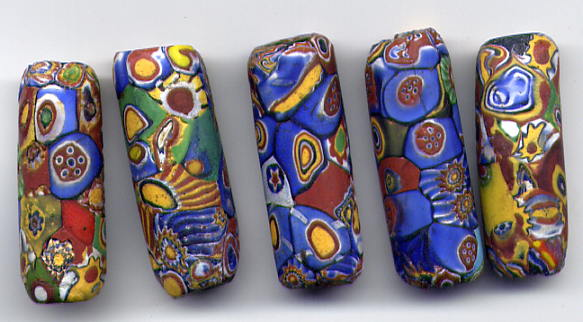
Millefiori beads from Murano, 1920s

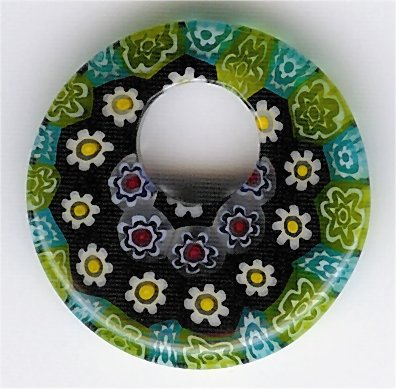
Millefiori glass pendant

== See also ==
- Mille-fleur, a French term used to refer to a background composed of small flowers
- Venetian beads
- Trade beads for the use of millefiori beads in the slave trade
- Glass museums and galleries
- Murrine
- Glass mosaic
