= Kiffa beads =

Mauritanian powder glass beads

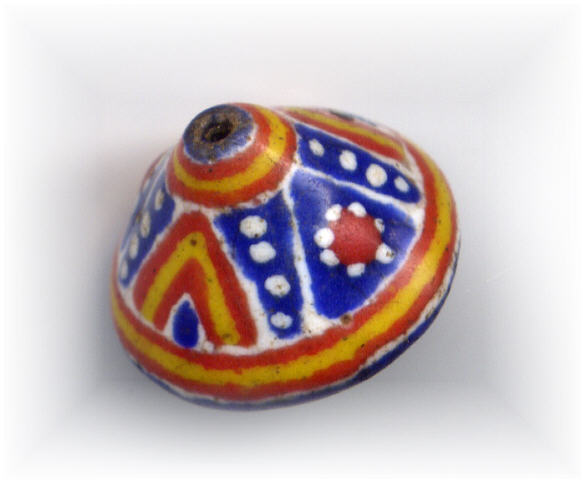
Kiffa bead, cone

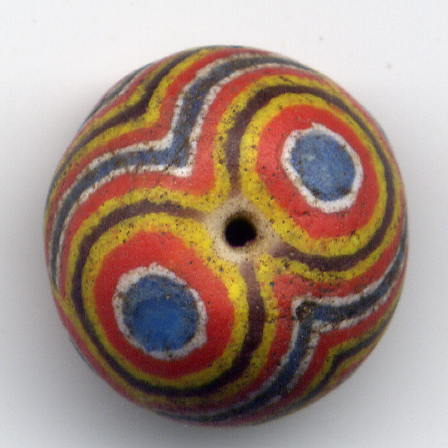
Kiffa bead, sphere

Kiffa beads are rare powder glass beads. They are named after the Mauritanian city of Kiffa, where French ethnologist R. Mauny documented them first in 1949.

Kiffa beads represent one of the highest levels of artistic skill and ingenuity in beadmaking, being manufactured with the simplest materials and tools available: pulverized European glass beads or fragments of them, bottle glass, pottery shards, tin cans, twigs, steel needles, some gum arabic, and open fires. The term Kiffa bead, named after one of the old bead making centres of Kiffa in Mauritania, was coined by United States bead collectors during the 1980s.

According to Peter Francis Jr., the making of powder glass beads in West Africa may date back a few hundred years, and to possibly 1200 CE in Mauritania. Maure powder glass beads are believed to copy older, Islamic beads, of the type made in Fustat and elsewhere. Although the making of Mauritanian powder glass beads appears to be an ancient tradition, no archaeological evidence to establish their age has been found to date.

== Production ==
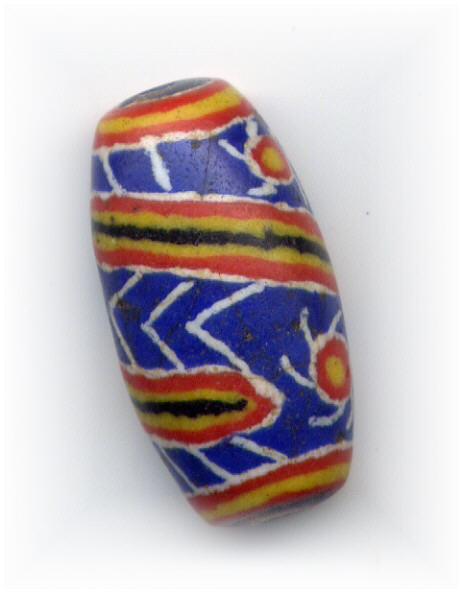
Kiffa bead, cylinder

Glass which is finely crushed to a powder is mixed with a binder such as saliva or gum arabic diluted in water. Decorations are made from the glass slurry i.e. crushed glass mixed with a binder and applied with a pointed tool, usually a steel needle. The beads are placed in small containers, often sardine cans and heated to fuse the glass on open fires without moulds.

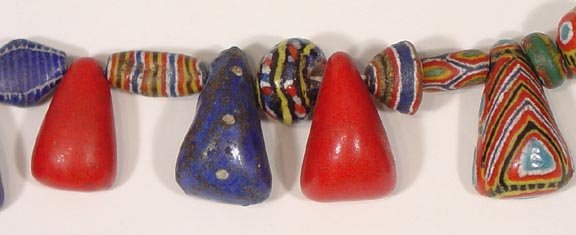
String of Kiffa beads

Kiffa beads were made in various shapes: blue, red, and polychromatic triangles with yellow, black, white, red and blue chevron-type and decorations that resemble eyes; blue, red and polychromatic diamond-shaped beads; cigar shaped and conical beads as well as a variety of small spherical and oblate beads. Colour sequences observed on traditional beads with polychromatic decorations are always the same, i.e. red-yellow-black (dark brown)-yellow-red-white-blue-white. Often the obverse is decorated as well, and it is believed that different bead making families had their own distinct styles. For their wearers, all these beads held amuletic properties. The colours, shapes and the many different intricate decorative patterns all having specific meanings, most of them forgotten today.

== Uses ==
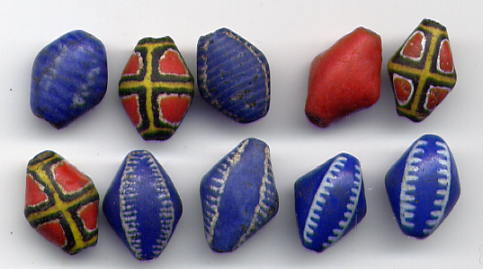
Kiffa beads, diamond-shaped

Diamond-shaped Kiffa beads were traditionally worn on bracelets, sewn onto strips of leather, and arranged in traditional sets composed of a specific ratio of blue to red to polychromatic specimens. Their patterns are believed to protect and to increase the fertility of their wearers and it has been proposed that some might imitate cowrie shells. Triangular-shaped and spherical beads were worn as hair ornaments and traditional assemblages could be composed of two complementary sets of three triangulars each, one blue, one red and one polychromatic, worn at temple height. Many of the small spherical or oblate-shaped beads were hair ornaments or worn in necklaces in various combinations with other glass and stone beads and were made by decorating a red, blue or white preformed glass bead "core". Glass slurry decorations were applied to moulded 19th-century beads possibly of Czech origin. Smaller, cigar shaped or cylindrical beads are often also found to have been constructed from two or even three of the moulded beads. These are fragile and tend to break apart easily.

== Modern beads ==
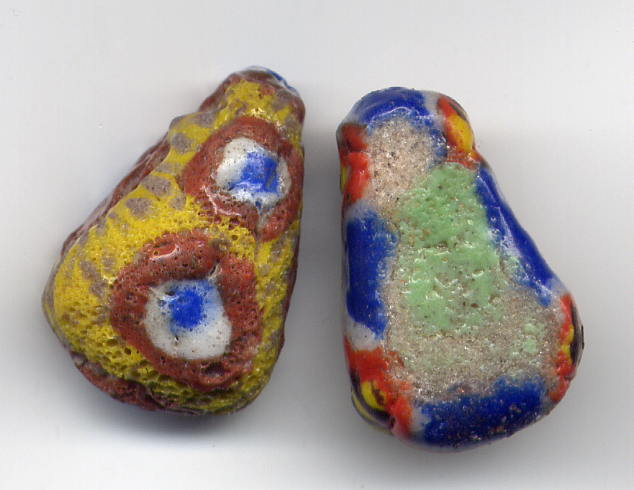
Kiffa beads, contemporary

With the passing of the last of the remaining traditional bead makers during the 1970s, Kiffa bead crafting became extinct. Since the early 1990s, organized groups of women bead makers are again making Kiffa beads, using basically the same traditional methods. The craftsmanship of the new beads, however, has never reached the high standards and the quality that can be observed in the old beads. Western artists have made their own versions in polymer clay or lampworked glass, but none of the modern creations come close to resembling the beauty of traditional specimens. The same applies to modern imitations made elsewhere, for instance in Indonesia.
